= Transport in Stockholm =

Modes of transportation in the Swedish capital

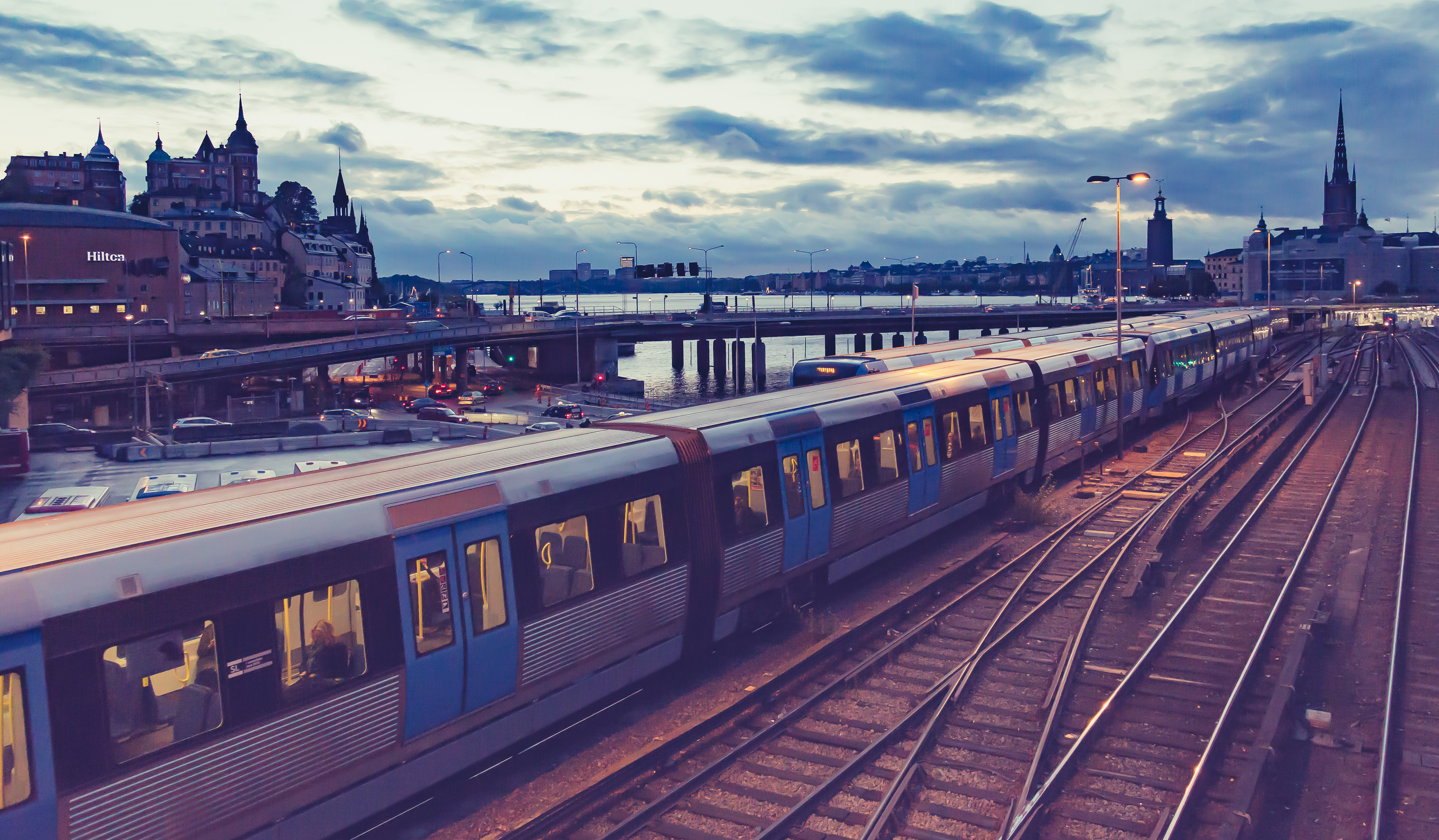
Metro trains at Slussen

Transport in Stockholm consists of an extensive and well-developed transport network, integrating both public and private services across the city and surrounding county. Stockholm regularly ranks as having one of the best public transport systems in the world.

Public transport is managed primarily by Storstockholms Lokaltrafik (SL), which is owned by Region Stockholm. SL oversees a wide range of services, including buses, the metro, commuter rail, light rail, local rail, and commuter ferries. SL's network uses a unified ticketing system, while operation and maintenance of SL's services are managed by various contracted companies.

In addition to SL, several other public and private operators provide regional and inter-city rail connections, long-distance buses, and Waxholmsbolaget archipelago boat services.

Airport transport services in Stockholm are provided by both public and private operators. SL offers commuter rail connections to Arlanda Airport and tram services to Bromma Airport, along with some local bus routes serving Arlanda. Private operators include Flygbussarna, which runs airport bus services, and the Arlanda Express, providing a high-speed train link to Arlanda Airport.

== Public transport ==
=== Buses ===
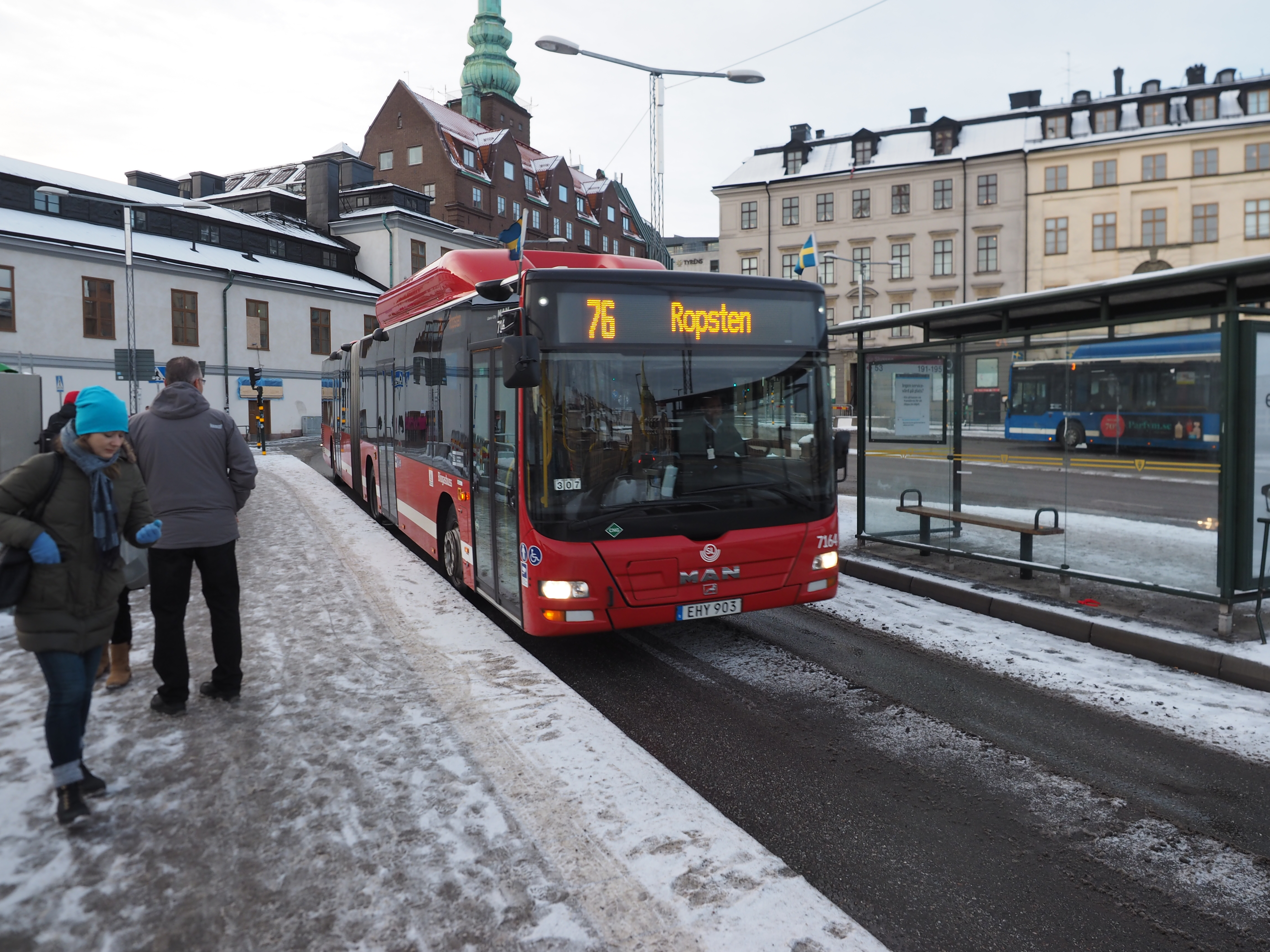
A red city bus to Ropsten in the centre of Stockholm.

There are over 500 bus lines in Stockholm County. There are three different kinds of bus lines that differ from regular bus lines.

- Inner-city blue bus lines
- Suburban blue bus lines
- Service bus lines

The blue buses are in the inner city variant trunk lines traversing large parts of the Stockholm inner city, and in the suburban variant acting as important feeder lines between the suburbs and public transport hubs in central Stockholm, or providing crossway connections between suburbs. These are called blue bus lines because the buses that operate on them are painted blue, in contrast to the red color of the regular buses. The service bus lines are especially adapted for elderly people, and are found in certain residential areas. Along some parts of these lines instead of regular bus stops there are areas where one can halt the bus just by waving at them. In addition to this, there are also night busses, which replace the regular bus routes during the night, during which they do not run. These lines always have some variation of X9X as their number, such as 197, 91, and 291.

Buses in Stockholm have a punctuality of around 92%.

==== Blue bus lines ====
Line	Route
1	Frihamnen – Hötorget – Fridhemsplan – Stora Essingen
2	Norrtull – Odenplan – Slussen – Sofia
3	Södersjukhuset – Slussen – Fridhemsplan – Karolinska Hospital
4	Gullmarsplan – Fridhemsplan – Östra station – Radiohuset
5	Liljeholmen – Hornstull – Fridhemsplan – Karolinska Hospital
6	Ropsten – Östra station – Odenplan – Karolinska Institute
172	Hallunda – Huddinge – Högdalen – Skarpnäck
173	Skärholmen – Älvsjö – Bandhagen – Skarpnäck
175	Akalla – Barkarbystaden – Barkarby station
176	Mörby station – Solna – Ekerö centre – Stenhamra
177	Mörby station – Solna – Tappström – Skärvik
178	Mörby station – Helenelund station – Kista – Jakobsberg station
179	Sollentuna station – Kista – Spånga station – Vällingby
471	Slussen – Nacka – Orminge centre – West Orminge
474	Slussen – Gustavsberg centre – Ålstäket – Hemmesta
670	Östra station – Danderyds sjukhus – Vaxholm
676	Östra station – Danderyds sjukhus – Norrtälje
677	Norrtälje - Rimbo - Knivsta - Uppsala
873	Gullmarsplan – Tyresö centre – Nyfors
875	Gullmarsplan – Tyresö centre – Tyresö church

=== Metro ===
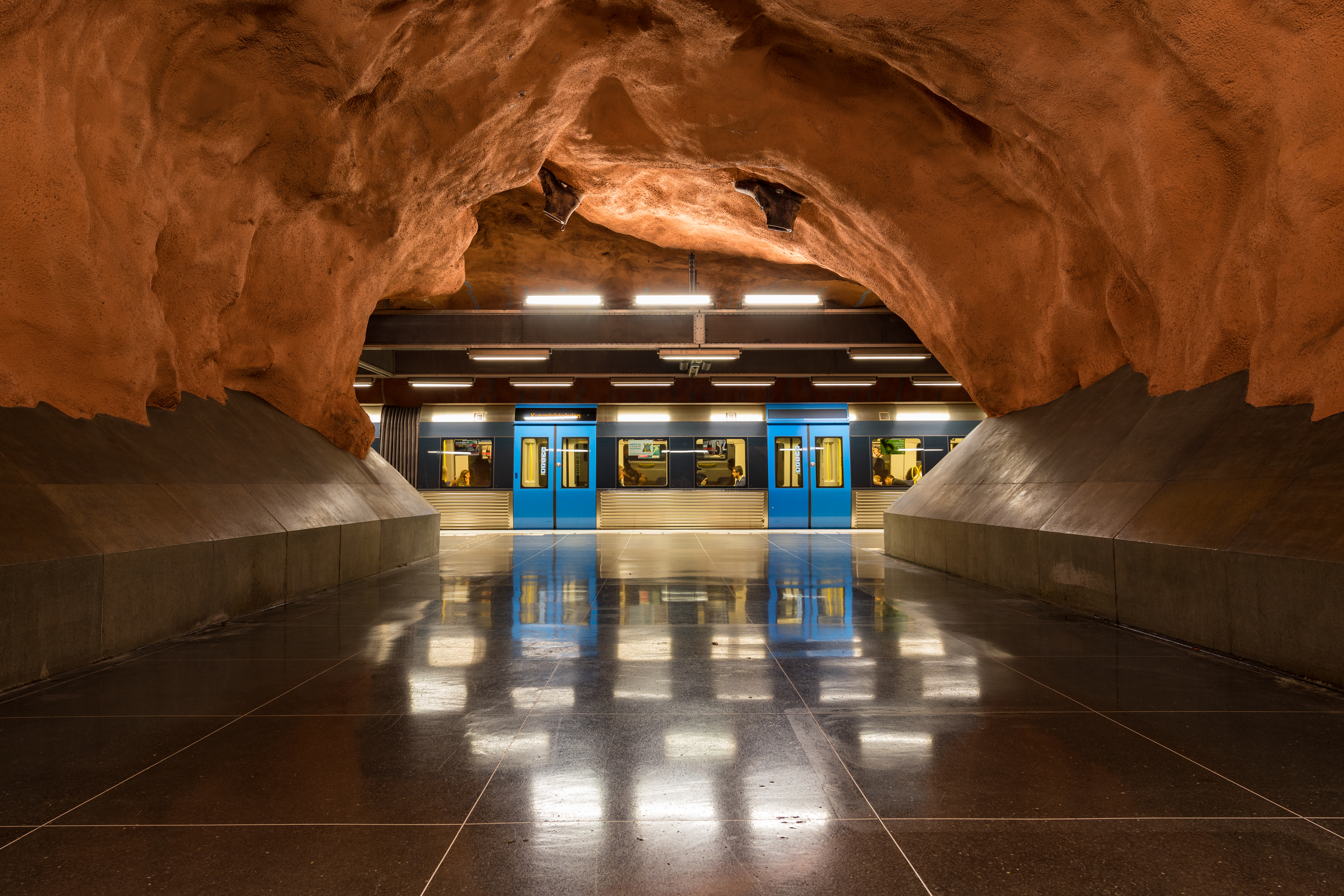
Rådhuset metro station on the Stockholm Metro

The Stockholm Metro consists of three groups of lines (blue, red, green), which are each referred to as a singular line.

Line	Route	Travel time	Length	Stations	Average speed	Average distance between stations
10	Kungsträdgården – Hjulsta	23 min	15.1 km	14	39.4 km/h (24.5 mph)	1,162 m (3,812 ft)
11	Kungsträdgården – Akalla	22 min	15.6 km	12	42.5 km/h (26.4 mph)	1,300 m (4,300 ft)
13	Norsborg – Ropsten	44 min	26.6 km	25	36.3 km/h (22.6 mph)	1,108 m (3,635 ft)
14	Fruängen – Mörby centrum	33 min	19.5 km	19	35.5 km/h (22.1 mph)	1,083 m (3,553 ft)
17	Skarpnäck – Åkeshov	43 min	19.6 km	24	27.3 km/h (17.0 mph)	852 m (2,795 ft)
18	Farsta strand – Alvik	37 min	18.4 km	23	29.8 km/h (18.5 mph)	836 m (2,743 ft)
19	Hagsätra – Hässelby strand	55 min	28.6 km	35	31.2 km/h (19.4 mph)	841 m (2,759 ft)
Entire metro network			108 km	100		

The Stockholm metro has been called 'the world's longest art gallery', with most of the network's 100 stations decorated with sculptures, mosaics, paintings, installations, engravings, and reliefs.

=== Commuter rail ===
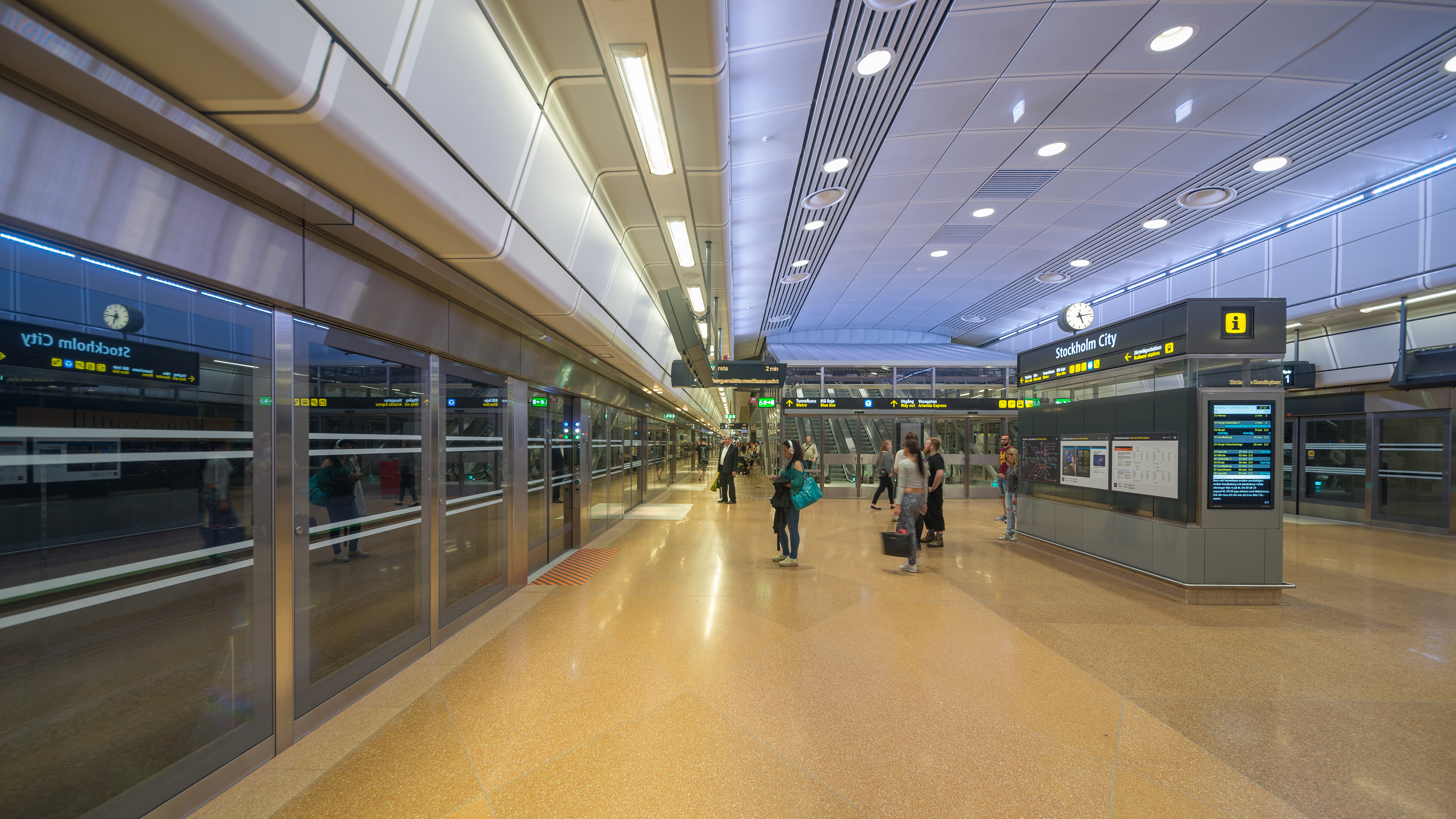
Stockholm City commuter train station

The Pendeltåg commuter train system connects central Stockholm with the wider county, operating on two main branches with four route lines:

Line	Route	Length	Stations
40	Uppsala C – Arlanda C– Stockholm City – Södertälje centrum		25
41	Märsta – Stockholm City – Södertälje centrum		24
43	Bålsta – Stockholm City – Nynäshamn		28
48	Södertälje centrum – Gnesta		6

=== Light rail ===
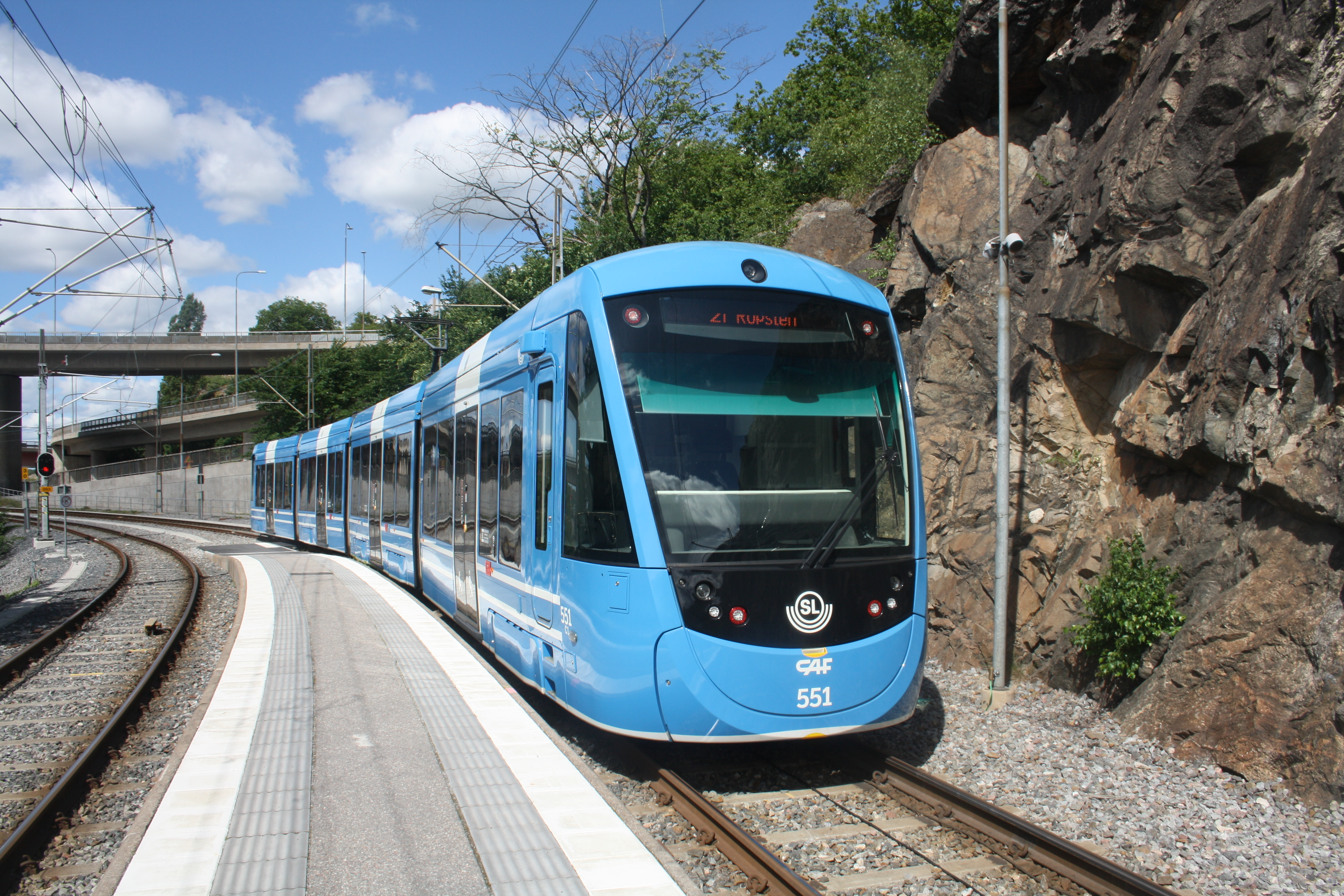
Lidingöbanan

There are four light rail systems in Stockholm.

- Lidingöbanan: A light rail line linking the island of Lidingö to the mainland.
- Tvärbanan: A semi-circular orbital route passing west of the city using various bridges, tunnels and on-road sections.
- Nockebybanan: A feeder light rail line linking western suburbs to the Stockholm metro.
- Spårväg City: A tram line connecting the city centre with Djurgården.

Two of them, Nockebybanan and Tvärbanan are connected and share depot and rolling stock. The vehicles used on these lines are localised versions of the Bombardier Flexity Swift and CAF Urbos.

There is one heritage tram line operational, Djurgården line. The infrastructure is part of Spårväg City owned by SL, but the cars are owned and operated by the Swedish Tramway Society. All SL fares are valid.

Name	Line	Route	Length	Stops
Spårväg City	7	Sergels Torg – Waldemarsudde	3.2 km	12
Djurgårdslinjen	7N	Norrmalmstorg – Waldemarsudde/Bellmansro	2.9 km	10
Nockebybanan	12	Nockeby – Alvik	5.7 km	10
Lidingöbanan	21	Ropsten – Gåshaga brygga	9.2 km	14
Tvärbanan	30	Sickla – Solna railway station	18.2 km	26
Tvärbanan	31	Alviks Strand – Bromma Flygplats		6

== Rail ==
=== Local ===
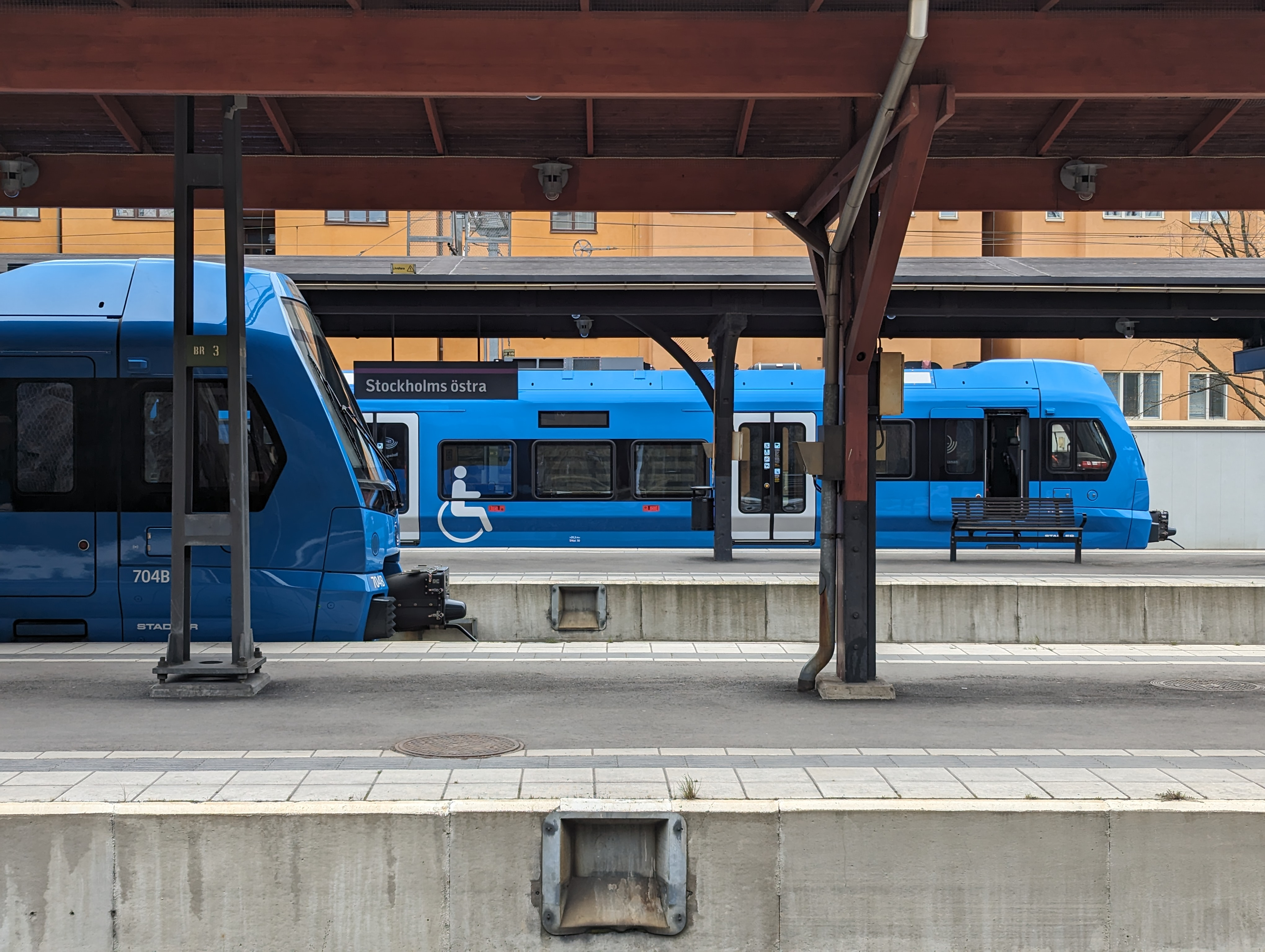
Roslagsbanan

There are two further local systems (also labelled in English material as "light rail" by SL) the Roslagsbanan, a narrow gauge rail system, and the Saltsjöbanan with standard gauge rail. Neither are connected to the main railway network.

Between 2022 and 2024, the entire Saltsjöbanan was replaced by buses due to construction work on the line. It opened again in 2024, with a new temporary terminus at Saltsjö-Järla station, however, due to significant wheel damage appearing on the rolling stock in the spring of 2025, a decision was taken by SL to indefinitely pause traffic. After significant vehicle repairs, traffic was resumed in November of the same year, with complementary replacement buses staying until Slussen station re-opens, which is slated for 2028.

Roslagsbanan is planned to be extended to T-Centralen via Odenplan in a new tunnel that will start construction in 2030.

Name	Lines	Route	Length	Stations
Saltsjöbanan	25, 26	Slussen – Saltsjöbaden; Igelboda – Solsidan	18.5 km	18
Roslagsbanan	27, 28, 29	Stockholms östra railway station – Näsbypark/Österskär/Kårsta	65.0 km	39

=== Regional and intercity ===
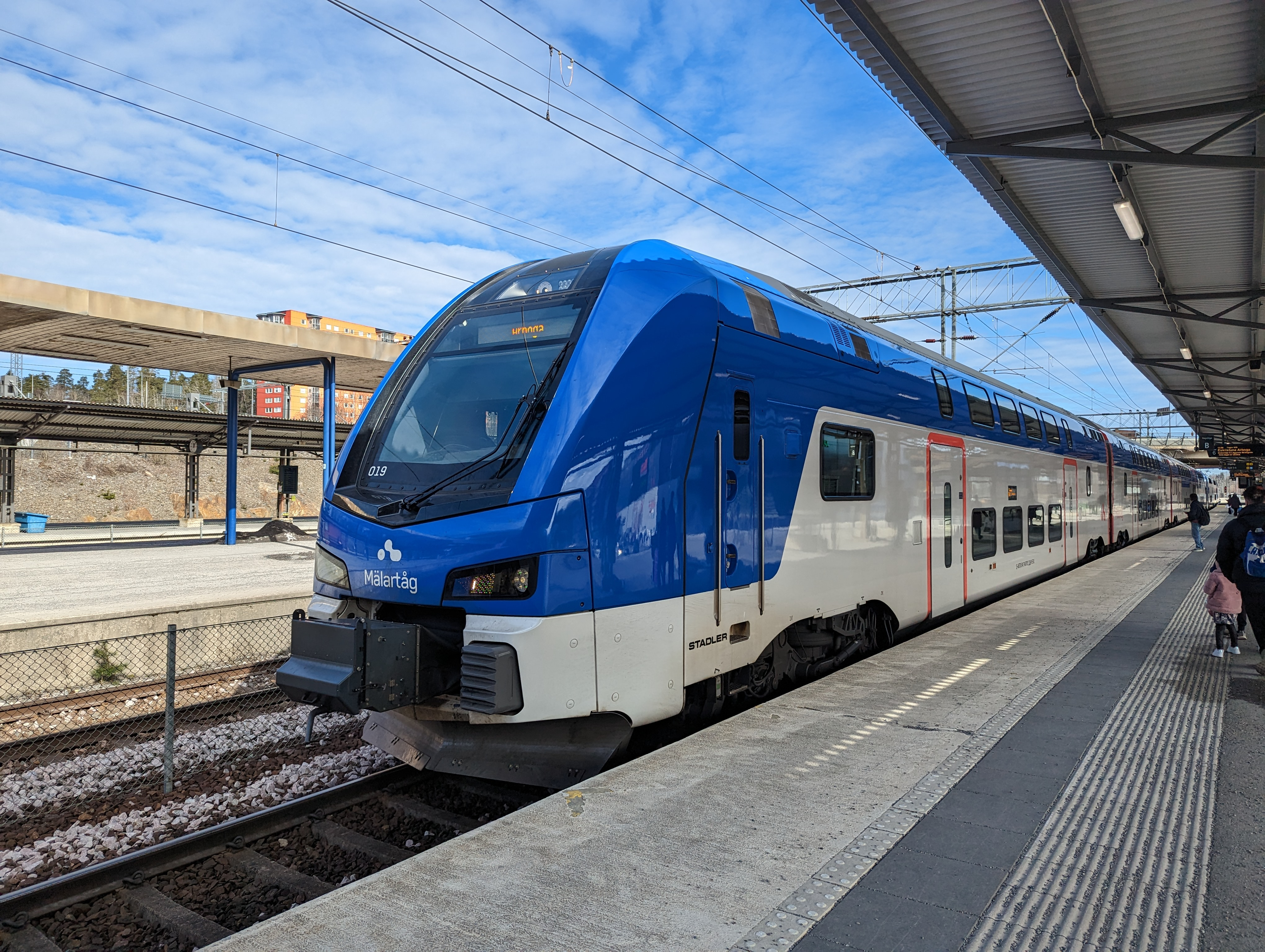
Mälartåg regional train

There are also regional and InterCity trains going on the mainlines between Stockholm and cities outside the county. These cities include Uppsala, Gävle, Eskilstuna, Linköping, Västerås. These train are run by Mälartåg and SJ with some being subject to public funding. Single tickets can be bought from each respective operator while period tickets including local public transport can be used on either operator.

== Water ==
=== Archipelago boats ===
The majority of transport across the islands of archipelago is operated by Waxholmsbolaget. Boats depart from Strömkajen, Vaxholm, Stavsnäs, Årsta brygga, and Nynäshamn.

=== Commuter ferries ===
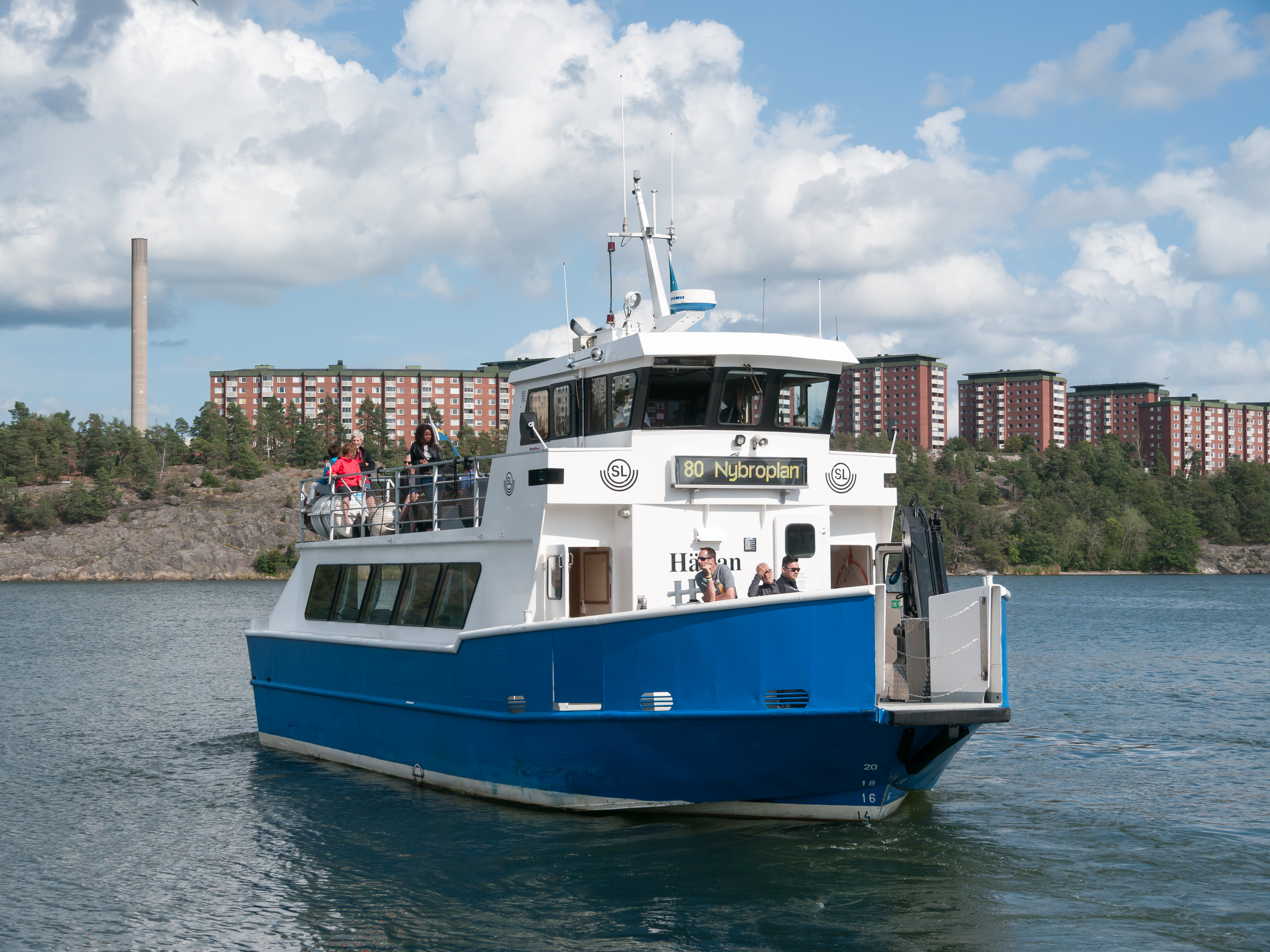
Ferryboat Hättan on Route 80 (Sjövägen)

As of November 2021, there are four commuter ferry (pendelbåt) lines in Stockholm, administered by SL. Some are run by Waxholmsbolaget under SL supervision.

Line	Route
80	Nybroplan – Ropsten - Frösvik
82	Slussen – Allmänna gränd
83	Strömkajen – Vaxholm - Rindö Grenadjärbryggan
83X	Strömkajen – Vaxholm - Rindö Grenadjärbryggan
89	Klara Mällarstrand – Tappström (Ekerö)
84	Strömkajen – Ålstäket (Gustavsberg)

== Roads ==
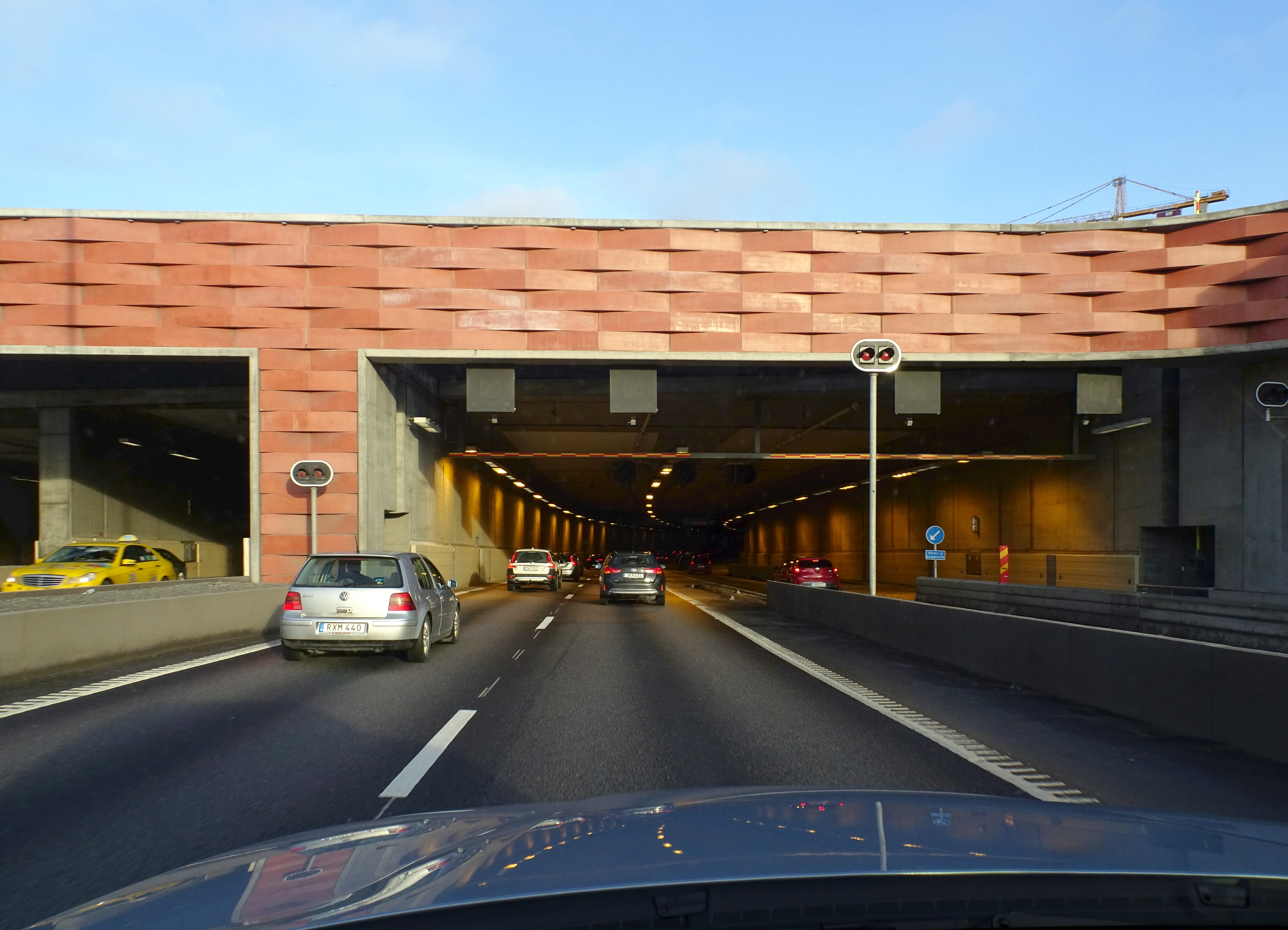
Norra länken (North link) motorway in Stockholm

Stockholm’s road network is shaped by its geographic location, spread across islands between Lake Mälaren and the Baltic Sea. Historically, waterways posed significant obstacles for land transport, with only a few key routes existing in the Middle Ages. Over the centuries, Stockholm's roads evolved, starting with Göta landsväg, the only southern route until the 1670s, and expanding through major developments such as Klas Fleming’s 17th-century street regulations and Albert Lindhagen’s urban planning in the late 19th century. Today, Stockholm’s main traffic arteries include Essingeleden, Södertäljevägen, and other radial routes connecting the city out to surrounding areas.

Stockholm is at the junction of the European routes E4, E18 and E20. A C-shaped motorway ring road exists around the south, west and north of the City Centre. The northern section of the ring road, Norra Länken, opened for traffic in 2015. A final eastern section has been discussed at various points in the past and was initially discontinued in 2018, but in October of 2025 the city of Stockholm, the Stockholm regional authority, surrounding municipalities and the Swedish government signed an agreement to work towards completing the ring road with an eastern section. While the political majority in the city initially opposed the project, a compromise was reached where the government in return granted continued funding for the expansion of the Stockholm metro and Spårväg Syd, a light rail project in the southern Stockholm suburbs, half of which was halted indefinitely in May of 2025 due to lack of funding by the Swedish state.

A bypass motorway for traffic between Northern and Southern Sweden, Förbifart Stockholm, is being built west of the city. The many islands and waterways make extensions of the road system both complicated and expensive, and new motorways are often built as systems of tunnels and bridges.

=== Congestion charge ===
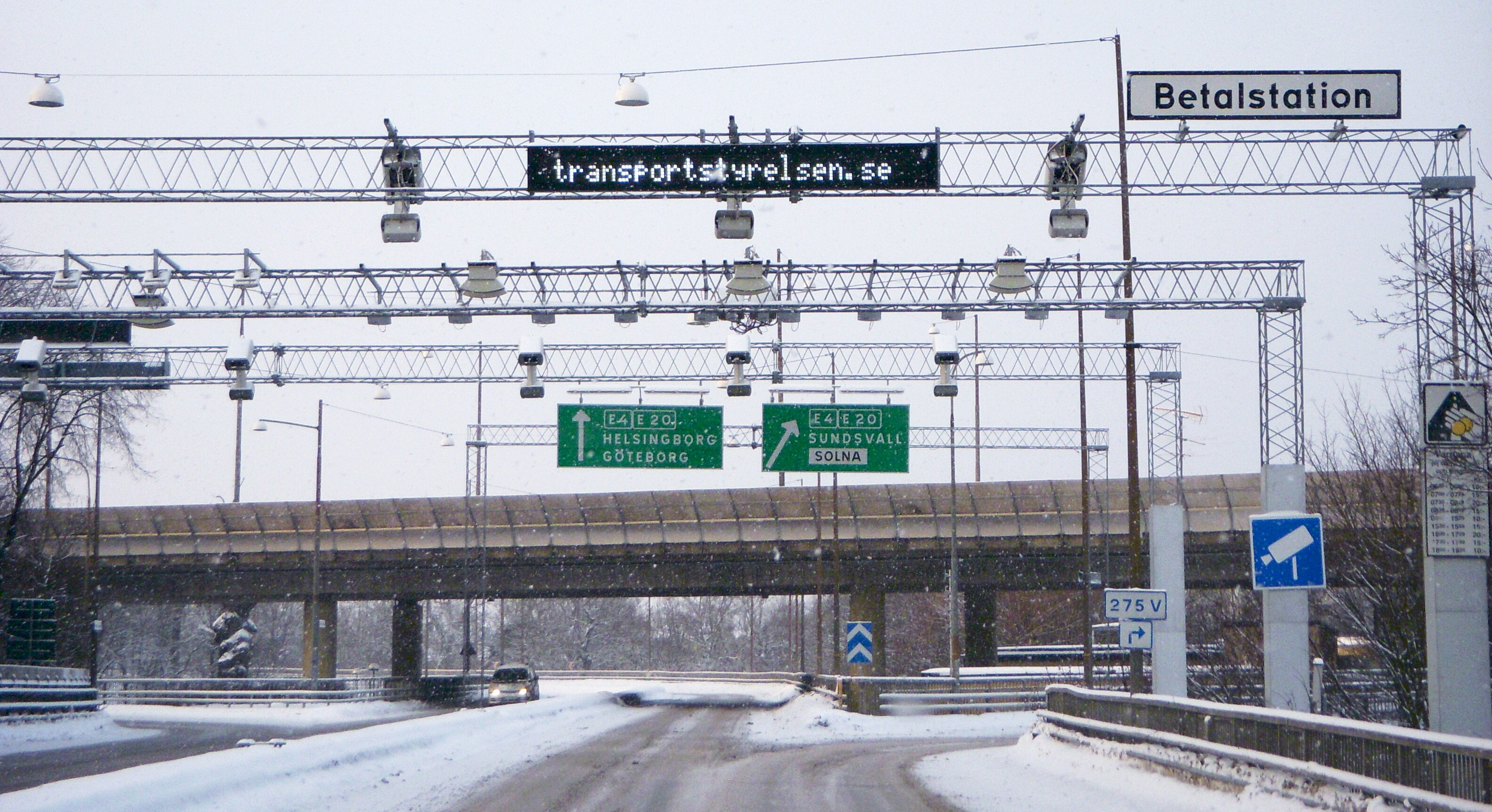
A control point for the congestion charge leading up to Essingeleden

Stockholm has a congestion pricing system, the Stockholm congestion tax, in use on a permanent basis since 1 August 2007, after having had a seven-month trial period in the first half of 2006. The City Centre is within the congestion tax zone. All the entrances and exits of this area have unmanned control points operating with automatic number plate recognition. All vehicles entering or exiting the congestion tax-affected area, with a few exceptions, have to pay 10–20 SEK (1.09–2.18 EUR, 1.49–2.98 USD) depending on the time of day between 06:30 and 18:29. The maximum tax amount per vehicle per day is SEK 60 (EUR 6.53). Payment is done by various means within 14 days after one has passed one of the control points; one cannot pay at the control points.

After the trial period was over, consultative referendums were held in Stockholm Municipality and several other municipalities in Stockholm County. The then-reigning government (Persson Cabinet) stated that they would only take into consideration the results of the referendum in Stockholm Municipality. The opposition parties (Alliance for Sweden) stated that if they were to form a cabinet after the general election—which was held the same day as the congestion tax referendums—they would take into consideration the referendums held in several of the other municipalities in Stockholm County as well. The results of the referendums were that the Stockholm Municipality voted for the congestion tax, while the other municipalities voted against it. The opposition parties won the general election and a few days before they formed government (Reinfeldt Cabinet) they announced that the congestion tax would be reintroduced in Stockholm, but that the revenue would go entirely to road construction in and around Stockholm. During the trial period and according to the agenda of the previous government, the revenue went entirely to public transport.

== Airport transport ==
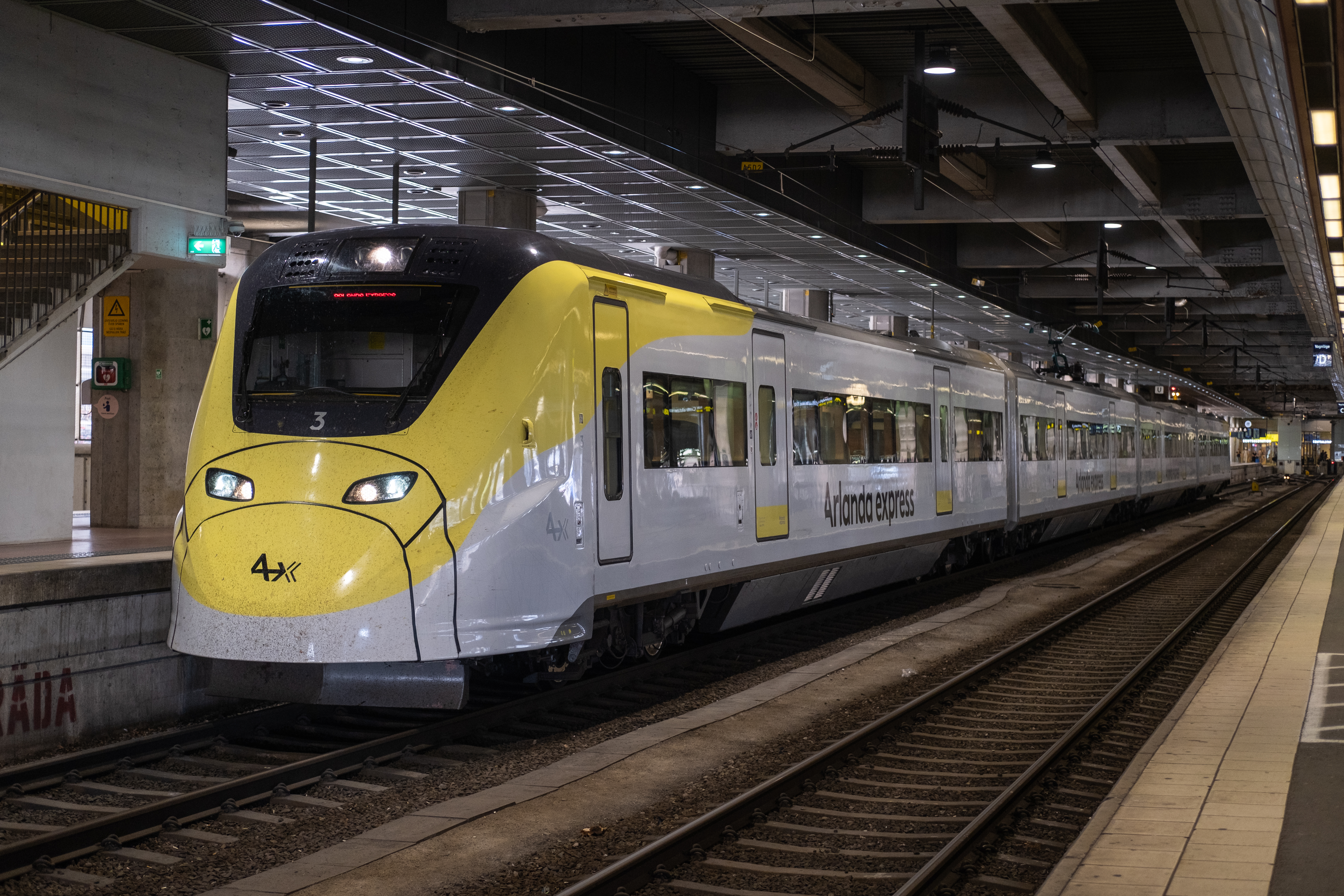
Arlanda Express

=== Arlanda Airport ===
Being the largest airport in Sweden, it is connected to Stockholm by several means. Arlanda Express provides an airport rail link service between the airport and Stockholm Central Station. It is by far the fastest connection, but also the most expensive. Other possibility is to take the pendeltåg commuter train as one of its lines passes through the airport, but a special surcharge is applied. This is because Arlanda Express has been built as a public–private partnership project, with the winner having a monopoly on rail transport to the airport. Other rail operators like SL are therefore obliged to pay fees to Arlanda Express. Flygbussarna provides shuttle bus connection from the airport to cityterminalen.

=== Bromma Airport ===
Bromma Airport is connected via tram line 31 (Tvärbanan). Flygbussarna provides an airport bus service to and from all four airports associated with Stockholm: Stockholm-Arlanda Airport, Stockholm-Bromma Airport, Stockholm-Skavsta Airport, and Stockholm-Västerås Airport.

== See also ==
- Planka.nu
- Transport in Sweden
