= Lidingö Municipality =

Lidingö Municipality Lidingö kommun
- Municipality
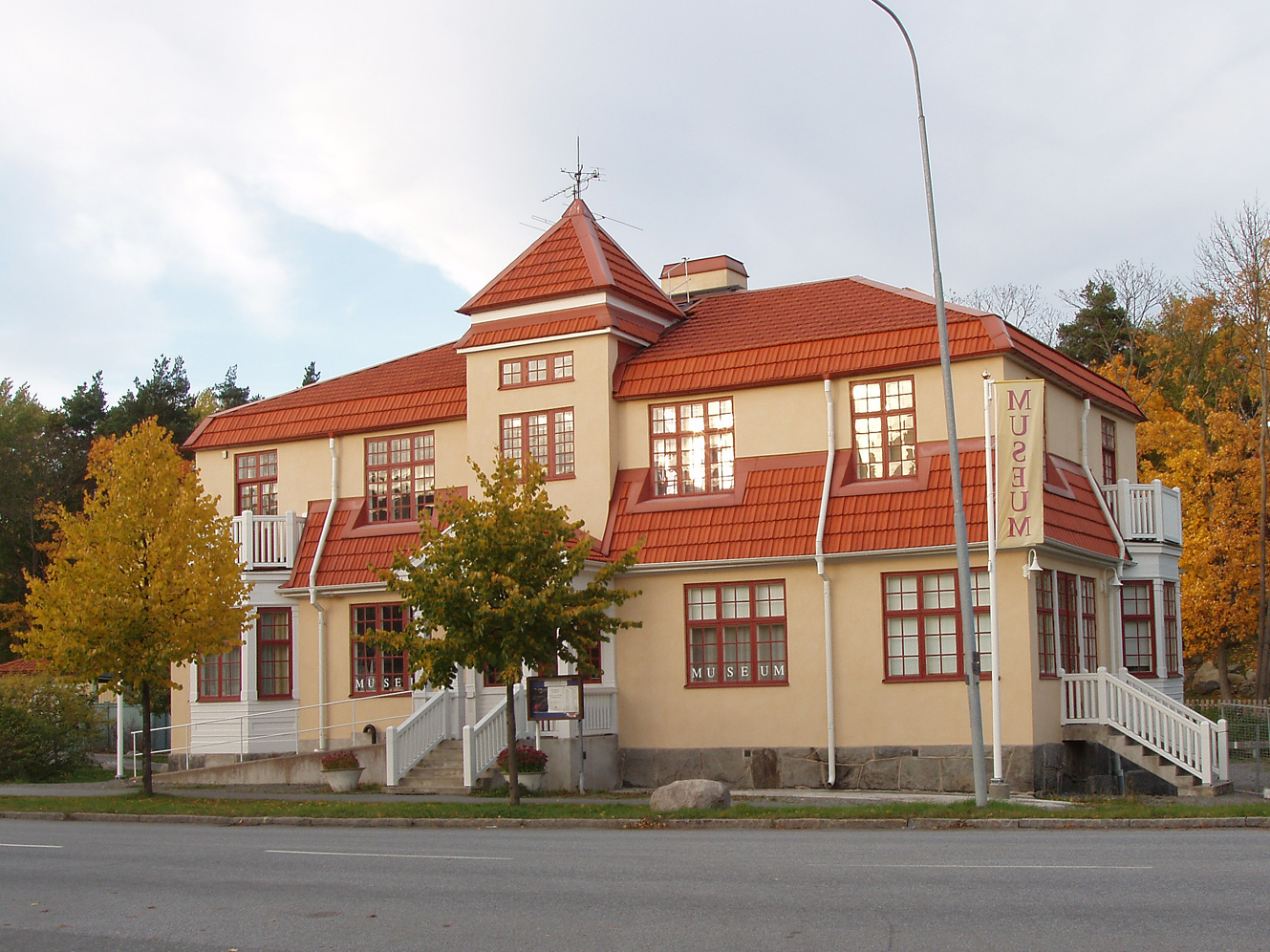
- Lidingö Museum

- Flag Coat of arms

- Coordinates: 59°22′N 18°09′E
- Country: Sweden
- County: Stockholm County
- Seat: Lidingö

Area
  - Total: 51.05 km^{2} (19.71 sq mi)
  - Land: 30.8 km^{2} (11.9 sq mi)
  - Water: 20.25 km^{2} (7.82 sq mi)
- Area as of 1 January 2014.

Population (30 June 2025)
  - Total: 48,455
  - Density: 1,570/km^{2} (4,070/sq mi)
- Time zone: UTC+1 (CET)
  - Summer (DST): UTC+2 (CEST)
- ISO 3166 code: SE
- Province: Uppland
- Municipal code: 0186
- Website: www.lidingo.se
- Density is calculated using land area only.

Lidingö Municipality (Swedish: Lidingö kommun, semi-officially Lidingö stad) is a municipality east of Stockholm in Stockholm County in east central Sweden. Its seat is located on the island of Lidingö. The municipality is a part of Metropolitan Stockholm.

It is chiefly located on the island Lidingö, but also incorporates a few smaller islands in the surroundings, most notably the Fjäderholmarna islands within the Stockholm archipelago.

Being an island municipality it has not been amalgamated with any other entities. The small island of Tranholmen has, however, been transferred to Danderyd Municipality. The rural municipality was made a market town (köping) in 1910, a city in 1926 and a unitary municipality in 1971.

The municipality always refers to itself as Lidingö stad ("the City of Lidingö"). This was a decision taken by the municipal assembly (kommunfullmäktige) in 1992.

Raoul Wallenberg, Righteous Among the Nations, was born in Lidingö on 4 August 1912.

== Geography ==
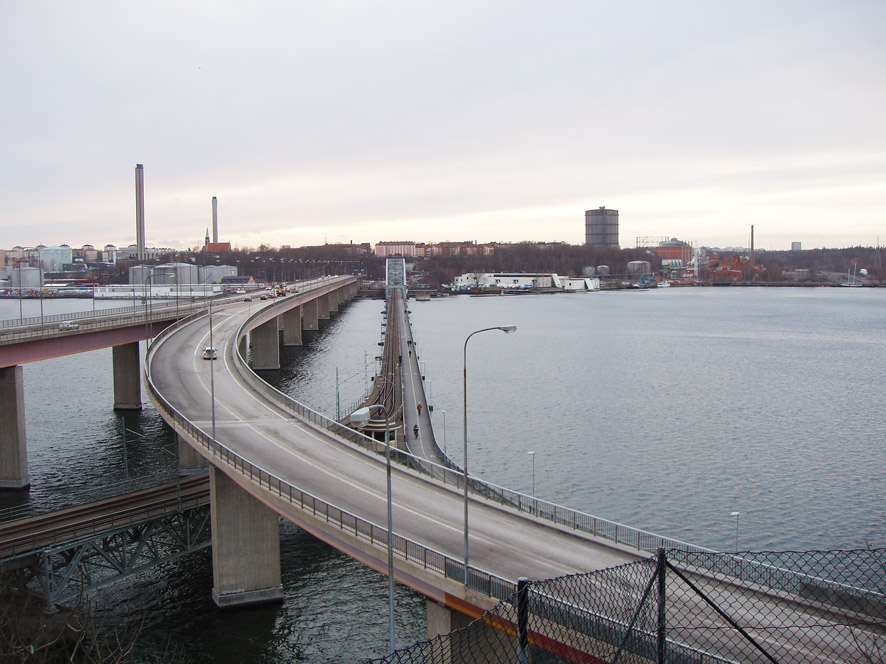
The two bridges connecting Lidingö with Stockholm. Old bridge to the right. View towards Ropsten.

The island Lidingö is connected to the city of Stockholm by the two bridges of Lidingöbron. One is for cars and one for the Lidingöbanan suburban tramway and pedestrians. The bridges lead directly to Ropsten, a station on the Stockholm Metro.

Lidingö is for statistical purposes divided into three localities: Lidingö, Brevik and Sticklinge udde. Because of the strait Lilla Värtan separating the island Lidingö from central Stockholm, Lidingö statistically is not counted as a part of Stockholm.

== History ==
Lidingö traces its history to at least 600 BC, from when remains have been found. According to legend, Lidingö was a place where the Vikings would gather before setting sails to eastern areas, however no proof have been found to confirm that theory. When the city arms was to be chosen in 1928 a Viking ship became the motif, in the colors of the Swedish flag. Lidingö was first mentioned in writing in 1328, called Lydhingö when the entire island and the farms were owned by Bo Johnsson Grip. On a map from 1661 the island is called Lijdingeöö.

== Economy ==
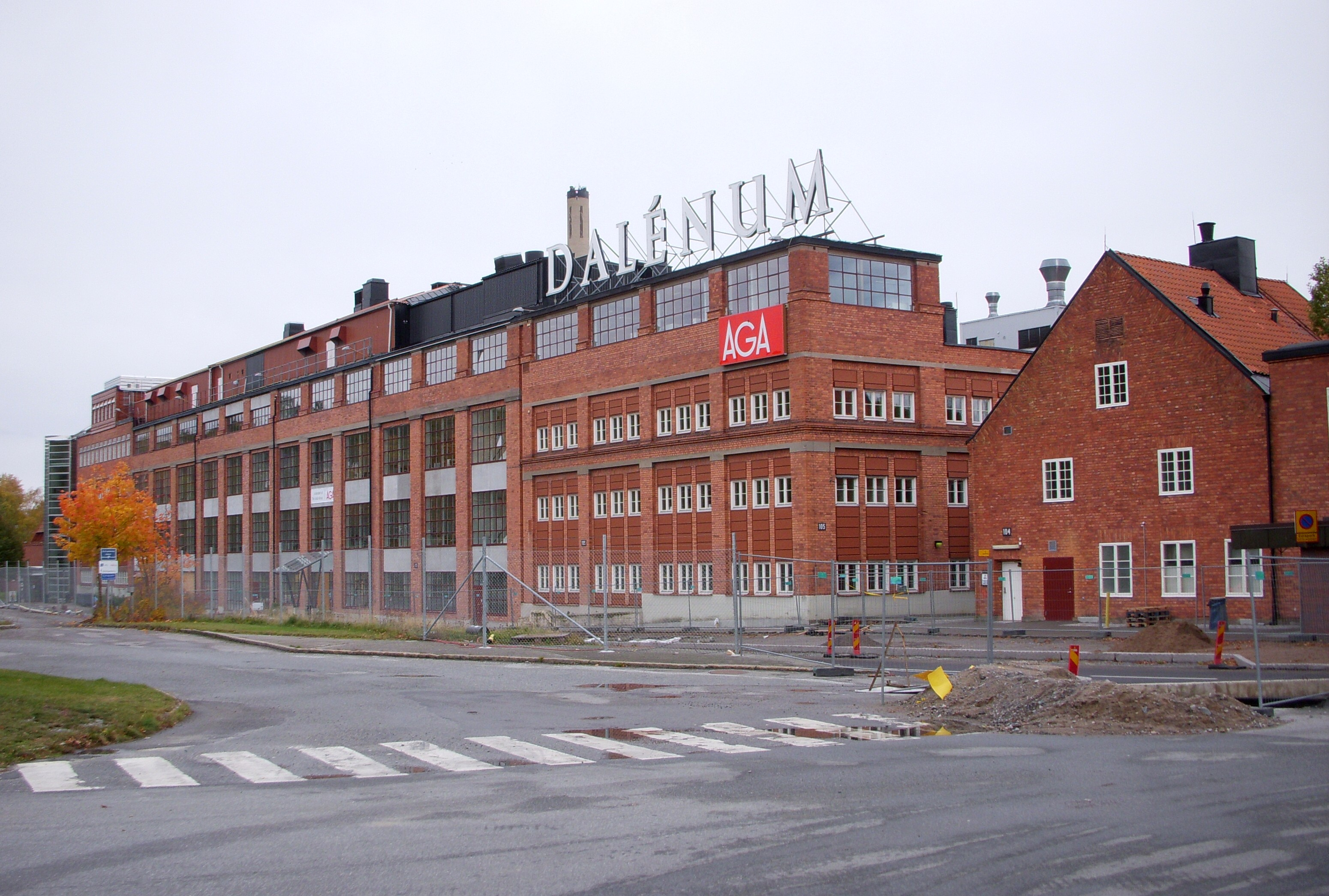
Dalénum where AGA have the head office since 1912.

The island itself hosts very few industries, a relatively well-known one being AGA AB, which started production on the island in 1912.

Much of the populated land area is built with one-family houses; a total of 36% of the population, or 17,020 people (2006), live in such houses and, to a large extent, commute to work in Stockholm or other municipalities of Greater Stockholm.

There are also quite a number of conference mansions in the northern parts of the island, providing a part of the industry of Lidingö.

== Demography ==
=== Population development ===
Population development in Lidingö Municipality 1970–2019
Year	Population
1970	36,174
1975	36,727
1980	37,390
1985	38,271
1990	38,399
1995	39,042
2000	40,584
2005	41,892
2010	44,017
2015	46,302
2017	47,185
2019	48,123

=== 2022 population by district ===
This is a demographic table based on Lidingö Municipality's electoral districts in the 2022 Swedish general election sourced from SVT's election platform, in turn taken from SCB official statistics.

In total there were 35,877 Swedish citizens of voting age resident in the municipality. 36.8% voted for the left coalition and 62.2% for the right coalition. Indicators are in percentage points except population totals and income.

Location	Residents	Citizen adults	Left vote	Right vote	Employed	Swedish parents	Foreign heritage	Income SEK	Degree
Location			%	%					
Baggeby	1,580	1,275	46.5	52.4	81	74	26	27,068	57
Bo-Björnbo	1,780	1,359	27.8	71.8	80	89	11	37,349	81
Bodal	1,559	1,218	42.7	55.3	82	75	25	28,374	57
Brevik Ö-Käppala S	1,972	1,403	25.8	73.7	78	84	16	44,103	79
Dalénum	2,184	1,699	32.7	66.1	82	76	24	39,360	69
Ekholmsnäs-Killinge	1,666	1,162	34.0	64.8	83	78	22	33,781	64
Gångsätra V	1,648	1,160	56.1	41.9	73	46	54	23,564	49
Gångsätra Ö	2,235	1,580	39.4	59.2	84	81	19	37,524	70
Gåshaga	1,834	1,362	22.8	77.0	83	84	16	47,709	72
Hersby S	2,032	1,442	29.1	70.0	84	86	14	41,117	75
Hersby SÖ-Mosstorp	2,272	1,602	42.8	56.7	83	83	17	36,819	71
Herserud	2,002	1,591	28.8	70.2	77	84	16	34,303	73
Käppala N	1,573	1,192	46.9	50.8	75	46	54	24,433	45
Larsberg N	2,123	1,669	52.7	46.0	77	59	41	25,689	49
Larsberg S	1,803	1,327	48.8	49.4	76	60	40	26,219	47
Mölna Ö-Brevik V	2,157	1,508	32.0	67.5	81	83	17	40,586	71
Näset V	1,520	1,185	49.2	49.9	82	77	23	28,066	60
Näset Ö	1,904	1,474	42.3	56.6	83	81	19	33,782	65
Rudboda V-Bosön	1,779	1,341	41.8	57.1	80	86	14	35,164	71
Rudboda Ö-Yttringe	1,655	1,154	34.3	65.2	87	89	11	41,818	73
Skärsätra	1,759	1,366	41.3	57.3	81	78	22	31,383	66
Sticklinge N	2,120	1,455	24.4	74.8	81	84	16	48,062	79
Sticklinge S-Islinge	2,197	1,574	30.8	68.2	80	83	17	40,805	74
Stockby-Mölna V	1,288	1,018	34.4	65.0	82	84	16	45,033	76
Torsvik N-Hersby N	1,805	1,341	27.9	71.5	79	84	16	40,055	77
Torsvik S-Centrum	1,640	1,420	38.7	59.8	78	78	22	29,966	64
Source: SVT

=== Income and Education ===
Lidingö is one of the wealthiest municipalities in Sweden, with the fourth highest median income per capita. The share of highly educated persons, according to Statistics Sweden's definition: persons with post-secondary education that is three years or longer, is 46.0% – also the fourth highest in the country.

=== Residents with a foreign background ===
On 31 December 2017 the number of people with a foreign background (persons born outside of Sweden or with two parents born outside of Sweden) was 10 065, or 21.33% of the population (47 185 on 31 December 2017). On 31 December 2002 the number of residents with a foreign background was (per the same definition) 6 422, or 15.59% of the population (41 192 on 31 December 2002). On 31 December 2017 there were 47 185 residents in Lidingö, of which 8 265 people (17.52%) were born in a country other than Sweden. Divided by country in the table below - the Nordic countries as well as the 12 most common countries of birth outside of Sweden for Swedish residents have been included, with other countries of birth bundled together by continent by Statistics Sweden.

Country of birth
31 December 2017
1	Sweden	38,920
2	European Union: Other countries	1,563
3	Asia: Other countries	988
4	Finland	850
5	South America	608
6	Poland	487
7	Europe outside of the EU: other countries	479
8	Africa: Other countries	411
9	Germany	402
10	North America	382
11	Syria	302
12	Iraq	288
13	Iran	259
14	Norway	236
15	Afghanistan	189
16	Eritrea	158
17	Denmark	124
18	Thailand	110
19	Yugoslavia/Yugoslavia; SFR Yugoslavia/Serbia and Montenegro	105
20	Bosnia and Herzegovina	92
21	Turkey	71
22	Soviet Union	66
23	Oceania	53
24	Somalia	23
25	Iceland	16
26	Unknown country of birth	3

== Politics ==
The island's politics has traditionally been dominated by the centre-right Moderate Party. They currently run the municipality in coalition with the Christian Democrats and with the Lidingö Party.

Chairman of the municipal executive board is Anna Rheyneuclaudes Kihlman from the Moderate Party.

=== Election results ===
Election results 2014
Moderate Party	32,87%
Liberal People's Party	9,35%
Social Democrats	9,91%
Lidingö Party	14,32%
Centre Party	17,04%
Christian Democrats	3,88%
Green Party	7,06%
Left Party	2,36%

== Major sporting events ==
- Lidingöloppet, cross-country running, 30 km.
- Round Lidingö Race, sailing race round Lidingö counter clockwise, 13,5 M

== Culture ==
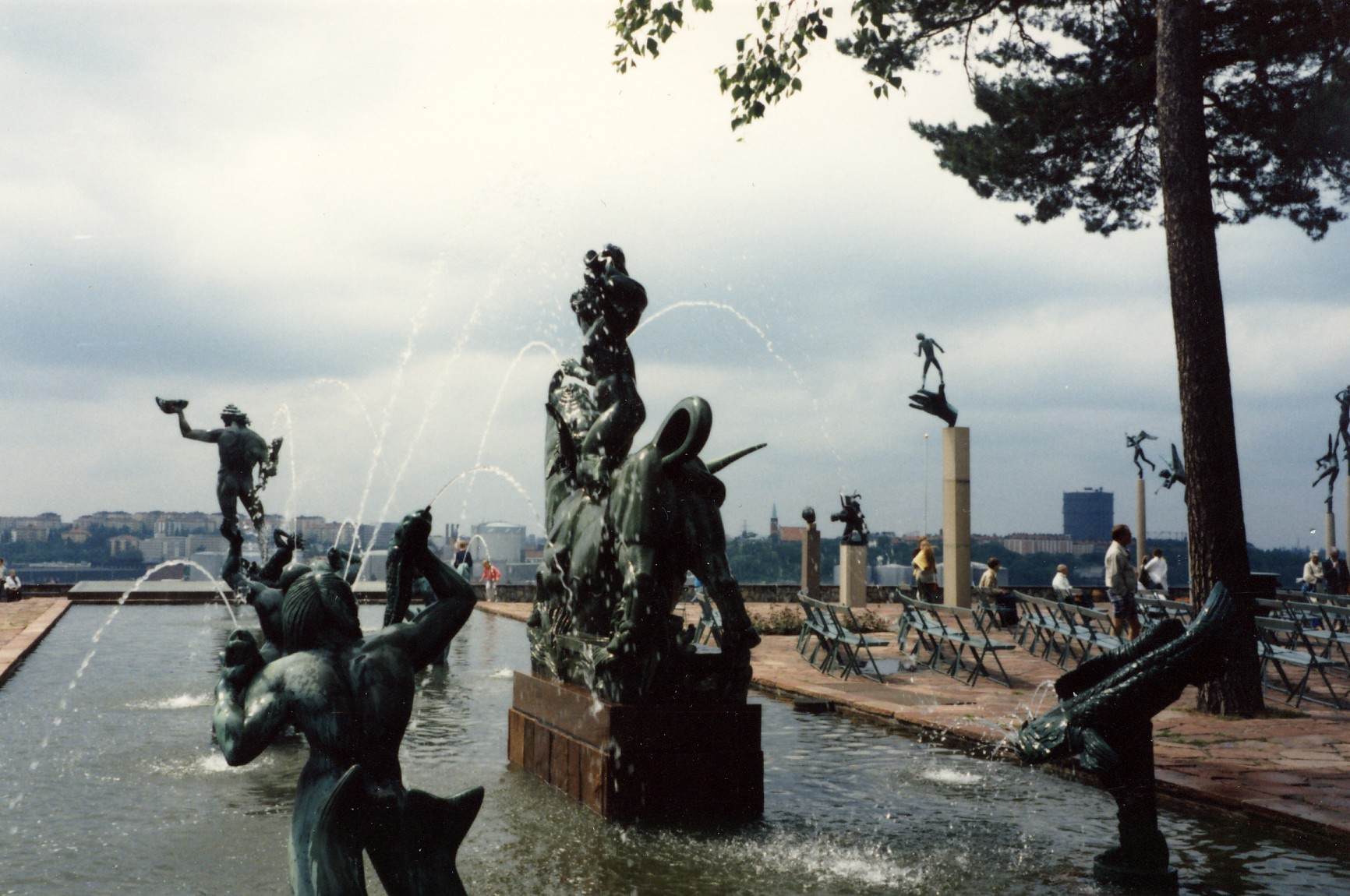
Millesgården art museum

Millesgården is an art museum and sculpture garden, located on the island of Lidingö, created by Carl and his wife Olga Milles.

== Twin towns – sister cities ==
Lidingö Municipality is twinned with:

- Lohja, Finland
- Saldus, Latvia
- Slavuta, Ukraine

== See also ==
- List of islands of Sweden
