= Ropsten metro station =

Stockholm Metro station

Ropsten
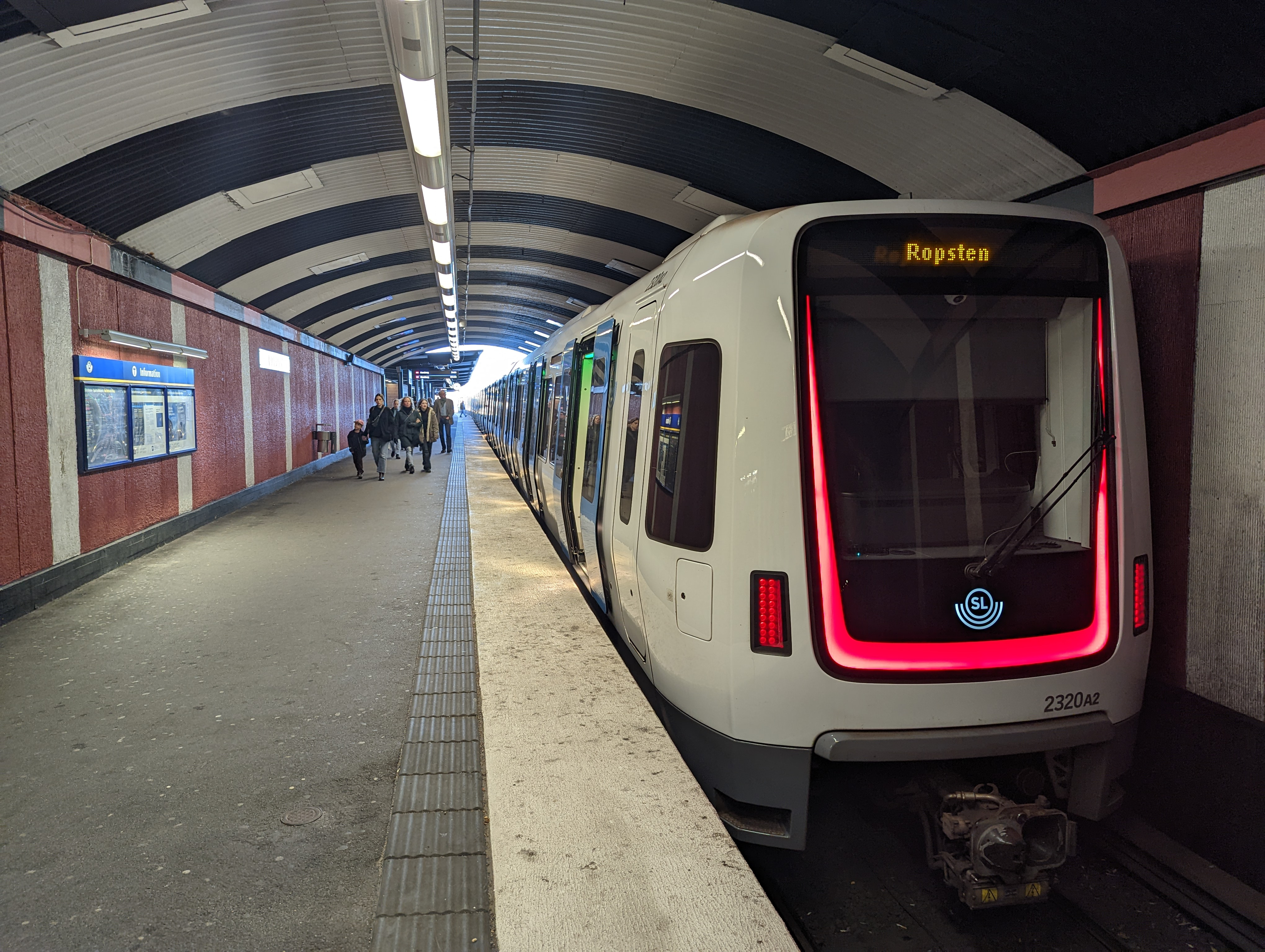

General information
- Coordinates: 59°21′26″N 18°6′6″E
- Elevation: 12.5 m (41 ft) above sea level
- System: Stockholm Metro station
- Owner: Storstockholms Lokaltrafik
- Platforms: 1 island platform
- Tracks: 2

Construction
- Structure type: Elevated
- Accessible: Yes

Other information
- Station code: ROS

History
- Opened: 2 September 1967; 59 years ago

Passengers
- 2019: 20,200 boarding per weekday (metro)
- 2019: 6,000 boarding per weekday (Lidingöbanan)

Services
Preceding station	Stockholm Metro	Following station
Gärdet towards Norsborg	Line 13	Terminus

Other services
Preceding station	SL Local & Light Rail	Following station
Terminus	Lidingöbanan Line 21	Torsvik towards Gåshaga brygga
Location
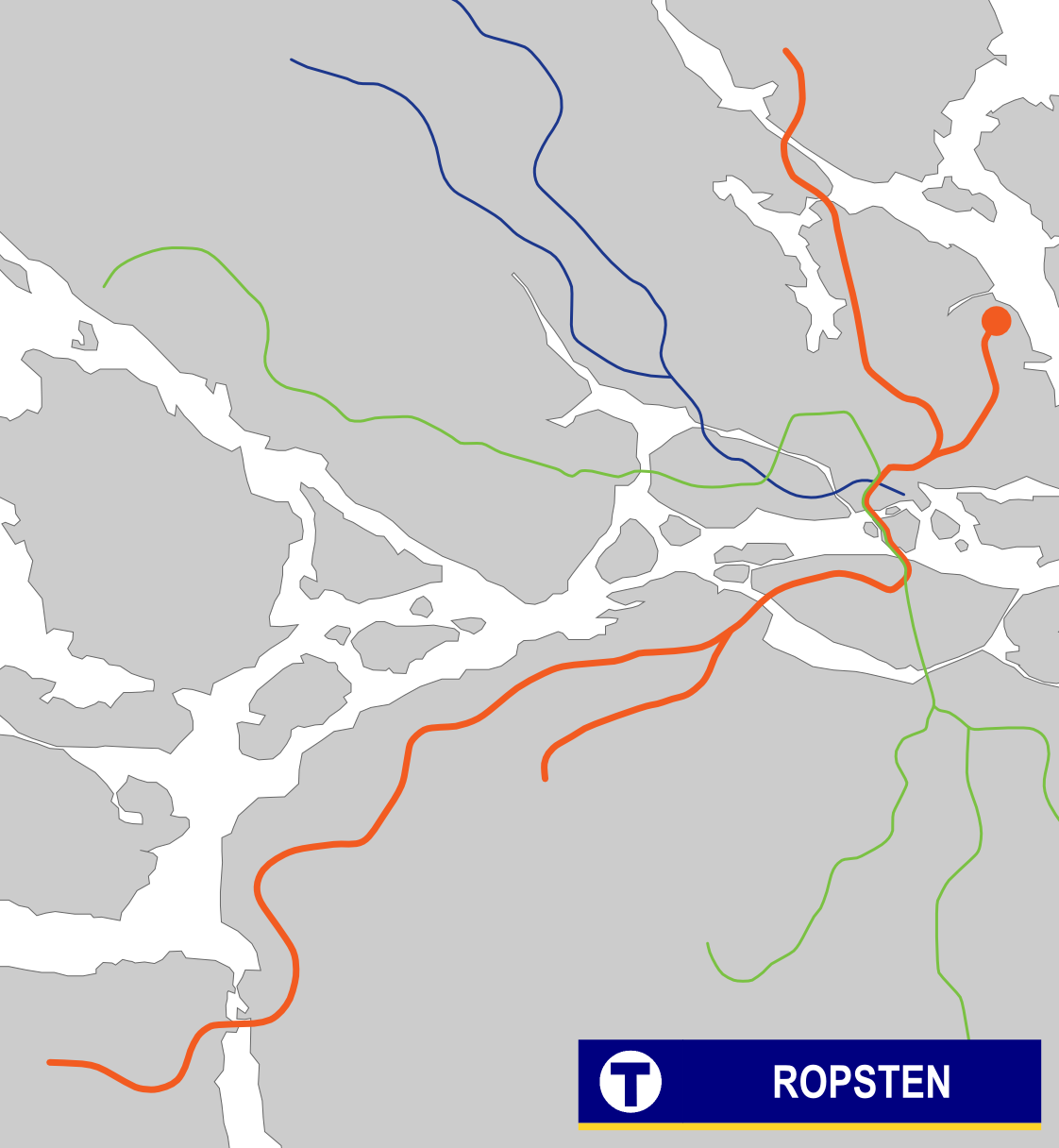

Ropsten is the end station on Line 13 of the Red Line of the Stockholm Metro, located in the district of Ropsten. The station was opened on 2 September 1967 as the northeastern terminus of the extension from Östermalmstorg.

The station was built about 10–15 metres above street level, done so as a preparation for an extension to Lidingö on a new bridge. However, there are now no plans for such an extension and the lines end in mid-air. In the 2010s when the old Lidingö bridge used by trams was considered needing a replacement, such a metro bridge was considered, but instead a new tram bridge was built.

The Ropsten station also includes the end stop on the Lidingöbanan tramway, a few metres above the street.

On street level there are many bus stops for buses towards Lidingö.
