= Solsidan =

Solsidan may refer to:

- Solsidan, Ekerö Municipality, a locality in Ekerö Municipality, Stockholm County, Sweden
- Solsidan (TV series), a Swedish television comedy series
- Solsidan (film), a 2017 Swedish comedy-drama film, based on the TV series
