= Sticklinge =

Coordinates: 59°22′59.2″N 18°6′38.84″E

Sticklinge is a small community outside Stockholm, Sweden on the island of Lidingö. The population is about 5,000 people. The locality Sticklinge udde is located in northern Sticklinge.

Södra (South) Sticklinge spans over an area about 250000 square meters.
