= Sticklinge udde =

- Location within Stockholm Location within Sweden Location within European Union
- Coordinates: 59°23′N 18°07′E
- Country: Sweden
- Province: Uppland
- County: Stockholm County
- Municipality: Lidingö Municipality

Area
  - Total: 1.22 km^{2} (0.47 sq mi)

Population (31 December 2010)
  - Total: 2,943
  - Density: 2,417/km^{2} (6,260/sq mi)
- Time zone: UTC+1 (CET)
  - Summer (DST): UTC+2 (CEST)

Sticklinge udde is a locality situated in Lidingö Municipality, Stockholm County, Sweden with 2,943 inhabitants in 2010. The locality corresponds to the northern part of Sticklinge.
