= Gåshaga brygga =

Tram station on Lidingö island, Sweden

Coordinates: 59.3569°N 18.2339°E

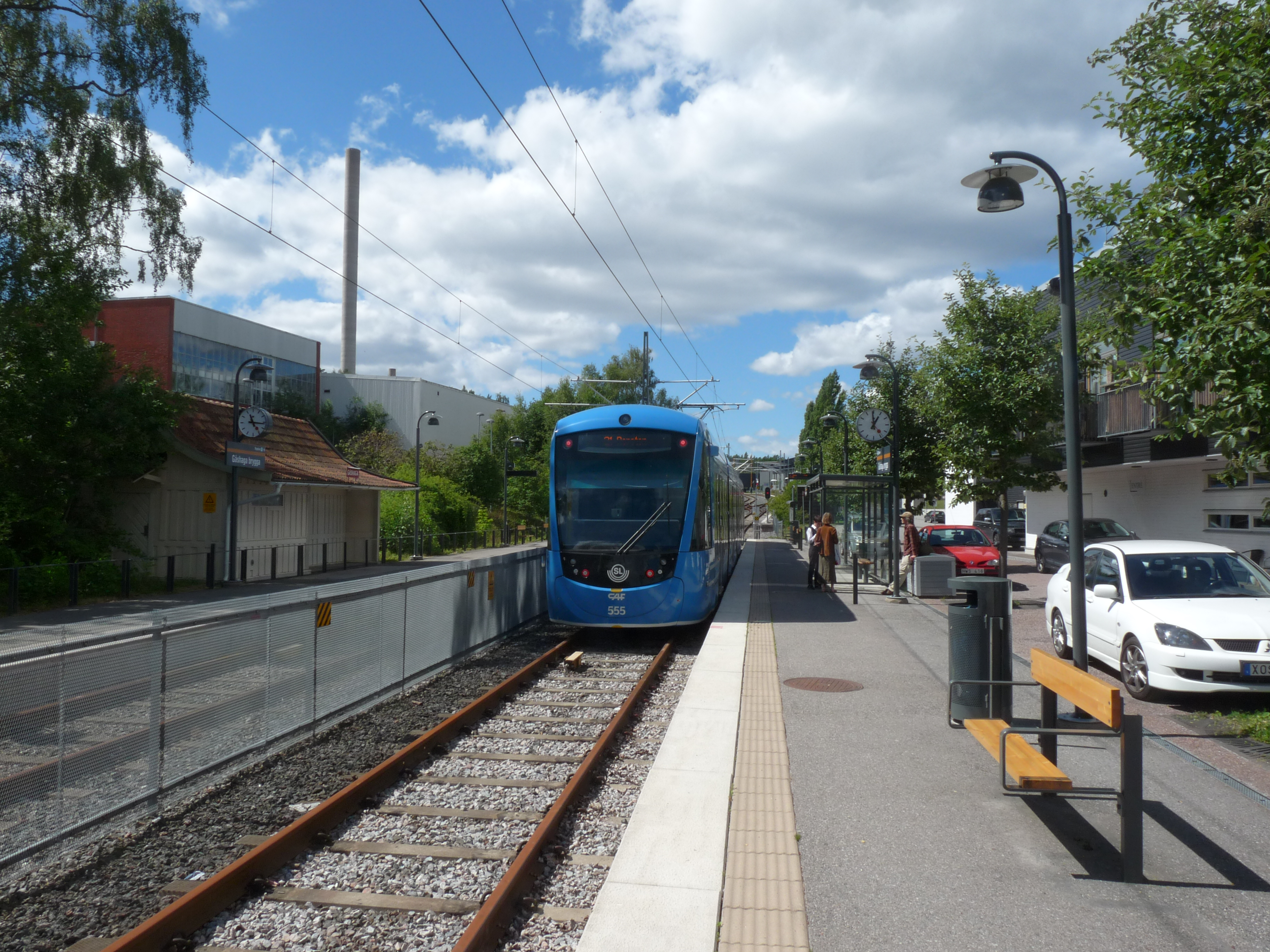

Gåshaga brygga (Gåshaga jetty) is the eastern terminus of the Lidingöbanan light rail in Lidingö east of central Stockholm, Sweden. It is possible to interchange with the Waxholmsbolaget archipelago boats at this stop.

The current Gåshaga brygga stop was inaugurated on May 7, 2001 after rebuilding the stretch from the Gåshaga stop down to the water, a portion of the line that hadn't been in use since 1946.
