= Tranholmen =

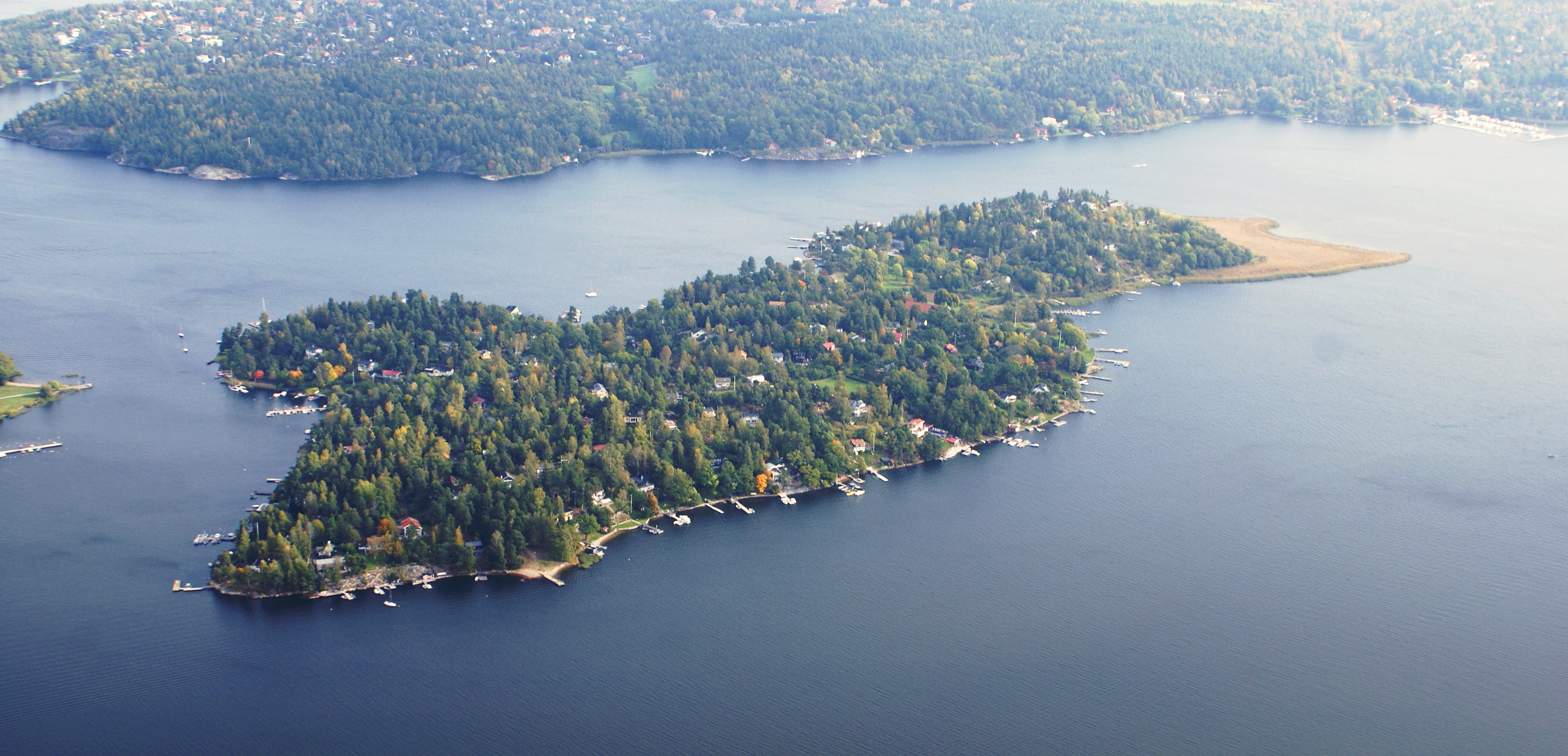

- Location within Stockholm Location within Sweden Location within European Union
- Coordinates: 59°22′30″N 18°05′21″E
- Country: Sweden
- Province: Uppland
- County: Stockholm County
- Municipality: Danderyd Municipality

Area
  - Total: 0.41 km^{2} (0.16 sq mi)

Population (31 December 2020)
  - Total: 427
  - Density: 1,000/km^{2} (2,700/sq mi)
- Time zone: UTC+1 (CET)
  - Summer (DST): UTC+2 (CEST)

Tranholmen is a locality situated in Danderyd Municipality, Stockholm County, Sweden with 338 inhabitants in 2010. It is an island in Lilla Värtan, Sweden, less than 100 meters off the Danderyd coastline. In the winter season, when the water is frozen and travel by boat thus is impossible, a floating bridge connects the island to the mainland.
