= Hemmesta =

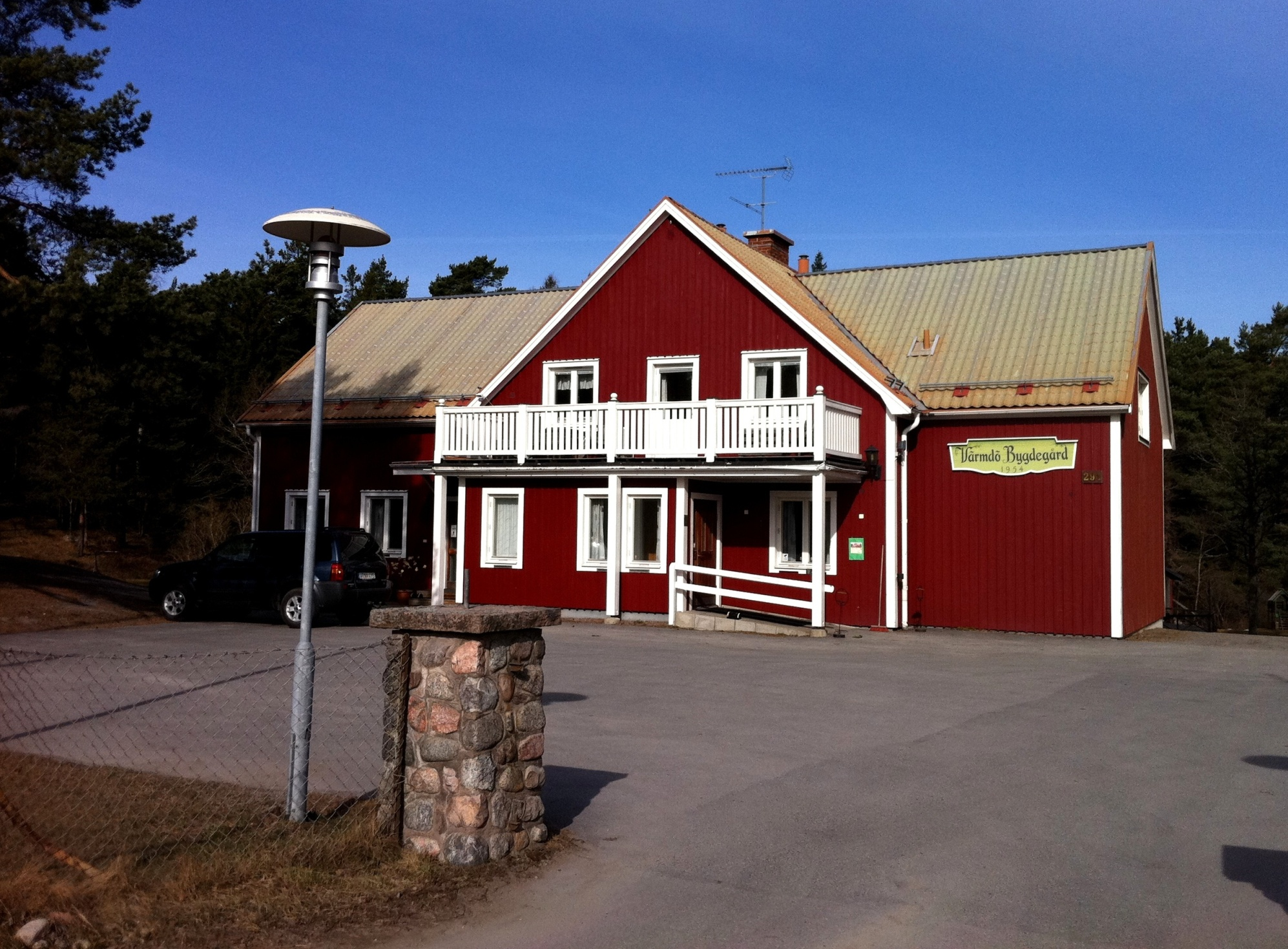
- Community center in Hemmesta

- Location within Stockholm Location within Sweden
- Coordinates: 59°19′N 18°30′E
- Country: Sweden
- Province: Uppland
- County: Stockholm County
- Municipality: Värmdö Municipality

Area
  - Total: 3.40 km^{2} (1.31 sq mi)

Population (31 December 2010)
  - Total: 5,240
  - Density: 1,542/km^{2} (3,990/sq mi)
- Time zone: UTC+1 (CET)
  - Summer (DST): UTC+2 (CEST)

Hemmesta is a locality situated on the island of Värmdö in Sweden's Stockholm archipelago. From an administrative perspective, it is located in Värmdö Municipality and Stockholm County, and has 5,240 inhabitants as of 2010.
