= Lidingöbron =

Two existing and two historical bridges in Sweden

Coordinates: 59°21′38″N 18°06′38″E

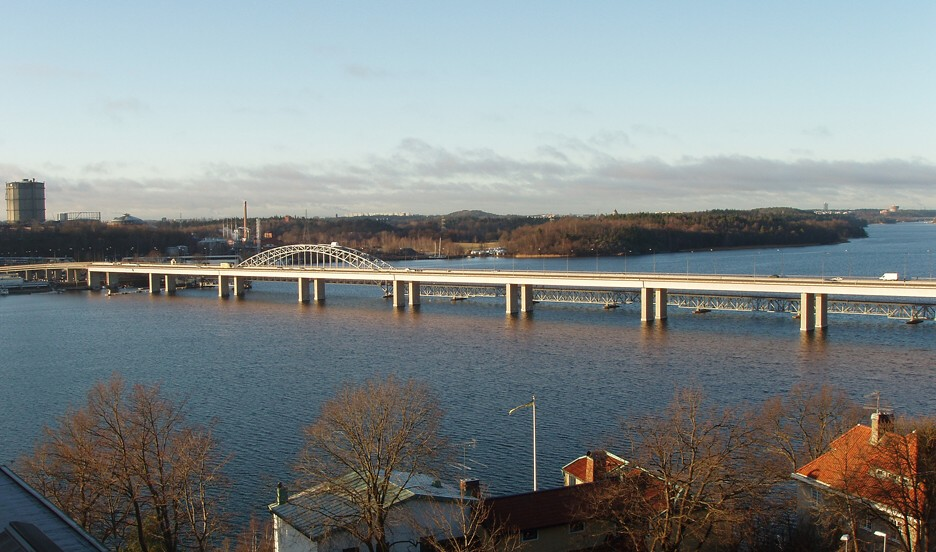
The two bridges connecting Lidingö with Stockholm. View from Hotel Foresta towards Ropsten. The latest bridge, built in 1971, in the foreground.

Lidingöbron (lit. 'The Lidingö Bridge') is the name of two existing and three historical bridges in Sweden across the strait of Lilla Värtan between the mainland Norra Djurgården at Ropsten, at the eastern part of Stockholm, and the island of Lidingö.

== History ==
=== First pontoon bridge ===
At a parish meeting in 1802, the inhabitants of Lidingö, at the time a mostly agricultural district, decided to open a venture to realize a pontoon bridge connecting the island to Stockholm. The 50 shares of the company had to be redeemed by contributing to the project with timber, work, or money and the bridge was completed in 1803; almost 800 metres (2,600 ft) long, 7 metres (23 ft) wide and financed by tolls. It was one of the longest bridges in Europe, and it was located around 2 kilometres (1.2 mi) south of the present bridges. It had a hard time surviving the annual ice break-up, and a third of it was demolished in 1811, and most of it in 1858 — each time raising the price for milk in the capital, as most of it was produced on Lidingö at the time.

=== Second pontoon bridge ===
With the creation of the harbour of Värtahamnen, the original bridge obstructed shipping in the strait, and it was therefore bought by the city of Stockholm in 1883 who replaced it 1884 with a new pontoon bridge, 12 metres (39 ft) wide and with two moveable sections at each end for the passage of ships. This bridge was located near the present bridge. The level of the roadway was only 10–15 centimetres (3.9–5.9 in) over the water surface however, so even moderate winds made crossing the bridge a tough experience. The lateral stability of the bridge was ensured by means of logs attached to the bridge every 24 metres (79 ft) and anchored to the bottom. The use of logs instead of chains effectively increased the bridge's general buoyancy at the cost of its stability during low tide - the bridge often serpentined its way across the water while the inclination of the roadway at the two ends made use of extra horses necessary. Heavy trucks started to use the bridge, for which it was not constructed. Ice break-up destroyed a third of the bridge in 1918.

=== Old Lidingöbron ===
By the end of World War I, the increasing number of motor cars made a more able bridge necessary, and by 1925 a steel truss bridge, 9.1 metres (30 ft) wide with a 6.7-metre (22 ft) long roadway, finally replaced the second pontoon bridge. It had two railway tracks in the same carriageway as the road.

To avoid foundation work at the maximum depth a 140-metre (460 ft) long truss arch was used, and the bridge was provided with a simple 20-metre (66 ft) long bascule leaf in order to allow a vertical navigation clearance of 5.3 metres (17 ft).

After the new bridge was built 1971, cars were no longer allowed on the old bridge. It had one rail track which was also rebranded to a tramway (or light rail line), the Lidingöbanan. The other half of the bridge was used for bicycles and pedestrians.

It was torn down in 2023 after the Little Lidingöbron was opened in 2022, because the Old Lidingöbron was considered in a bad shape.

=== New Lidingöbron ===
The population of Lidingö as well as the traffic continued to grow however, and by the 1950s the old bridge had become insufficient. The two municipalities met in 1961, and the following year it was settled a new road bridge should be located south of the old. The new road bridge, inaugurated in 1971, is 997 metres (3,271 ft) long, 24 metres (79 ft) (3+3 lanes) wide, and offers a navigation clearance of 12.5 metres (41 ft) while the roadway passes 75 metres (246 ft) above the bottom of the strait. The part of the bridge passing over water, 724 metres (2,375 ft) long, is made of double box girders with a maximum span of 73.5 metres (241 ft), the entire construction resting on steel poles filled with concrete.

=== Little Lidingöbron ===
Little Lidingöbron is a double track tram bridge with bicycle path. The length is 750 meters. It was built because the Old Lidingöbron was considered in a bad shape. It was opened for bicycles and pedestrians in May 2022, while tram traffic delayed to 26 May 2024 due to technical problems.

== Image gallery ==
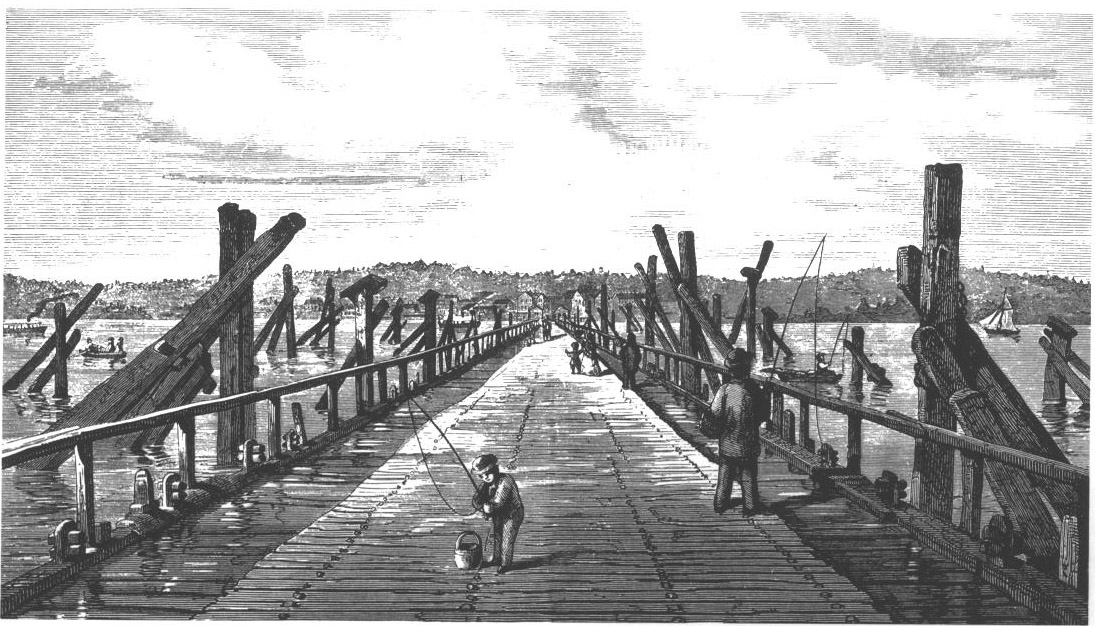
First pontoon bridge, built in 1803. View from Larsberg at Lidingö.

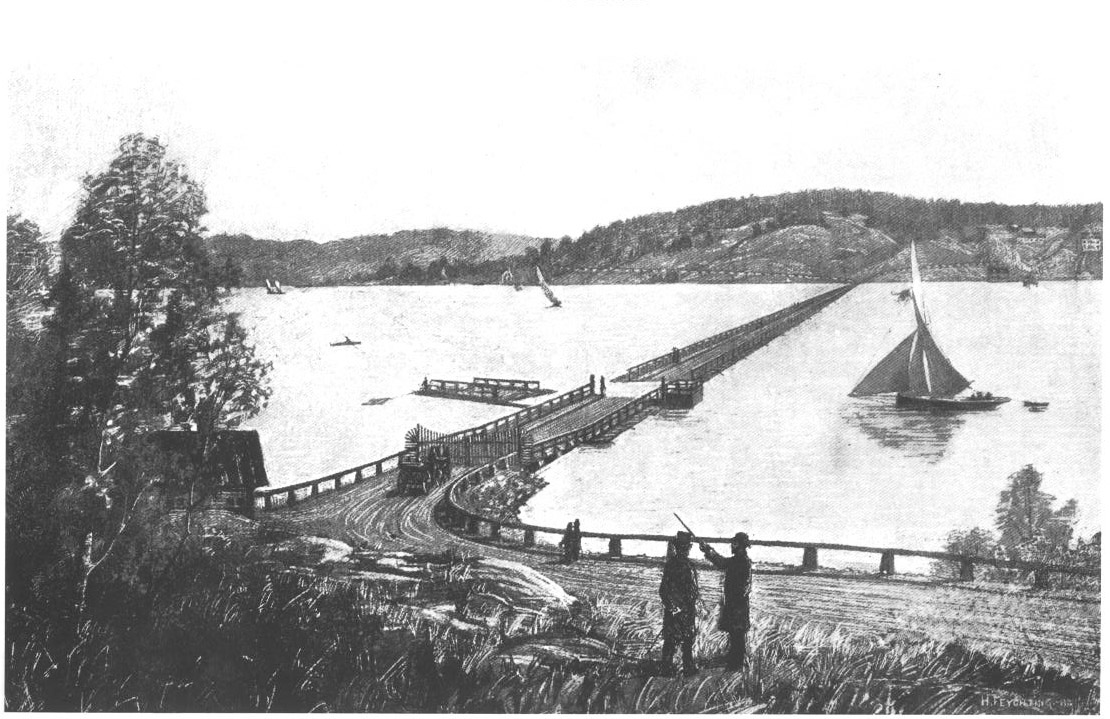
Second pontoon bridge, built in 1884. View from Ropsten.

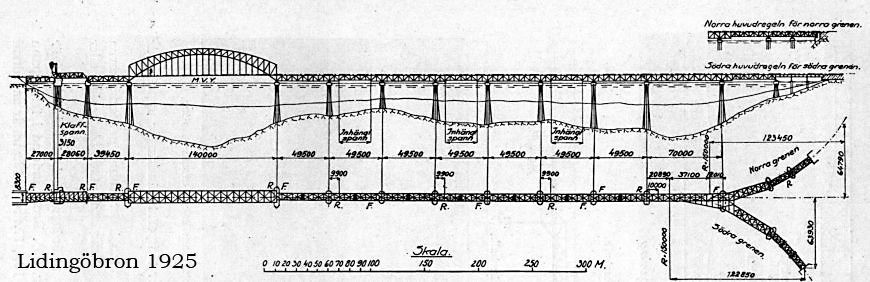
Drawing for the "Old" Lidingö bridge, built in 1925.

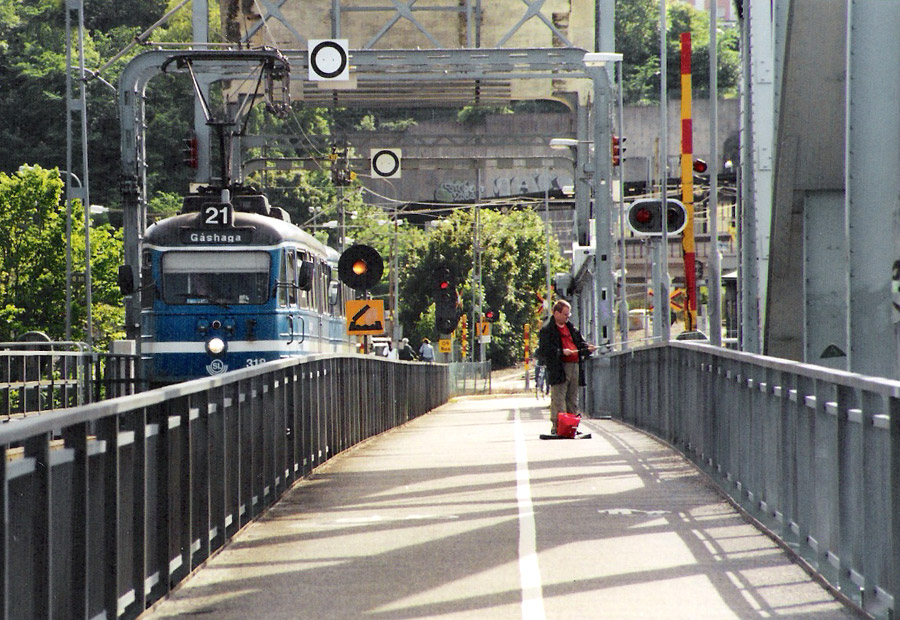
View from the bridge built in 1925 with a tram heading for Gåshaga and a man fishing from the bridge.

== Sources ==
- Lidingöbron in Swedish.

== See also ==
- List of bridges in Stockholm
