= Solsidan, Ekerö Municipality =

Solsidan
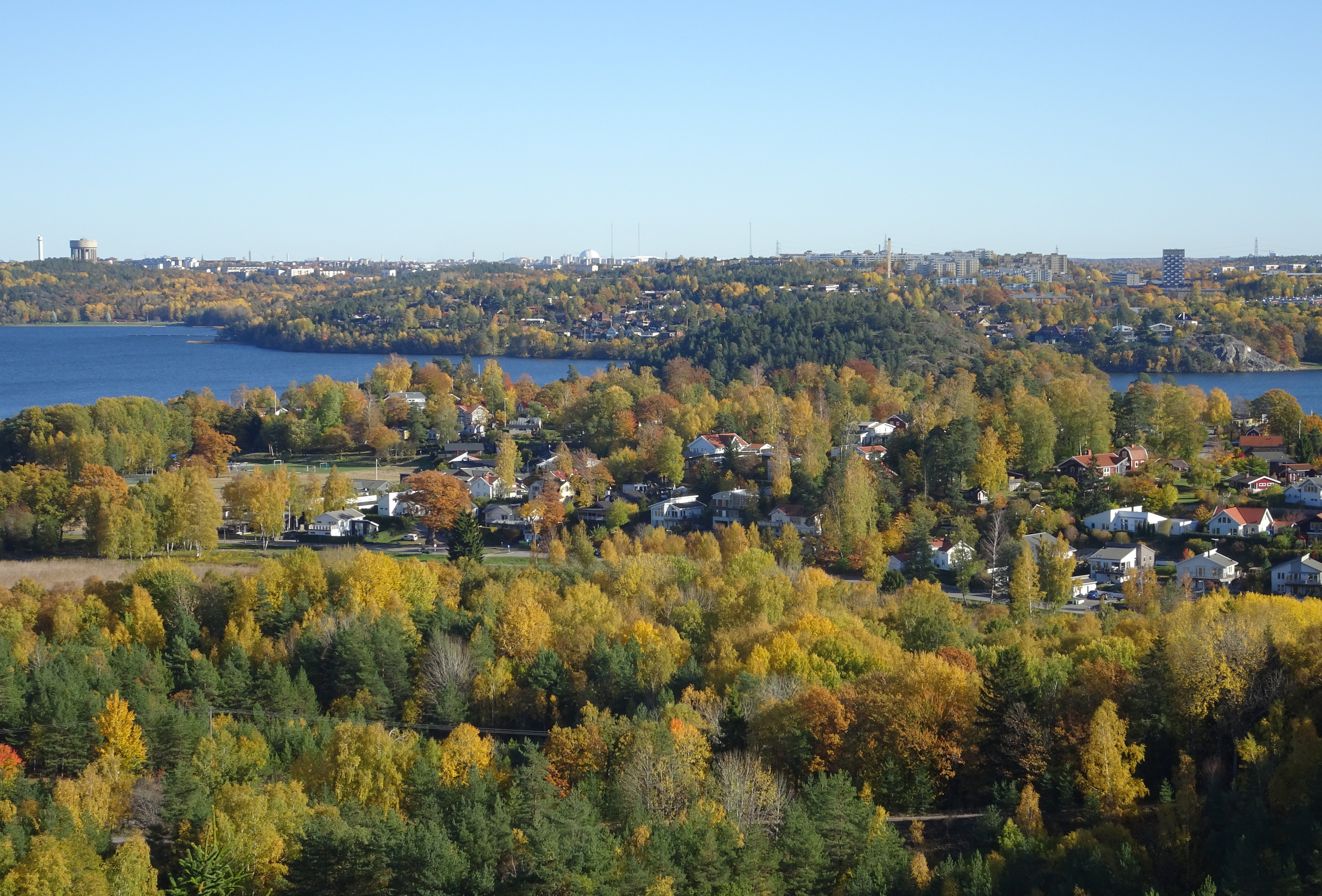
- View of Solsidan taken in 2017.

- Location within Stockholm Location within Sweden
- Coordinates: 59°17′N 17°51′E
- Country: Sweden
- Province: Uppland
- County: Stockholm County
- Municipality: Ekerö Municipality

Area
  - Total: 0.23 km^{2} (0.089 sq mi)

Population (31 December 2010)
  - Total: 349
  - Density: 1,489/km^{2} (3,860/sq mi)
- Time zone: UTC+1 (CET)
  - Summer (DST): UTC+2 (CEST)

Solsidan is a locality in Ekerö Municipality, Stockholm County, Sweden. It had 349 inhabitants in 2010.
