= Lidingöbanan =

Light rail line on Lidingö island in Stockholm, Sweden

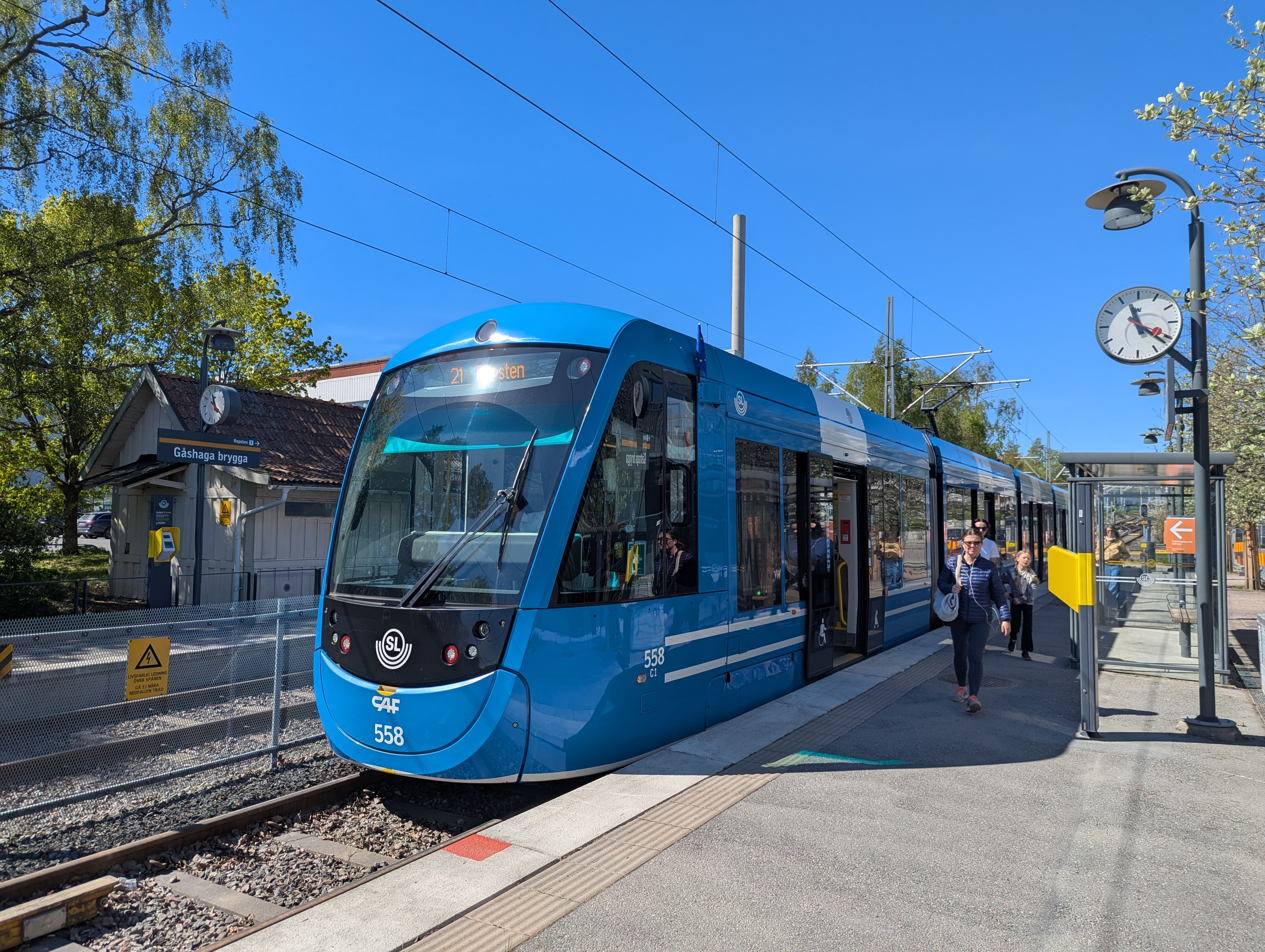
- A tram at Gåshaga brygga, Lidingö

Overview
- Status: Active
- Locale: Lidingö
- Termini: Ropsten; Gåshaga brygga
- Stations: 13

Service
- Type: Light-rail/Tram
- System: Storstockholms Lokaltrafik
- Services: 1
- Route number: L21
- Operator: AB Stockholms Spårvägar
- Depot: AGA
- Daily ridership: 14,300 boardings (2019)

History
- Opened: 1914; 112 years ago

Technical
- Line length: 9.2 km (5.7 mi)
- Track length: 9.2 km (5.7 mi)
- Track gauge: 1,435 mm (4 ft 8 1/2 in) standard gauge
Route map

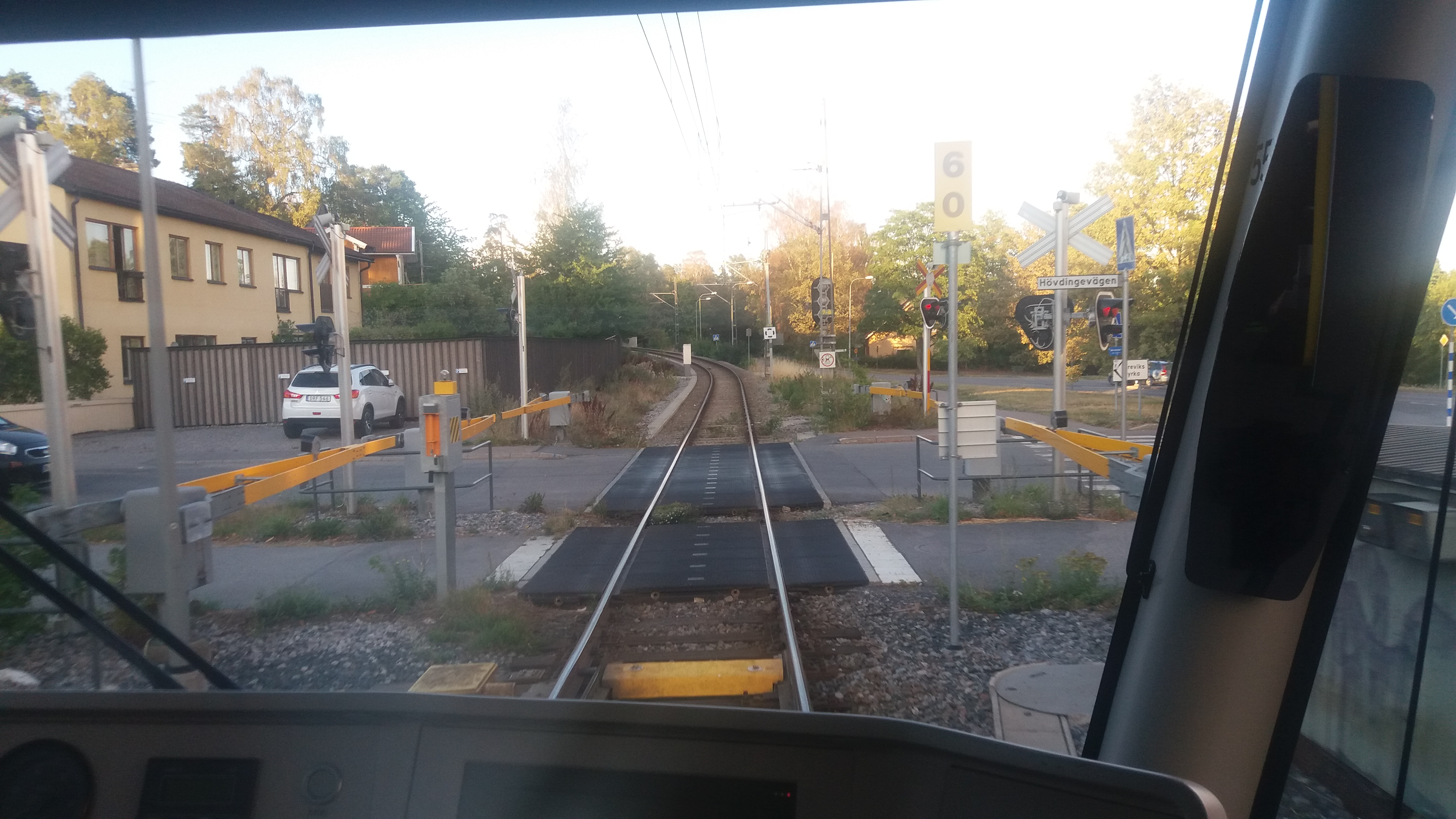
Railway Crossing at Brevik Station

Lidingöbanan (lit. 'the Lidingö Line') is a light-rail line in Stockholm, Sweden, between Ropsten and Gåshaga brygga, serving the southern half of Lidingö island.

== History ==
The Lidingöbanan has its origins in the Stockholm-Södra Lidingöns Järnväg (Stockholm-Southern Lidingö Railway), proposed by inventor Gustaf Dalén, opened for traffic 1914. It got ferry-less access to Stockholm when the Lidingö bridge was opened 1925. Public transportation on Lidingöbanan has always been provided using tram cars, but in the past Lidingöbanan also carried goods traffic. At its largest, Lidingöbanan extended to Humlegården in Stockholm through Stockholms Spårvägar's tramway network, with access to the Värtabanan freight railway track. There was also traffic on a track on the north side of Lidingö island which terminated at Kyrkviken, but that section closed in 1971. Lidingö town centre is now accessible only by bus. Lidingöbanan formally became part of SL's public transportation network in 1972.

== Tramway ==
Lidingöbanan was legally a railway until 31 March 2009, when it was reclassified by the Swedish railway inspectorate (Järnvägsstyrelsen). Freight train traffic existed 1925–1982. Passenger service has, however, always been provided by tramcars, which prior to 1967 continued onto the streets of Stockholm, as mentioned above. The electrical infrastructure (overhead wire) is of tram type.

The line was closed between the summer of 2013 and October 2015 for engineering works, modernisation and installation of new equipment, with rail replacement buses running during that period. When reopened parts of the single track line had been converted to double track, and new Type A36 trams were introduced, along with a new signalling system.

== Lines ==
Lidingöbanan has a single line with thirteen stations, from Ropsten in northeast Stockholm to Gåshaga brygga in southeastern Lidingö. At Ropsten there is an interchange with the Stockholm Metro Red Line 13, and a Waxholmsbolaget archipelago boat terminal at Gåshaga brygga.

There are plans to connect the line with the Spårväg City line in central Stockholm.

Line	Stretch	Length	Stops
21	Ropsten – Gåshaga brygga	9.2 km	13

== Rolling stock ==
Until closing down for modernisation in 2013, the rolling stock consisted of so-called Ängbyvagn, Type A30/A30B and B30/B30B manoeuver trams, all over fifty years old, and dating from the period (1940s–50s) when the Stockholm Metro was only partially completed and these areas were served by trams, adapted for faster two-way traffic.

Since re-opening in 2015, there is new bi-directional Multiple units of Type SL A36 in operation. This is the designating of SL for low-floor EMU's of Type CAF Urbos AXL. They are equipped with automatic train control and Wi-Fi. The A36 is the four-part, longer variant of the Type A35, which is in service on Nockebybanan, Tvärbanan and Spårväg City as three-part units since 2013. The unit type A36 is adapted for traffic on the Lidingöbana and has a significantly higher passenger capacity with 100 seats. Otherwise, both CAF trams are identical. Both types are designed as single cars, but can also be operated in pairs. Recently (2024) there is nine units of type A36 (numbers 551 to 559), which are parked at the AGA depot for traffic operated by AB Stockholms Spårvägar on behalf of the Stockholm Region on the Lidingöbanan. Both types in comparison:

Type	Seats	Stands	Capacity	Length	Width	Total weight	Sections	Max. output	Max. speed	Operating since	ATC
A35	72	143	215	30.80 m	2.65 m	appr. 51 t	3	560 kW	90 km/h	2013	yes
A36	100	187	287	39.48 m	2.65 m	appr. 66 t	4	700 kW	90 km/h	2015	yes

^The data are based on 5 standing passengers per square metre. In the EPD about the type A35 it is calculated with 7, therefore this has been converted here to 5.

== See also ==
- Trams in Stockholm
- Public transport in Stockholm
- List of tram and light rail transit systems
