= Ropsten =

Cape at the eastern part of Stockholm mainland in Sweden

Coordinates: 59°21′28″N 18°06′14″E

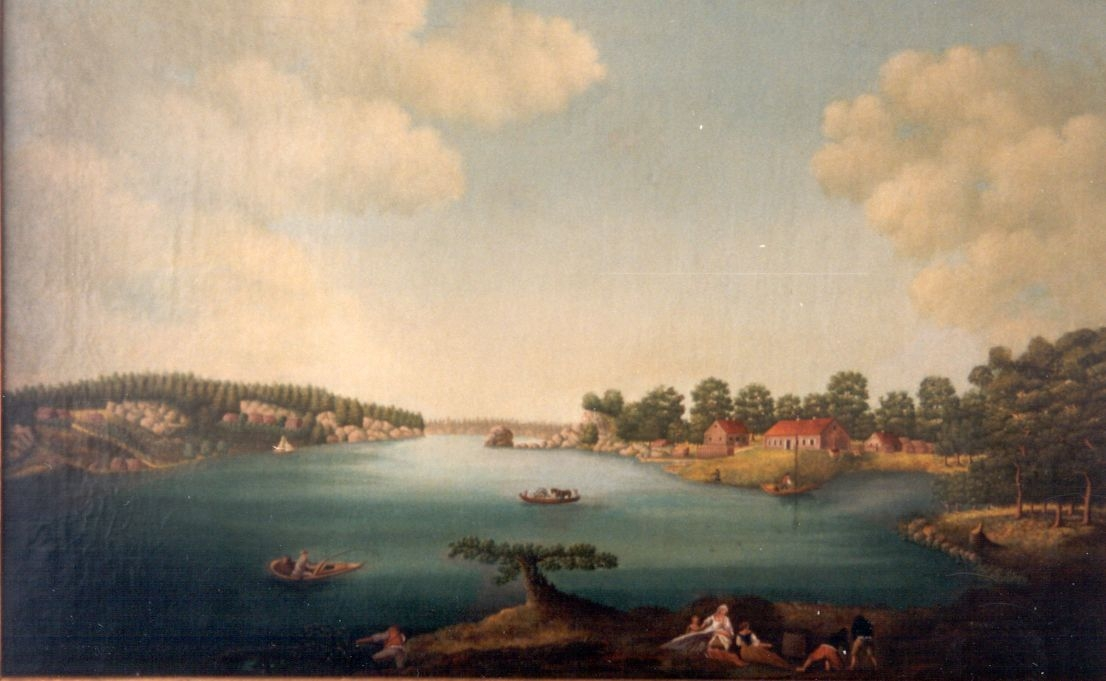
Painting by Piere Joseph Trere from 1795 showing the area around Ropsten before the first bridge was built between Stockholm (to the right) and Lidingö (to the left). The large rock in the middle of the painting has named the place. A ferry is on its way from Ropsten to Lidingö with a horse and cart on board.

Ropsten is a cape at the eastern point of the Stockholm mainland at the inner part of the Stockholm archipelago, in Sweden. Two bridges named Lidingöbron extend from Ropsten over to the island of Lidingö. The Ropsten area is located between Hjorthagen and the Stockholm city main port, Värtahamnen. Ropsten is the terminal station for the eastern part of Stockholm Metro system and is also the terminal station for Lidingöbanan, the railway for public transportation covering the area of Lidingö.

== History ==
Ropsten has been the communication centre for the traffic between Stockholm and Lidingö since the 13th or 14th century, when the first inhabitants settled on Lidingö and began farming, 200–300 years after the end of the Viking Age.

The name "Ropsten" stems from the fact that in old times, going back to the 13th or 14th century, people used to shout out loud from this area to Lidingö, a distance of about 750 metres, to call for a boat transport over to Lidingö, before the first regular rowboat ferry line was introduced and before the first bridge was built. In the old times, the part of the Ropsten area close to the waterfront was named Ropudden (corresponding to "cape shout"). The large rock or islet in the water close to this cape gave the place its name, "the rock at cape shout", Ropsten. The rock itself, however, was probably not used as a place to shout from, as it was surrounded by water (during average sea level conditions) according to old maps from the end of the 17th century, in particular a map from 1696. When there was an extreme low sea level it was probably possible to reach the rock by foot, as indicated on the painting by Piere Joseph Trere from 1795.

The entire area, named Ropsten, dramatically changed appearance in just a few years when the first bridge between Ropsten and Lidingö and the main port for Stockholm was built in this area from around 1884. Today nothing remains of the old Ropsten as it appears on the painting from 1795.

== Image gallery, Ropsten 1696–2008 ==
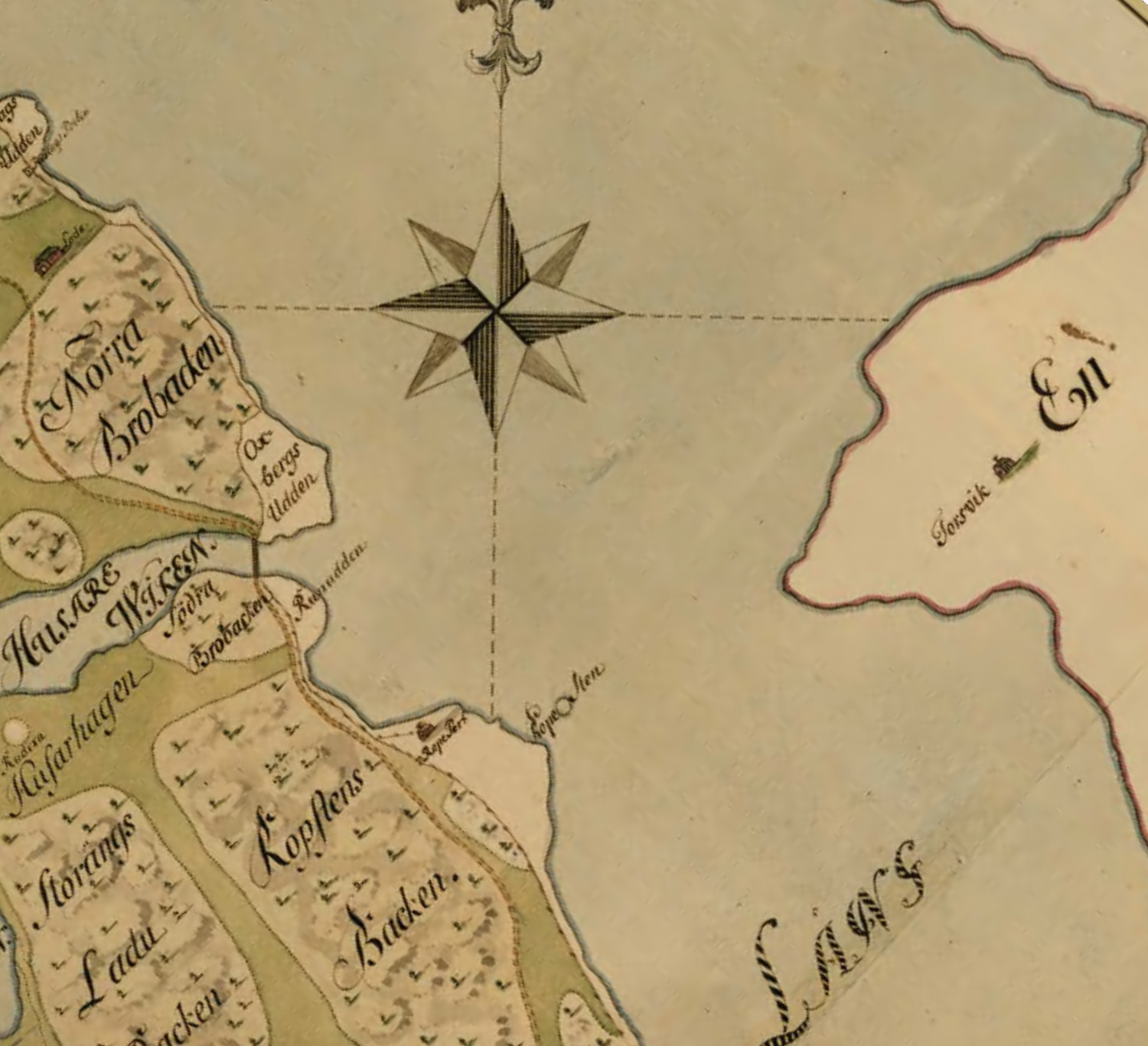
Map from 1696, covering the area around Ropsten.
Map orientation; north facing up.

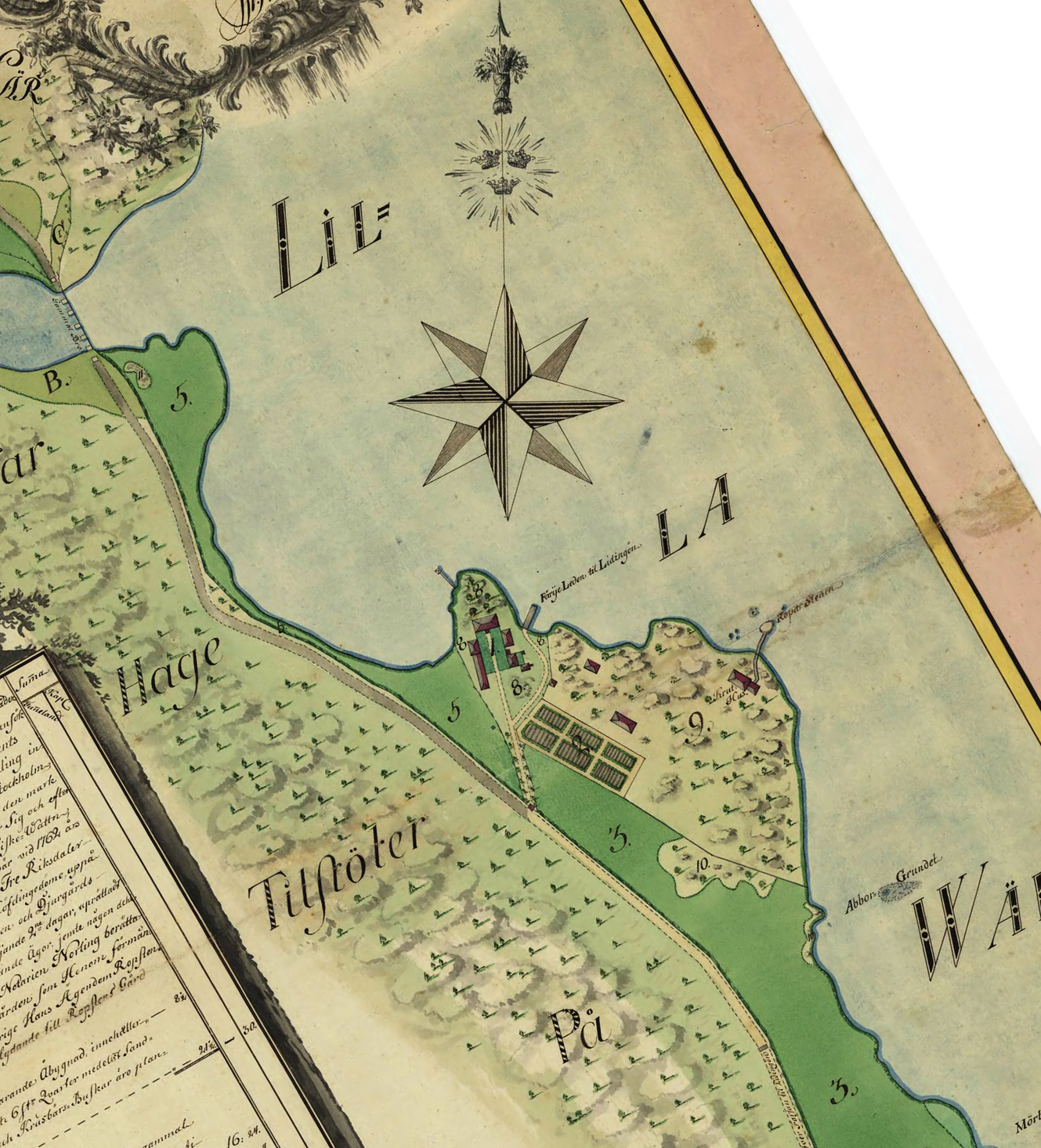
Map from 1784, covering the area around Ropsten.
Map orientation; north facing up.

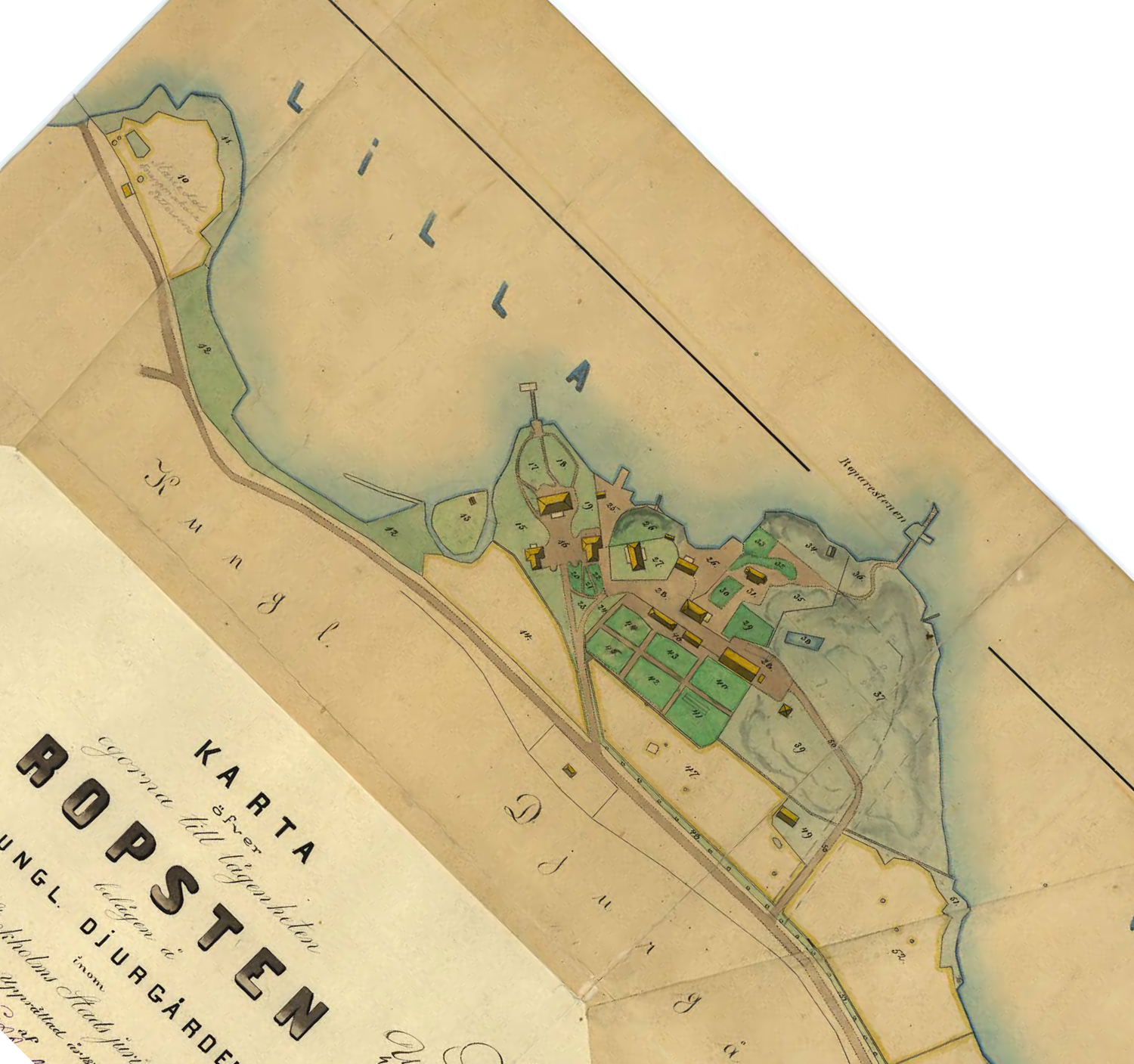
Map from 1874, covering the area around Ropsten.
Map orientation; north facing up.

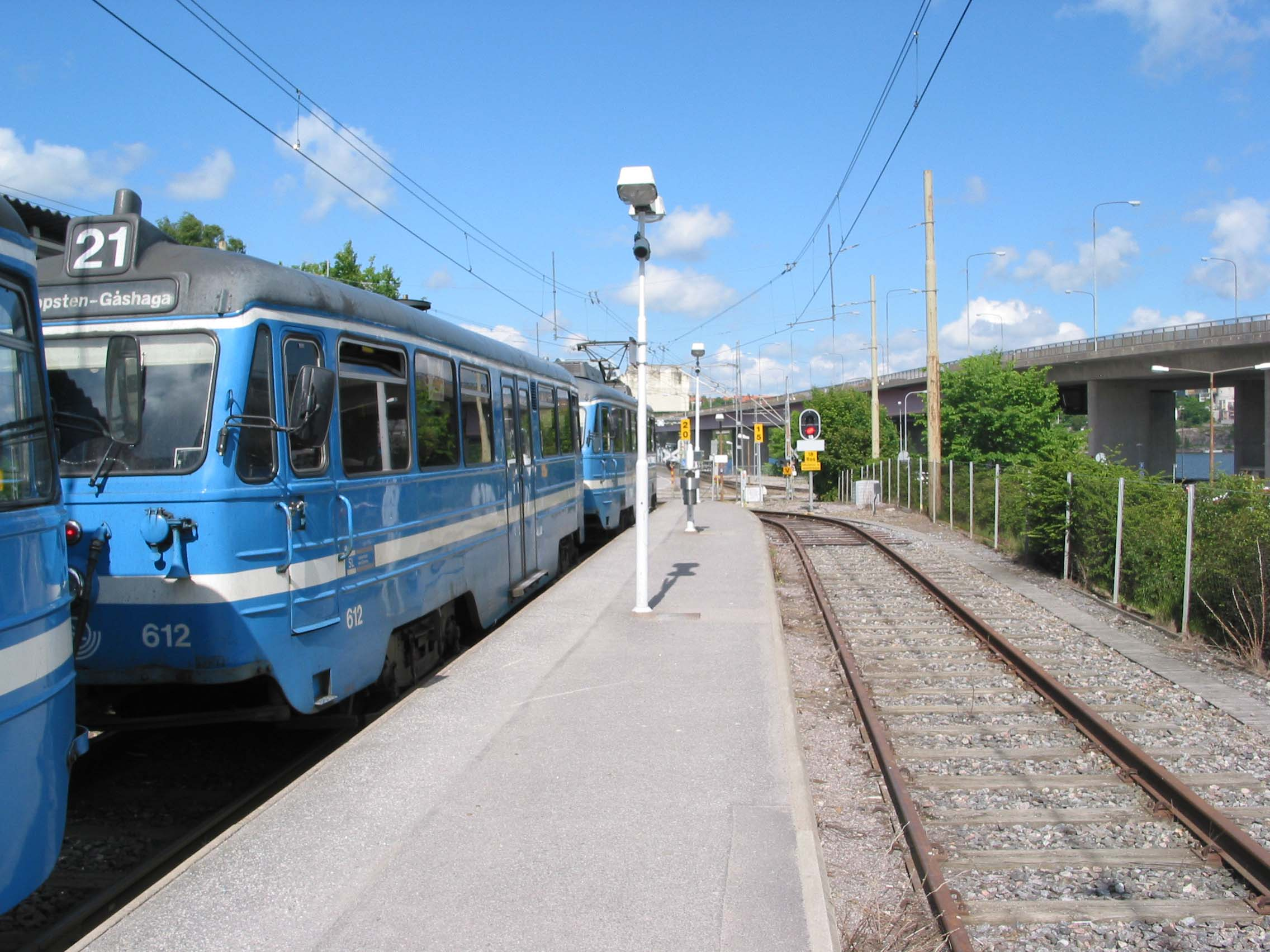
Lidingöbanan at Ropsten railway station

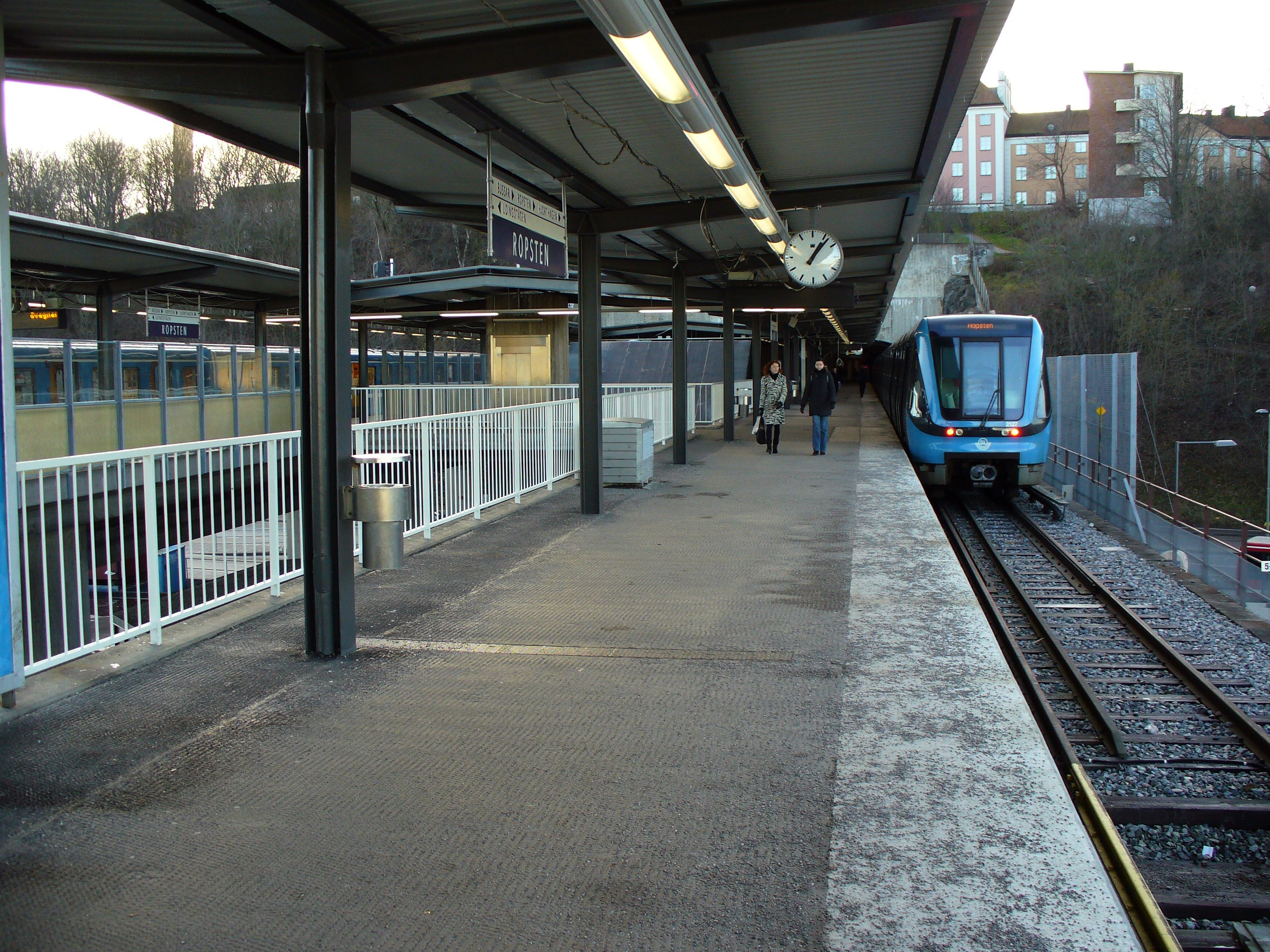
Metro platform at Ropsten station

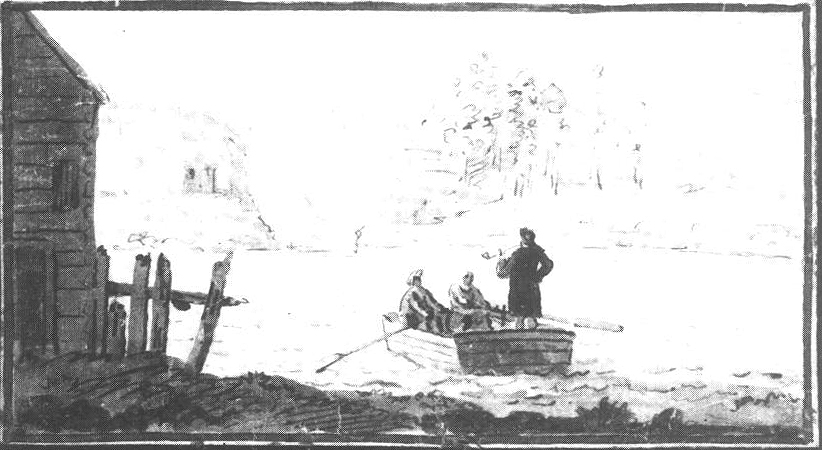
A painting showing Carl Michael Bellman leaving Lidingö in a rowboat ferry after a visit to the island in September 1789. The boat is the kind of broad boat normally used for transport of bulky goods, horses and cattle etc. with two rowers.
