= History of Sweden (1945–1967) =

This article covers the history of Sweden from the end of World War II to 1967.

== Overview ==
Sweden emerged unharmed by World War II. The Swedish non-alignment policy officially remained – Sweden rejected NATO membership but joined the United Nations and later EFTA. Tage Erlander of the Social Democratic party was Prime Minister from 1946 to 1969 – a period of exceptional economic and social prosperity, and generally low unemployment, but the housing situation posed problems as more and more people moved to the cities. Responding to the housing shortage, the government introduced the Million Programme – a national wave of suburban development with the aim of creating a million homes from 1965 to 1974. This period saw the beginning of large-scale immigration to a country that used to be one of the more ethnically homogeneous in the world. The first phase of immigration consisted of workers from southern Europe, who were actively wooed over by campaigns of advertisement and recruitment in their home countries, for instance Italy & Austria.

On 3 September 1967, Sweden was the last country in continental Europe to introduce right-hand traffic. This was done on Dagen H, in spite of the negative result of a referendum in 1955.

== Swedish neutrality in the Cold War ==
During the Cold War, Sweden maintained a dual approach: publicly, the strict neutrality policy was forcefully maintained but, unofficially, strong ties were kept with the US and it was hoped that the US would use conventional and nuclear weapons to strike at Soviet staging areas in the occupied Baltic states in case of a Soviet attack on Sweden. Over time and due to the official neutrality dogma, fewer and fewer Swedish military officials were aware of the military cooperation with the west, making such cooperation in the event of war increasingly difficult. At the same time, Swedish defensive planning was completely based on help from abroad in the event of war. The fact that it was not permissible to mention this aloud eventually led to the Swedish armed forces becoming highly unbalanced. For example, a strong ability to defend against an amphibious invasion was maintained while an ability to strike at inland staging areas was almost completely absent. In the 1970s and 1980s, Sweden's military expenditure per capita was the highest in the world. Because of neutrality politics, most military equipment was produced and developed in Sweden by companies such as SAAB, Kockums, Bofors and Hägglund & Söner. Prime minister Olof Palme summarized Swedish neutrality in a speech in 1985: Vi står för Sveriges oberoende i fred och kommer med fasthet att värna vårt territorium mot varje inkräktare (en: We stand for Sweden's independence in peacetime and will, with firmness, defend our territory against every foreign intruder).

In the early 1960s, US nuclear submarines armed with mid-range Polaris A-1 nuclear missiles were deployed outside the Swedish west coast. Range and safety considerations made this a good area from which to launch a retaliatory nuclear strike on Moscow. The submarines had to be very close to the Swedish coast to hit their intended targets; as a consequence of this, in 1960, the same year that the submarines were first deployed, the US provided Sweden with a military security guarantee. The US promised to provide military force in aid of Sweden in case of Soviet aggression. This guarantee was kept secret from the Swedish public until 1994, when a Swedish research commission exposed evidence of it.

As part of the military cooperation, the US provided much help in the development of the Saab 37 Viggen, as a strong Swedish air force was seen as necessary to keep Soviet anti-submarine aircraft from operating in the missile launch area. In return, Swedish scientists at the Royal Institute of Technology made considerable contributions to enhancing the targeting performance of the Polaris missiles.

== Population change ==
Since 1930, emigration became minimal. About 15,000-30,000 people left Sweden annually after 1965. Sweden welcomed refugees and displaced persons at the end of World War II. Because of the low birth rate, immigration accounted for 45% of population growth between 1945 and 1980.

Sweden became highly urbanized after World War II, reaching 83% urban in 1990. As recently as 1940 only 38% of the population lived in urban areas, and in 1860, before industrialization, the proportion was only 11%. Large-scale movement from the countryside to the United States ended about 1900. Since 1945 the movement to Swedish cities accelerated, causing a population decline in many areas, especially in the north.

== Culture and mass media ==
Cultural influence from the United Kingdom and the United States became obvious following the war, having displaced German influences. Imported and indigenous subcultures rose, with the rockabilly-inspired raggare and anarchist progg cultures as notable examples. Swedish film and music achieved international fame with names like Ingmar Bergman, Sven Nykvist, Lasse Hallström and Birgit Nilsson.

The sexual revolution, together with sexual content in mass media (notably films 491 and I Am Curious (Yellow), together with the broad entry of women in many lanes of professional life (including the priesthood) in the 1960s and 1970s provoked a moralist counter-movement including the Christian Democratic party, but this trend has had scant political success.

Radio and television early became widespread in Sweden, but government struggled to keep the monopoly of licence-funded Sveriges television until the late 1980s, as satellite and cable TV became popular, and the commercial channel TV4 was permitted to broadcast terrestrially.

== Sports ==
Sweden produced many world-famous athletes during this period, among them boxer Ingemar Johansson and ice hockey player Börje Salming. Sweden hosted several high-profile sports events, for instance equestrian events of the 1956 Summer Olympics and the 1958 FIFA World Cup.
