= Rail directions =

General or logical direction of a railway line or service

Rail directions are used to describe train directions on rail systems. The terms used may be derived from such sources as compass directions, altitude directions, or other directions. These directions are often specific to system, country, or region.

== Radial directions ==
Many rail systems use the concept of a centre or origin (usually a major city) to define rail directions. Often this location will also define the zero kilometre- or milepost of a line or network.

=== Up and down ===
==== United Kingdom ====
In British practice, railway directions are usually described as "up" and "down", with "up" being towards a major location. This convention is applied not only to the trains and the tracks, but also to items of lineside equipment and to areas near a track. Since British trains run on the left, the "up" side of a line is usually on the left when proceeding in the "up" direction.

On most of the network, "up" is the direction towards London as the busiest transport hub. In most of Scotland, with the exception of the West and East Coast Main Lines, and the Borders Railway, "up" is towards Edinburgh. The Valley Lines network around Cardiff has its own usage, relating to the literal meaning of travelling "up" (away from Cardiff) and "down" (towards Cardiff) the valley. On the former Midland Railway "up" was towards Derby. On the Northern Ireland Railways network, "up" generally means toward Belfast (the specific zero milepost varying from line to line); except for cross-border services to Dublin, where Belfast is "down". Mileposts normally increase in the "down" direction, but there are exceptions, such as the Trowbridge line between Bathampton Junction and Hawkeridge Junction, where mileage increases in the "up" direction.

Individual tracks will have their own names, such as Up Main or Down Loop. Trains running towards London are normally referred to as "up" trains, and those away from London as "down". Hence the down Night Riviera runs to Penzance and the up Flying Scotsman to London King's Cross. This distinction is less meaningful for trains not travelling towards or away from London; for instance a CrossCountry train from Manchester to Bournemouth uses "up" lines as far as Reading and "down" lines thereafter.

==== Australia ====
The railway systems of the Australian states have generally followed the practices of railways in the United Kingdom. Railway directions are usually described as "up" and "down", with "up" being towards the major location in most states, which is usually the capital city of the state. In New South Wales, trains running away from Sydney are "down" trains, while in Victoria, trains running away from Melbourne are "down" trains. An interstate train travelling from Sydney to Melbourne is a "down" train until it crosses the state border at Albury, where it changes its classification to an "up" train. Even in states that follow this practice, exceptions exist for individual lines. In the state of Queensland, "up" and "down" directions are individually defined for each line. Therefore, a train heading towards the main railway station in Brisbane (Roma Street station) would be classified as an "up" train on some lines but as a "down" train on other lines. In South Australia, there are two up/down origins: Port Augusta and Adelaide.

==== China ====
In China, railway directions with terminus in Beijing are described as "up" (Chinese: 上行, romanised: shàngxíng) and "down" (Chinese: 下行, romanised: xiàxíng), with "up" towards Beijing; while trains leaving Beijing are "down". Trains run through Beijing may have two or more numbers, for example, the train from Harbin to Shanghai K58/55 uses two different numbers: on the Harbin–Tianjin section, the train runs toward Beijing, the train is known as K58, but on the Tianjin–Shanghai section, the train is known as K55; the opposite train from Shanghai to Harbin is known as K56/57, while K56 is used from Shanghai to Tianjin and K57 is used from Tianjin to Harbin. Generally even numbers denote trains travelling in the up direction while odd numbers denote the down direction.

==== Hong Kong ====
In Hong Kong, most lines have their "down" direction towards the terminal closer to Central, with the exception of Disneyland Resort line, where the down line is towards Disneyland to be consistent with Tung Chung line where it branches from. On Tuen Ma line, the "down" end is Wu Kai Sha. The up/down direction was switched in the former Ma On Shan line such that it could be connected with the former West Rail line. The direction is signposted along the track, with the mileage increasing in the up direction, and also on the platform ends.

==== Japan ====
In Japan, railway directions are traditionally designated as "up" (上り, Nobori) and "down" (下り, Kudari). For JR Group services, trains heading towards Tokyo Station are considered "up" trains, while those heading away are "down" trains. Notable exceptions include the Yamanote Line and the Osaka Loop Line, which are circular routes. Another exception is the Keihin-Tōhoku Line and other through-running services that pass through Tokyo Station. Because this route is officially part of the Tōhoku Main Line north of Tokyo Station and the Tōkaidō Main Line south of it, trains are instead referred to as northbound or southbound. For private railway operators, the designation of "up" or "down" (if used at all) typically depends on the location of the company’s headquarters, with trains heading toward that location treated as "up" services.

==== Sweden ====
In Sweden, "up" trains are generally trains heading north, while "down" trains are trains heading south. Trains in Sweden generally run on the left, (unlike roads which switched to running on the right in 1967), and so the up line (uppspår) refers to the left-hand track as viewed from an "up" train, while the down line (nedspår) is the left-hand track for "down" trains. Even numbers are always used for "up" trains while odd numbers are always used for "down" trains; however, bidirectional signalling is common, and thus trains do not necessarily use the track corresponding to their designation.

==== Taiwan ====
In Taiwan, trains travelling north towards Keelung on the Western Trunk Line and towards Badu on the Yilan Line are considered "up" trains. However, on other parts of the network, the terminology "clockwise" and "counter-clockwise" is used instead.

=== Inbound and outbound ===
In many commuter rail and rapid transit services in the United States, the rail directions are related to the location of the city centre. The term inbound is used for the direction leading in toward the city centre and outbound is used for the opposite direction leading out of the city centre.

=== City name directions ===
Some British rail directions commonly used are London and Country. The London end of a station platform or train is the end nearer to London. First class accommodation, where provided, is usually at this end. The country end is the opposite end. This usage is problematic where more than one route to London exists (e.g. at Exeter St Davids via Salisbury or Bristol, or Edinburgh Waverley).

=== Even and odd ===
==== France ====
In France, railway directions are usually described as Pair and Impair (meaning Even and Odd), corresponding to Up and Down in the British system. Pair means heading toward Paris, and Impair means heading away from Paris. This convention is applied not only to the trains and the tracks, but also to items of lineside equipment. Pair is also quasi-homophonic with Paris, so direction P is equivalent either with direction Pair or with direction [à] Paris.

==== Italy ====
A similar system is in use in Italy, where directions can be Pari or Dispari (Even and Odd respectively). Pari (Even) trains conventionally travel north- and west-bound. The city of Paris is referenced in colloquial use (Parigi in Italian), with Pari trains virtually leading towards it (Paris being in a north-western direction from any point in Italy).

==== Netherlands ====
In the Netherlands even and odd train numbers are used to designate the direction of a given train. An even train number generally denotes a service running towards Amsterdam, and an odd train number denotes a service running away from Amsterdam - although this is not rigidly enforced. For example, on the Amsterdam Centraal to Almere Centrum route (series 2600), 2620 would be a service to Amsterdam, while 2621 would be a service from Amsterdam to Almere.

==== Poland ====
Similarly, Polish railways also use parzysty and nieparzysty (even and odd) to designate line directions, with odd directions usually heading away from Warsaw (with some exceptions in place) and thus functionally the equivalent of the British "down" direction. The odd direction is the direction of increasing mileage. With rail traffic in Poland operating on the right-hand side, down/odd tracks are usually on the right on double-track lines, and signalling equipment numbering follows this. Train numbers adhere to this directional principle to the extreme: trains entering a line in opposite direction of their previous line will change numbers accordingly (with numbering pairs: 0/1, 2/3, 4/5, 6/7, 8/9), and to give an example, 1300 and 1301 are the exact same train in Poland, thus can be named train 1300/1, with the even and odd numbers applying over different sections of its journey.

==== Soviet Union ====
In Russia and former-USSR countries the "even direction" is usually north- and eastbound, while the "odd direction" is south- and westbound. Trains travelling "even" and "odd" usually receive even and odd numbers as well as track and signal numbers, respectively.

== Circumferential directions ==
In double track loop lines – such as those encircling a city – the tracks, trains and trackside equipment can be identified by their relative distance from the centre of the loop. Inner refers to the track and its trains that are closer to the topological centre. Outer refers to the track and its trains that are furthermost from the topological centre. One example is the City Circle line in the Sydney Trains system.

For circle routes, the directions may indicate clockwise or counterclockwise (anti-clockwise) bound trains. For example, on the Circle line of London Underground or the loop of the Central line, the directions are often referred to as "inner rail" (anti-clockwise) or "outer rail" (clockwise).

The same practice is used for circle routes in Japan, such as the Yamanote Line in Tokyo and the Osaka Loop Line, where directions are usually referred to as "outer" (外回り, soto-mawari) and "inner" (内回り, uchi-mawari), in a system where trains go clockwise on the outer track and counter-clockwise on the inner track.

== Geographical directions ==
=== Cardinal directions ===
Most railroads in the United States use nominal cardinal directions for the directions of their lines, which often differ from actual compass directions. These directions are often referred to as "railroad" north, south, east, or west, to avoid confusion with the compass directions.

Typically an entire railroad system (the lines of a railroad or a related group of railroads) will describe all of its lines by only two directions, either east and west, or north and south. This greatly reduces the possibility of misunderstanding the direction in which a train is travelling as it traverses lines which may twist and turn or even reverse direction for a distance. These directions also have significance in resolving conflicts between trains running in opposite directions. For example, many railroads specify that trains of equal class running to the east are superior to those running west. This means that, if two trains are approaching a passing siding on a single-track line, the inferior westbound train must "take the siding" and wait there for the superior eastbound train to pass.

In the United States, most railroads use "east and west", and it is unusual for a railroad to designate "north and south" (the New York City Subway, the Chicago "L", and the Washington Metro are rare examples). Even-numbered trains (superior) travel east (or north). Odd-numbered trains (inferior) travel west (or south).

On the London Underground, geographic direction naming generally prevails (e.g. eastbound, westbound) except for the Circle line where it is Outer Rail and Inner Rail.

=== Other names for north and south ===
In New York City, the terms uptown and downtown are used in the subway to refer to northbound and southbound respectively. The nominal railroad direction is determined by how the line will travel when it enters the borough of Manhattan.

For railways in China that are not connected with Beijing, north and west are used as "up", and east and south as "down". Odd numbered train codes are used for "down" trains, while even numbers are used for "up"; for example, train T27 from Beijing West to Lhasa is "down" (going away from Beijing) since 27 is odd.

== Other ==
=== Germany ===
In Germany, the tracks outside of station limits are called "Regelgleis" (usual track) and "Gegengleis" (opposite track). As trains in Germany usually drive on the right side, the Regelgleis is typically the right-side track, with some exceptions. When the direction of travel changes, the tracks' names also change, so the names of the adjacent stations are added. For example, the usual track from A-town to B-ville would also be the opposite track from B-ville to A-town. If two or more lines run parallel (German railway lines can only have one or two tracks outside station limits by definition), the name of the railway line is also added (usually something like goods line, S-Bahn, long-distance tracks, regional tracks, etc.).

Before being called Regel- and Gegengleis, the tracks were referred to as "right" (as in correct) and "false" track, with the right track being on the right side. As the use of the word "false" implied that it was wrong to drive on it, Deutsche Bahn considered changing the names to "Right" and "Left" track. However, this would have led to some cases where the "Right" track would be on the left side of the line and vice versa.
