= Left- and right-hand traffic =

Directionality of traffic flow by jurisdiction

Countries by direction of road traffic, 2020s Left-hand traffic Right-hand traffic No data

Left-hand traffic (LHT) and right-hand traffic (RHT) are the practices, in bidirectional traffic, of keeping to the left side or to the right side of the road, respectively. They are fundamental to traffic flow, and are sometimes called a "rule of the road". The terms right- and left-hand "drive" refer to the position of the driver and the steering wheel in the vehicle and are, in automobiles, the reverse of the terms right- and left-hand "traffic". The rule also includes where on the road a vehicle is to be driven, if there is room for more than one vehicle in one direction, and the side on which the vehicle in the rear overtakes the one in the front. For example, a driver in an LHT country would typically overtake on the right of the vehicle being overtaken.

RHT is used in 165 countries and territories, while 75 countries use LHT, which account for about a sixth of the world's land area, a quarter of its roads, and about a third of its population.

While many of the countries using LHT were part of the British Empire, others such as Indonesia, Japan, Nepal, Bhutan, Macau, Thailand, and Mozambique were not. Sweden and Iceland, which have used RHT since September 1967 and late May 1968 respectively, previously used LHT. All of the countries that were part of the French Colonial Empire adopted RHT.

Between 1919 and 1986, 34 of the LHT territories switched to RHT. In 1919, 104 of the world's territories were LHT and an equal number were RHT. Switches have been motivated by factors such as changes in political administration, a desire for uniformity within a country or with neighboring states, and availability and affordability of vehicles.

In LHT, traffic keeps left and cars usually have the steering wheel on the right (RHD: right-hand drive) and roundabouts circulate clockwise. RHT is the opposite: traffic keeps right, the driver usually sits on the left side of the car (LHD: left-hand drive), and roundabouts circulate counterclockwise.

In most countries, rail traffic follows the handedness of the roads; but many of the countries that switched road traffic from LHT to RHT did not switch their trains. Boat traffic on bodies of water is RHT, regardless of location. Boats are traditionally piloted from the starboard (right) side, unlike RHT road traffic vehicles, to facilitate priority to the right.

== Background ==
Countries with left- and right-hand traffic, currently and formerly. Changes since 1858 when Finland changed to the right are taken into account. Has always driven on the right Formerly drove on the left, now drives on the right Has always driven on the left Formerly drove on the right, now drives on the left Formerly a mix of left and right in various parts of the country, now drives on the right No data *Note: there are no countries, with formerly a mix of left and right in various parts, which now drive on the left

To prevent traffic collisions, all societies adopted a rule that required traffic travelling in opposite directions to yield to the left or to yield to the right. Traffic approaching one another head-on would not collide if the drivers of both yielded to the same side.

Why some societies preferred or selected one over the other is not clear.

Some claims relate to the hand selected for holding horse reins, for self-defense with weapons, or controlling horses with whips. Academic Chris McManus notes that writers have stated that in 1300, Pope Boniface VIII directed pilgrims to keep left; others suggest that he directed them to keep to the right, and there is no documented evidence to back either claim.

== Geographical areas ==
=== Africa ===
LHT roundabout

RHT roundabout

Roundabout signs used in Southern African Development Community

The British Empire introduced LHT in the East Africa Protectorate (present-day Kenya), the Protectorate of Uganda, Tanganyika (formerly part of German East Africa; present-day Tanzania), Rhodesia (present-day Zambia and Zimbabwe), Eswatini, the Cape Colony (part of present-day South Africa) and Lesotho, as well as in British West Africa (present-day Ghana, Gambia, Sierra Leone and Nigeria); former British West Africa, however, has now switched to RHT, as all its neighbours, which are mostly former French territories, use RHT. South Africa introduced LHT in former German South West Africa, present-day Namibia, after the end of World War I.

Sudan, formerly part of Anglo-Egyptian Sudan, switched to RHT in 1973. Most of its neighbours were RHT countries, with the exception of Uganda and Kenya, but since the independence of South Sudan in 2011, all of its neighbours drive on the right (including South Sudan, despite its land borders with two LHT countries).

Although Portugal switched to RHT in 1928, its colony of Mozambique remained LHT because it has land borders with former British colonies (with LHT).

France introduced RHT in French West Africa and the Maghreb, where it is still used. Countries in these areas include Mali, Mauritania, Ivory Coast, Burkina Faso, Benin, Niger, Morocco, Algeria, and Tunisia. Other French former colonies that are RHT include Cameroon, Central African Republic, Chad, Djibouti, Gabon, and the Republic of the Congo.

Rwanda and Burundi are RHT but are considering switching to LHT (see "Potential future shifts" section below).

=== Americas ===
==== United States ====
In the late 18th century, right-hand traffic started to be introduced in the United States based on teamsters' use of large freight wagons pulled by several pairs of horses and without a driver's seat; the (typically right-handed) postilion held his whip in his right hand and thus sat on the left rear horse, and therefore preferred other wagons passing on the left so that he would have a clear view of other vehicles. The first keep-right law for driving in the United States was passed in 1792 and applied to the Philadelphia and Lancaster Turnpike. Massachusetts formalized RHT in 1821. However, the National Road was LHT until 1850, "long after the rest of the country had settled on the keep-right convention". Today the United States is RHT except the United States Virgin Islands, which is LHT like many neighbouring islands.

Some special-purpose vehicles in the United States, like certain postal service trucks, garbage trucks, and parking-enforcement vehicles, are built with the driver's seat on the right for safer and easier access to the curb. A common example is the Grumman LLV, which is used nationwide by the US Postal Service and by Canada Post.

==== Other countries in the Americas ====
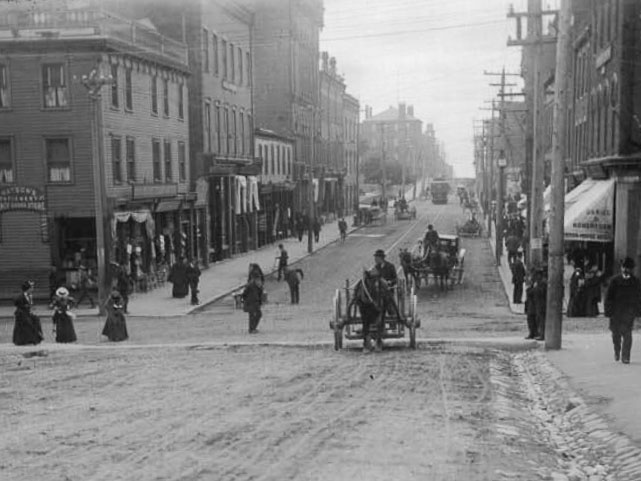
Parts of Canada were LHT until the 1920s, shown here in Saint John, New Brunswick, 1898.

In Canada, the provinces of Quebec and Ontario were always RHT because they were created out of the former French colony of New France. The province of British Columbia changed to RHT in stages from 1920 to 1923, New Brunswick, Nova Scotia, and Prince Edward Island in 1922, 1923, and 1924 respectively, and the Dominion of Newfoundland (part of Canada since 1949) in 1947.

In the West Indies, colonies and territories drive on the same side as their parent countries, except for the United States Virgin Islands. Many of the island nations are former British colonies and drive on the left, including Jamaica, Antigua and Barbuda, Barbados, Dominica, Grenada, Saint Kitts and Nevis, Saint Lucia, Saint Vincent and the Grenadines, Trinidad and Tobago, and The Bahamas. However, most vehicles in The Bahamas, Cayman Islands, Turks and Caicos Islands and both the British Virgin Islands, and the United States Virgin Islands are LHD due to their being imported from the United States.

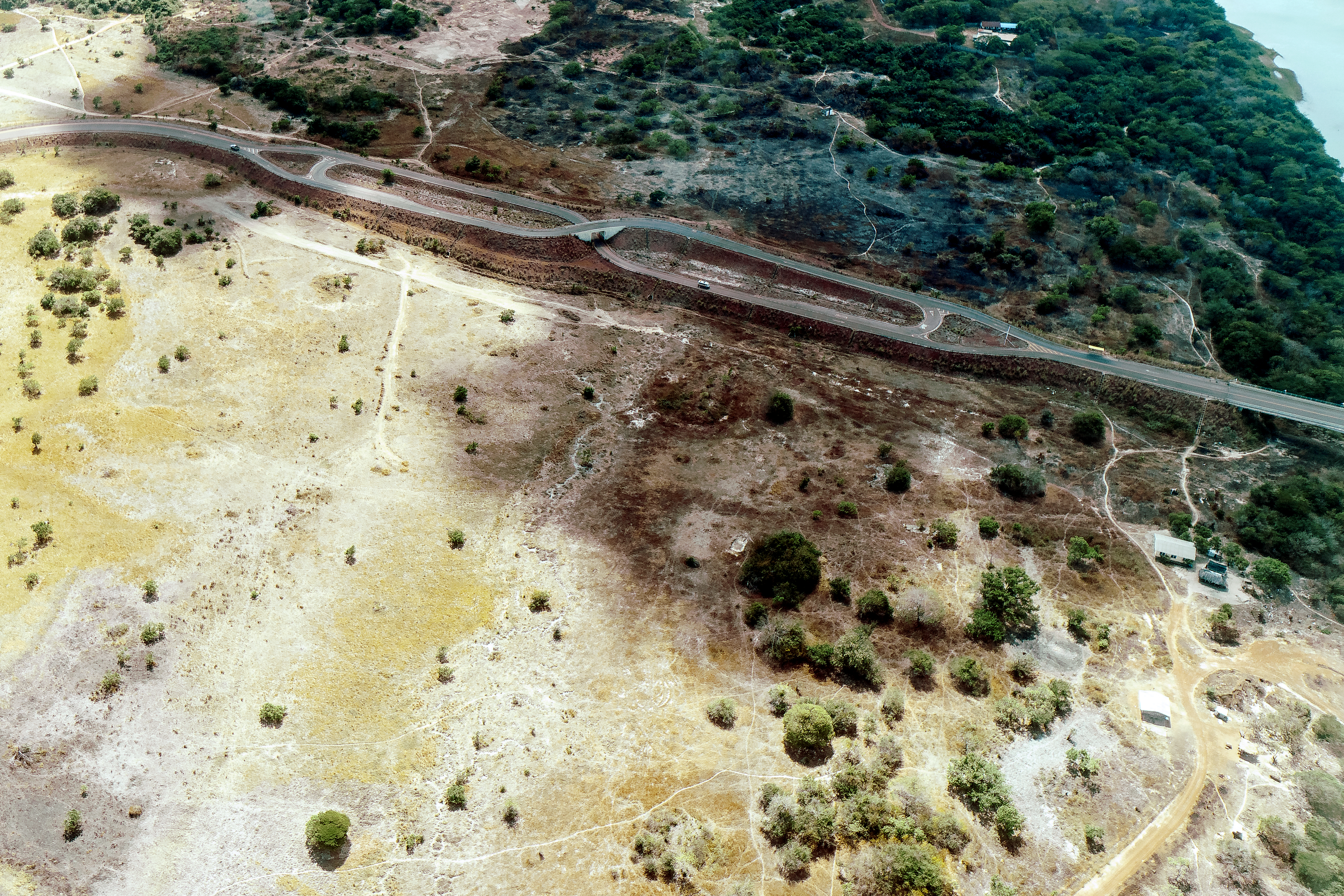
Crossover bridge near the Takutu River Bridge between Guyana (LHT) and Brazil (RHT)

Brazil, a Portuguese colony until the early 19th century, had in the 19th and the early 20th century mixed rules, with some regions still on LHT, switching these remaining regions to RHT in 1928, the same year Portugal switched sides. Other Central and South American countries that later switched from LHT to RHT include Argentina, Panama, Paraguay, and Uruguay.

Suriname and its neighbour Guyana are the only two remaining LHT countries in South America.

=== Asia ===
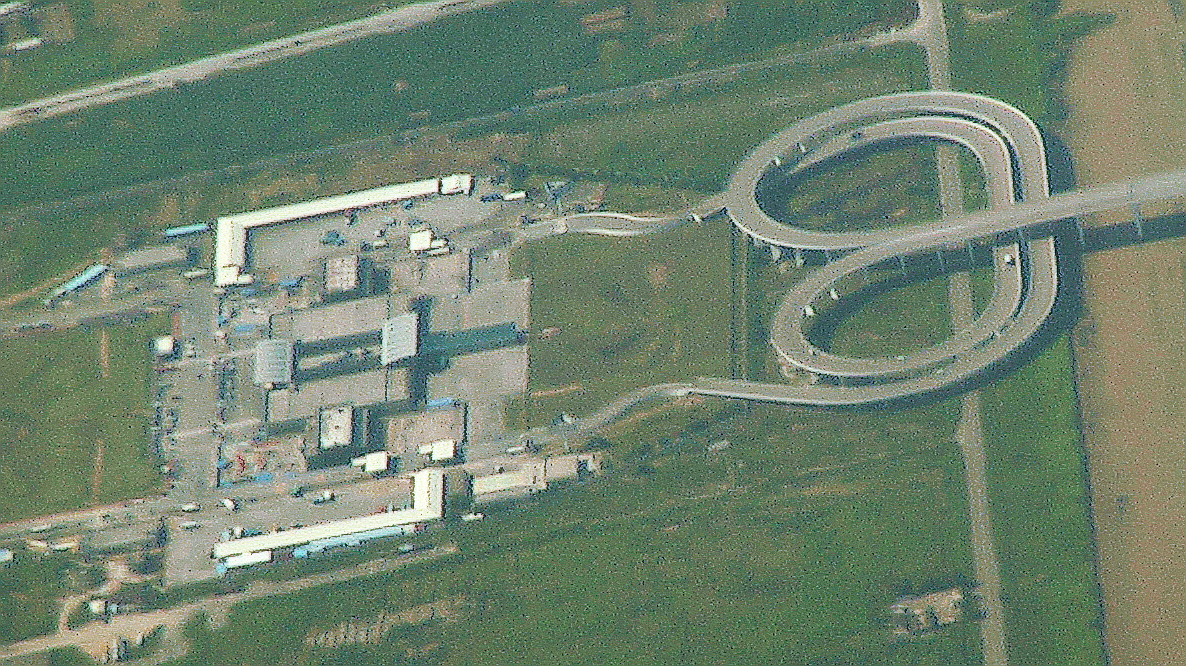
The Lotus Bridge exchanges between LHT in Macau and RHT in mainland China.

LHT was introduced by the UK in British India (now India, Pakistan, Myanmar, and Bangladesh), British Malaya and British Borneo (now Malaysia, Brunei and Singapore), as well as British Hong Kong. These countries, except Myanmar, are still LHT, as well as neighbouring countries Bhutan and Nepal. Myanmar switched to RHT in 1970, although much of its infrastructure is still geared to LHT as its neighbours India, Bangladesh and Thailand use LHT. Most cars are used RHD vehicles imported from Japan. Afghanistan was LHT until the 1950s, in line with Pakistan (former part of British India).

Although Portuguese Timor (present-day East Timor), which shares the island of Timor with Indonesia, who is LHT, switched to RHT with Portugal in 1928, it switched back to LHT in 1976 during the Indonesian occupation of East Timor.

In the 1930s, parts of China such as the Shanghai International Settlement, Canton and Japanese-occupied northeast China used LHT. However, in 1946 the Republic of China made RHT mandatory in China (including Taiwan). Taiwan was LHT under Japanese colonization from 1895–1945. Portuguese Macau (present-day Macau) remained LHT, along with British Hong Kong, despite being transferred to China in 1999 and 1997 respectively.

Both North Korea and South Korea use RHT since 1946, after liberation from Japanese colonialization.

The Philippines was mostly LHT during its Spanish and American colonial periods, as well as during the Commonwealth era. During the Japanese occupation, the Philippines remained LHT, as was required by the Japanese; but during the Battle of Manila, the liberating American forces drove their tanks to the right for easier facilitation of movement. RHT was formalized in 1945 through a decree by president Sergio Osmeña. Even though RHT was formalized, RHD vehicles such as public buses were still imported into the Philippines until a law passed banning the importation of RHD vehicles except in special cases. These RHD vehicles are required to be converted to LHD.

Japan was never part of the British Empire, but its traffic also drives on the left. Although this practice goes back to the Edo period (1603–1868), it was not until 1872 – the year Japan's first railway was introduced, built with technical aid from the British – that this unwritten rule received official acknowledgment. Gradually, a massive network of railways and tram tracks was built, with all railway vehicles driven on the left-hand side. However, it took another half-century, until 1924, until left-hand traffic was legally mandated. Post-World War II Okinawa was ruled by the United States Civil Administration of the Ryukyu Islands until 1972, and was RHT until 6 a.m. the morning of 30 July 1978, when it switched back to LHT. The conversion operation was known as 730 (Nana-San-Maru, which refers to the date of the changeover). Okinawa is one of only a few places to have changed from RHT to LHT in the late 20th century. While Japan drives on the left and most Japanese vehicles are RHD, imported vehicles (e.g. BMW, Mercedes-Benz, Porsche) are generally bought as LHD since LHD cars are considered to be status symbols.

Vietnam became RHT as part of French Indochina, as did Laos and Cambodia. In Cambodia, RHD cars, many of which were smuggled from Thailand, were banned in 2001, even though they accounted for 80% of vehicles in the country.

=== Europe ===
In a study of the ancient traffic system of Pompeii, Eric Poehler was able to show that drivers of carts drove in the middle of the road whenever possible. This was the case even on roads wide enough for two lanes. The wear marks on the kerbstones, however, prove that when there were two lanes of traffic, and the volume of traffic made it necessary to divide the lanes, the drivers always drove on the right-hand side. These considerations can also be demonstrated in the archaeological findings of other cities in the Roman Empire.

One of the first references in England to requiring traffic direction was an order by the London Court of Aldermen in 1669, requiring a man to be posted on London Bridge to ensure that "all cartes going to keep on the one side and all cartes coming to keep on the other side". It was later legislated as the London Bridge Act 1756 (29 Geo. 2 c. 40), which required that "all carriages passing over the said bridge from London shall go on the east side thereof" – those going south to remain on the east, i.e. the left-hand side by direction of travel. This may represent the first statutory requirement for LHT.

In the Kingdom of Ireland, a law of 1793 (33 Geo. 3. c. 56 (I)) provided a ten-shilling fine to anyone not driving or riding on the left side of the road within the county of the city of Dublin, and required the local road overseers to erect written or printed notices informing road users of the law. The Road in Down and Antrim Act 1798 (38 Geo. 3. c. 28 (I)) required drivers on the road from Dublin to Donaghadee to keep to the left. This time, the punishment was ten shillings if the offender was not the owner of the vehicle, or one Irish pound (twenty shillings) if he/she was. The Grand Juries (Ireland) Act 1836 (6 & 7 Will. 4 c. 116) mandated LHT for the whole country, violators to be fined up to five shillings and imprisoned in default for up to one month.

An oft-repeated story is that Napoleon changed the custom from LHT to RHT in France and the countries he conquered after the French Revolution. Scholars who have looked for documentary evidence of this story have found none, and contemporary sources have not surfaced, as of 1999. In 1827, twelve years after Napoleon's reign, Edward Planta wrote that, in Paris, "The coachmen have no established rule by which they drive on the right or left of the road, but they cross and jostle one another without ceremony."

Rotterdam had no fixed rules until 1917, although the rest of the Netherlands was RHT. In May 1917 the police in Rotterdam ended traffic chaos by enforcing right hand traffic.

In Russia, in 1709, the Danish envoy under Tsar Peter the Great noted the widespread custom for traffic in Russia to pass on the right, but it was only in 1752 that Empress Elizabeth officially issued an edict for traffic to keep to the right.

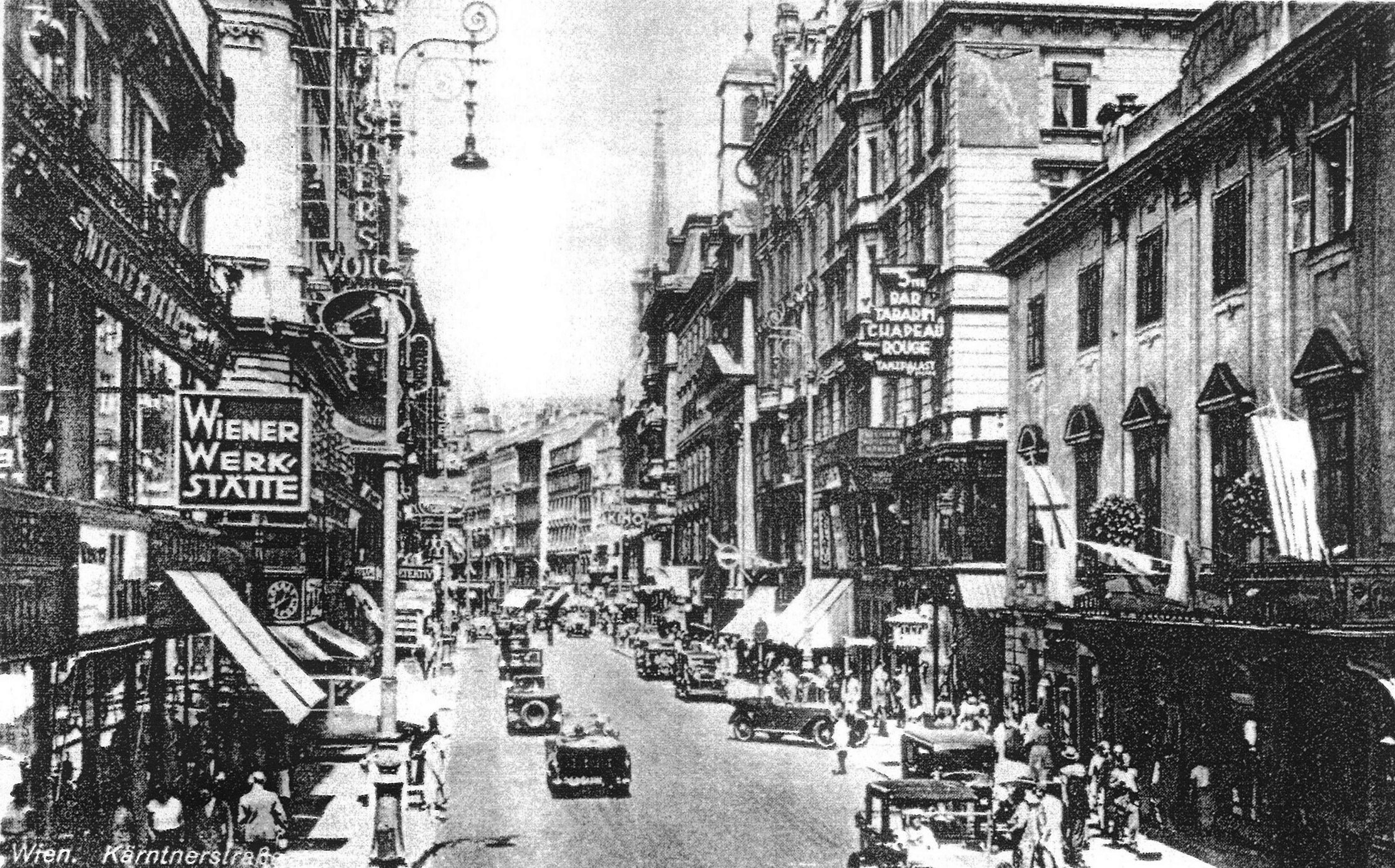
Left-hand traffic in Vienna, Austria, c. 1930

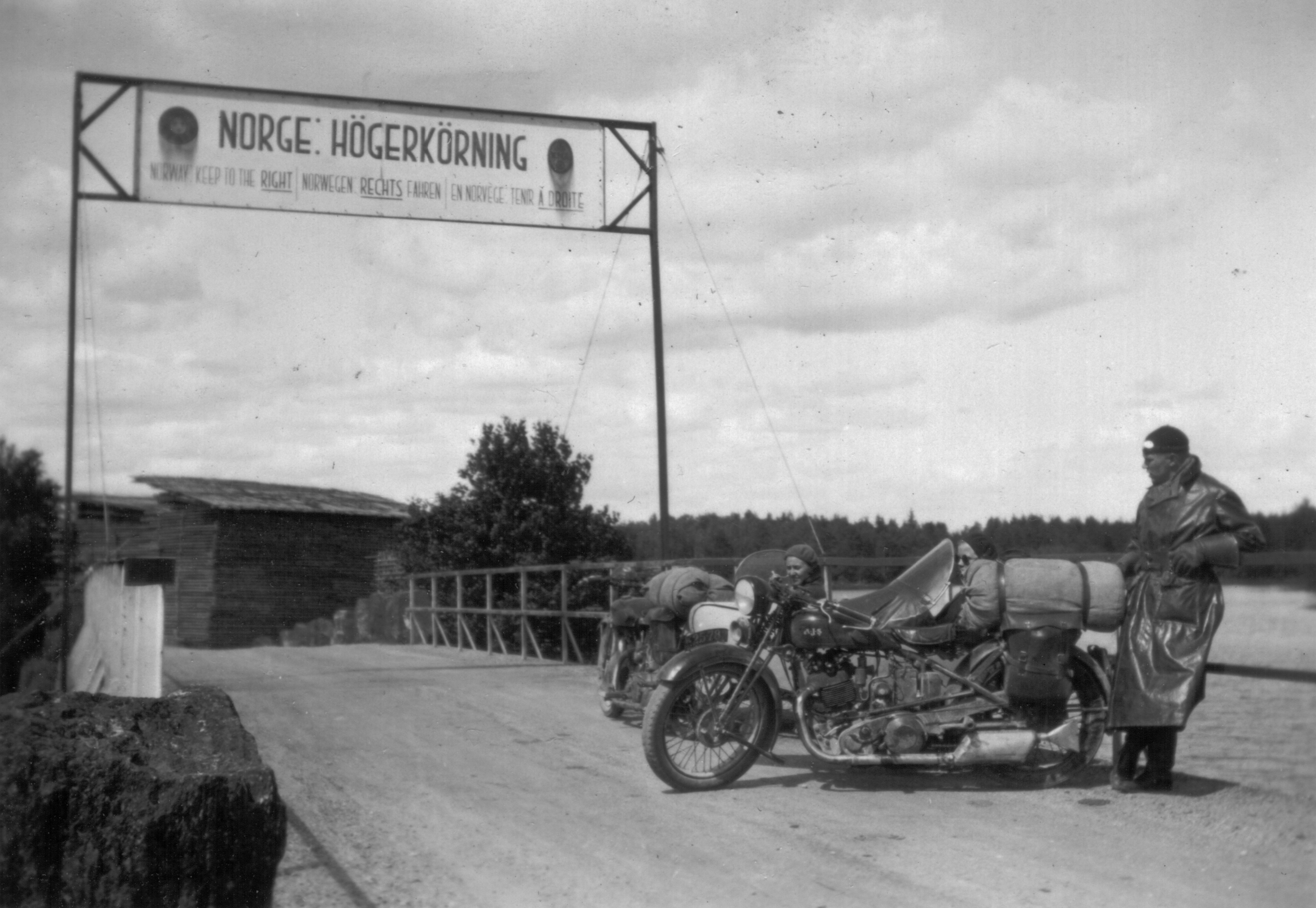
Border sign showing change of traffic direction between Sweden and Norway in 1934

After the Austro-Hungarian Empire broke up, the resulting countries gradually changed to RHT. In Austria, Vorarlberg switched in 1921, North Tyrol in 1930, Carinthia and East Tyrol in 1935, and the rest of the country in 1938. In Romania, Transylvania, the Banat and Bukovina were LHT until 1919, while Wallachia and Moldavia were already RHT. Partitions of Poland belonging to the German Empire and the Russian Empire were RHT, while the former Austrian Partition changed in the 1920s. Croatia-Slavonia switched on joining the Kingdom of Yugoslavia in 1918, although Istria and Dalmatia were already RHT. The switch in Czechoslovakia from LHT to RHT had been planned for 1939, but was accelerated by the start of the German occupation of Czechoslovakia that year.

In Italy, it had been decreed in 1901 that each province define its own traffic code, including the handedness of traffic, and the 1903 Baedeker guide reported that the rule of the road varied by region. For example, in Northern Italy, the provinces of Brescia, Como, Vicenza, and Ravenna were RHT while nearby provinces of Lecco, Verona, and Varese were LHT, as were the cities Milan, Turin, and Florence. In 1915, allied forces of World War I imposed LHT in areas of military operation, but this was revoked in 1918. Rome was reported by Goethe as LHT in the 1780s. Naples was also LHT although surrounding areas were often RHT. In cities, LHT was considered safer since pedestrians, accustomed to keeping right, could better see oncoming vehicular traffic. In 1923 Benito Mussolini decreed that all LHT areas would gradually transition to RHT.

Portugal switched to RHT in 1928.

Finland, formerly part of LHT Sweden, switched to RHT in 1858 as the Grand Duchy of Finland by Russian decree.

Spain switched to RHT in 1918, but not in the entire country. In Madrid people continued to drive on the left until 1924 when a national law forced drivers in Madrid switch to RHT. Madrid Metro still uses LHT.

Sweden switched to RHT in 1967, having been LHT from about 1734 despite having land borders with RHT countries Norway and Finland, and approximately 90% of cars being left-hand drive (LHD). A referendum in 1955 overwhelmingly rejected a change to RHT, but, a few years later, the government ordered it and it occurred on Sunday, 3 September 1967 at 5 am. The accident rate then dropped sharply, but soon rose to near its original level. The day was known as Högertrafikomläggningen, or Dagen H for short.

When Iceland switched to RHT the following year, it was known as Hægri dagurinn or H-dagurinn ("The H-Day"). Most passenger cars in Iceland were already LHD.

The United Kingdom is LHT, but two of its overseas territories, Gibraltar and the British Indian Ocean Territory, are RHT. In the late 1960s, the British Department for Transport considered switching to RHT, but declared it unsafe and too costly for such a built-up nation. Road building standards, for motorways in particular, allow asymmetrically designed road junctions, where merge and diverge lanes differ in length.

Today, four countries in Europe continue to use LHT, all island nations: the United Kingdom, Republic of Ireland (formerly part of the UK), Cyprus and Malta (both former British colonies).

=== Oceania ===
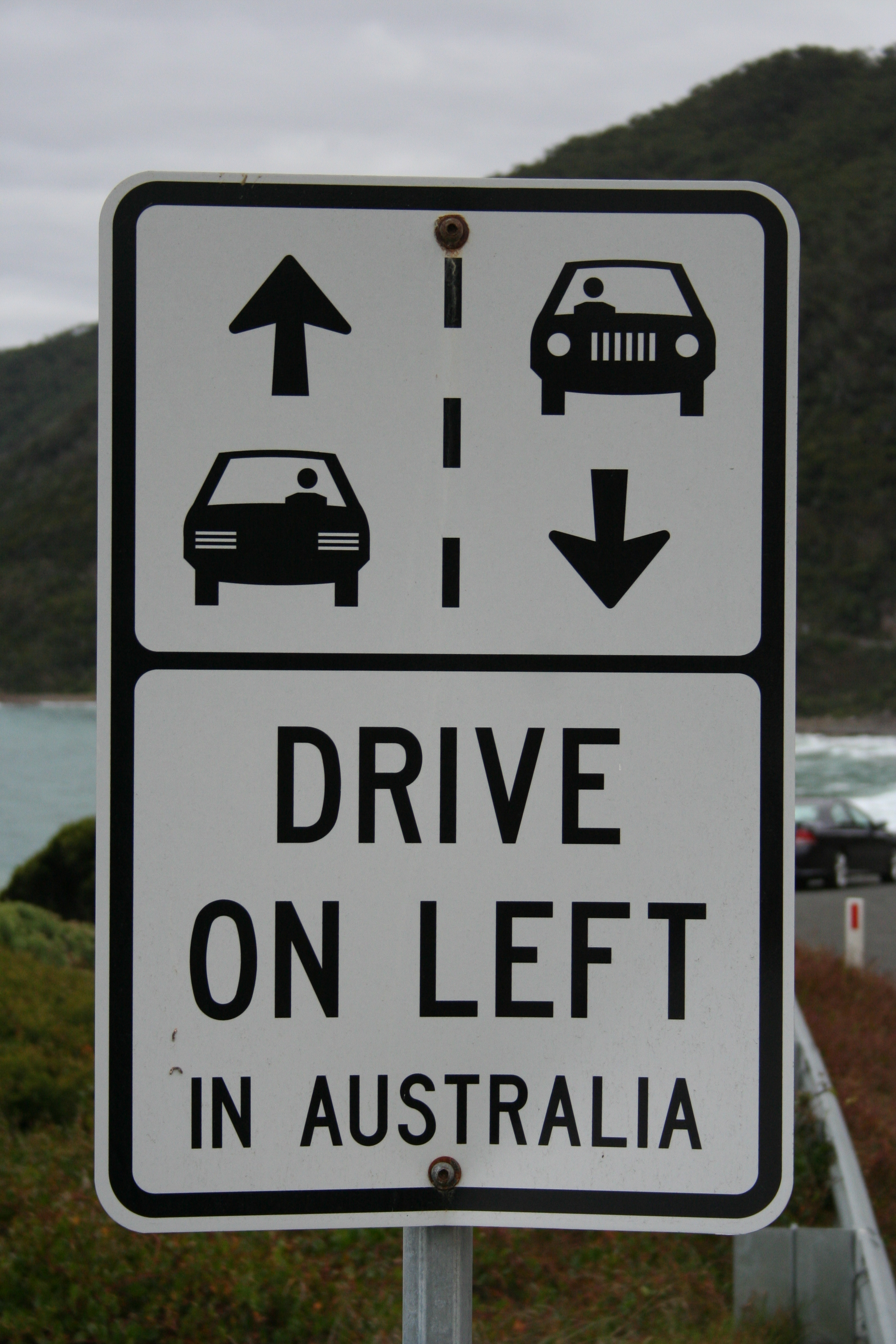
A sign on the Great Ocean Road, heavily visited by international tourists, reminding motorists to keep left in Australia

Many former British colonies in the region have always been LHT, including Australia, New Zealand, Fiji, Kiribati, Solomon Islands, Tonga, and Tuvalu; and nations that were previously administered by Australia: Nauru and Papua New Guinea.

==== New Zealand ====
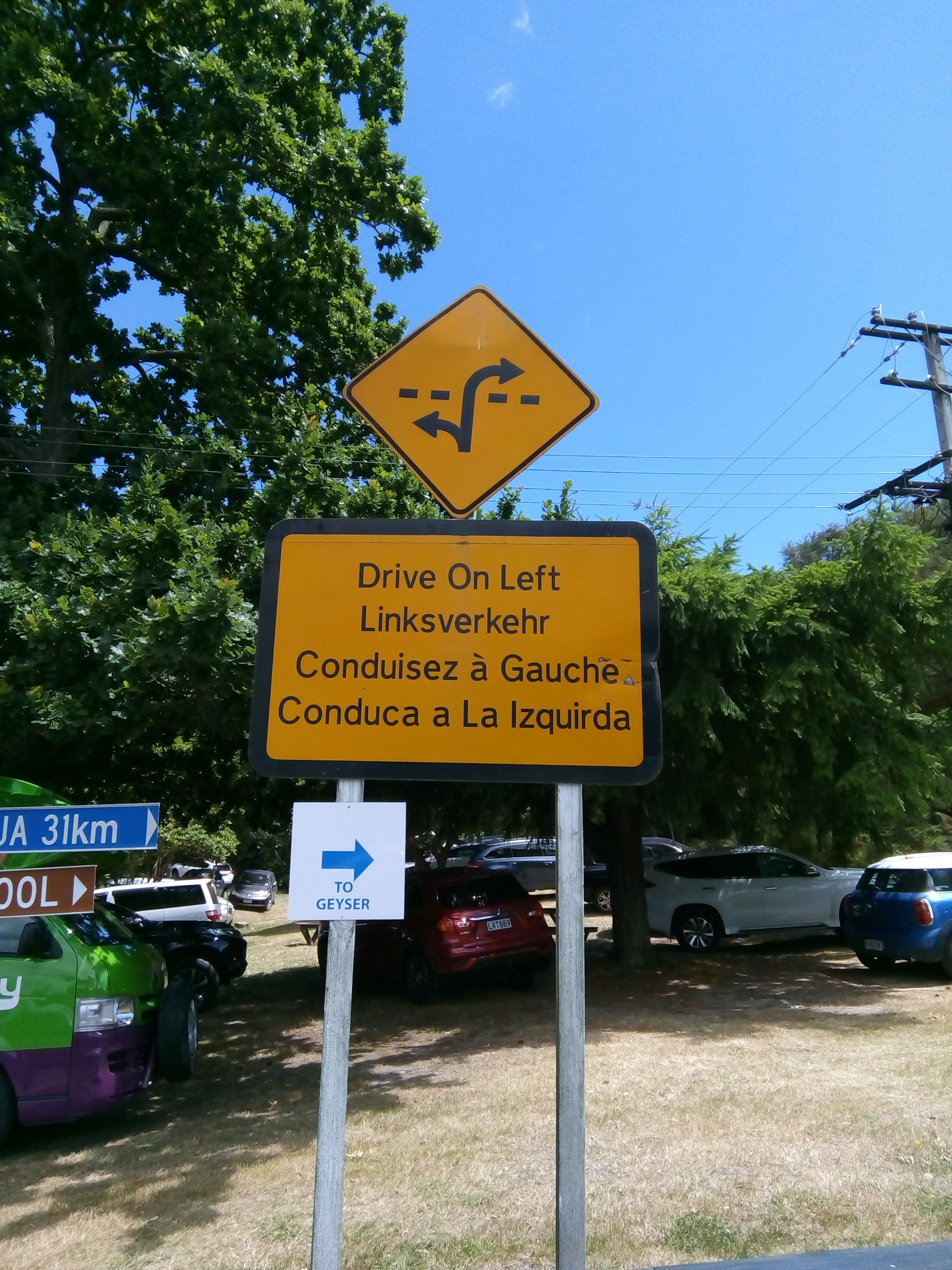
Multilingual sign at Waiotapu to remind tourists to drive on the left in New Zealand

Initially traffic was slow and very sparse, but, as early as 1856, a newspaper said, "The cart was near to the right-hand kerb. According to the rules of the road, it should have been on the left side. In turning sharp round a right-hand corner, a driver should keep away to the opposite side." That rule was codified when the first Highway Code was written in 1936.

==== Samoa ====
Samoa, a former German colony, had been RHT for more than a century, but switched to LHT in 2009, making it the first territory in almost 30 years to change sides. The move was legislated in 2008 to allow Samoans to use cheaper vehicles imported from Australia, New Zealand, or Japan, and to harmonise with other South Pacific nations. A political party, The People's Party, was formed by the group People Against Switching Sides (PASS) to protest against the change, with PASS launching a legal challenge; in April 2008 an estimated 18,000 people attended demonstrations against switching. The motor industry was also opposed, as 14,000 of Samoa's 18,000 vehicles were designed for RHT and the government refused to meet the cost of conversion. After months of preparation, the switch from right to left happened in an atmosphere of national celebration. There were no reported incidents. At 05:50 local time, Monday 7 September, a radio announcement halted traffic, and an announcement at 6:00 ordered traffic to switch to LHT. The change coincided with more restrictive enforcement of speeding and seat-belt laws. That day and the following were declared public holidays, to reduce traffic. The change included a three-day ban on alcohol sales, while police mounted dozens of checkpoints, warning drivers to drive slowly.

== Potential future shifts ==
Rwanda and Burundi, former Belgian colonies in Central Africa, are RHT but are considering switching to LHT like neighbouring members of the East African Community (EAC). A survey in 2009 found that 54% of Rwandans favoured the switch. Reasons cited were the perceived lower costs of RHD vehicles, easier maintenance and the political benefit of harmonizing traffic regulations with other EAC countries. The survey indicated that RHD cars were 16–49% cheaper than their LHD counterparts. In 2014, an internal report by consultants to the Ministry of Infrastructure recommended a switch to LHT. In 2015, the ban on RHD vehicles was lifted; RHD trucks from neighbouring countries cost $1,000 less than LHD models imported from Europe. Rwanda launched a study on switching to LHT, but has decided to stay RHT due to the high costs of switching infrastructure to LHT.

There is no country with a confirmed proposal or date where that country will switch the side of the road that they drive on.

== Changing sides at borders ==
Traffic switchover sign at the First Thai–Lao Friendship Bridge

Although many LHT jurisdictions are on islands, there are cases where vehicles may be driven from LHT across a border into a RHT area. Such borders are mostly located in Africa and southern Asia. The Vienna Convention on Road Traffic regulates the use of foreign registered vehicles in the 78 countries that have ratified it.

LHT Thailand has three RHT neighbours: Cambodia, Laos, and Myanmar. Most of its borders use a simple traffic light to do the switch, but there are also interchanges that enable the switch while keeping up a continuous flow of traffic.

There are six road border crossing points between Hong Kong and mainland China. In 2006, the daily average number of vehicle trips recorded at Lok Ma Chau was 31,100. The next largest is Man Kam To, where there is no changeover system and the border roads on the mainland side Wenjindu intersect as one-way streets with a main road.

The Takutu River Bridge (which links LHT Guyana and RHT Brazil) is the only border in the Americas where traffic changes sides.

== Road vehicle configurations ==
Legality of wrong-hand-drive vehicles by country Usage illegal Usage legal, but registration illegal or unknown Registration illegal for normal vehicles, with exceptions for special (e.g. diplomatic) vehicles Registration and usage legal No data

=== Steering wheel position ===
In RHT jurisdictions, vehicles are typically configured as left-hand drive (LHD), with the steering wheel on the left side of the passenger compartment. In LHT jurisdictions, the reverse is true as the right-hand drive (RHD) configuration. In most jurisdictions, the position of the steering wheel is not regulated, or explicitly permitted to be anywhere. The driver's side, the side closer to the centre of the road, is sometimes called the offside, while the passenger side, the side closer to the side of the road, is sometimes called the nearside.

Most windscreen wipers are preferentially designed to better clean the driver's side of the windscreen and thus have a longer wiper blade on the driver's side and wipe up from the passenger side to the driver's side. Thus on LHD configurations, they wipe up from right to left, viewed from inside the vehicle, and do the opposite on RHD vehicles.

In both LHD and RHD vehicles, gear shifters are in the same position, and the shift patterns are not reversed.

Historically there was less consistency in the relationship of the position of the driver to the handedness of traffic. Most American cars produced before 1910 were RHD. In 1908, Henry Ford standardised the Model T as LHD in RHT America, arguing that with RHD and RHT, the passenger was obliged to "get out on the street side and walk around the car" and that with steering from the left, the driver "is able to see even the wheels of the other car and easily avoids danger." By 1915, other manufacturers followed Ford's lead, due to the popularity of the Model T.

In specialised cases, the driver will sit on the nearside, or kerbside. Examples include:

- Where the driver needs a good view of the nearside, e.g. street sweepers, or vehicles driven along unstable road edges. Similarly in mountainous areas the driver may be seated opposite side so that they have a better view of the road edge which may fall away for very many metres into the valley below. Swiss Postbuses in mountainous areas are a well known example.
- Where it is more convenient for the driver to be on the nearside, e.g. delivery vehicles. The Grumman LLV postal delivery truck is widely used with RHD configurations in RHT North America. Some Unimogs are designed to switch between LHD and RHD to permit operators to work on the more convenient side of the truck.

Generally, the convention is to mount a motorcycle on the left, and kickstands are usually on the left which makes it more convenient to mount on the safer kerbside as is the case in LHT. Some jurisdictions prohibit fitting a sidecar to a motorcycle's offside.

In 2020, there were 160 LHD heavy goods vehicles in the UK involved in accidents (5%) for a total of 3,175 accidents, killing 215 people (5%) for a total of 4271.

=== Dashboard configuration ===
Some manufacturers primarily produce left-hand drive vehicles, due to the larger or nearer market for such vehicles. For such models supplied to left-hand traffic markets, in the right-hand drive configuration, the manufacturer may reuse the same dashboard configuration as is used in the left-hand drive models, with the steering column and pedals moved to the right-hand side. Oft-used controls (such as audio volume and fan controls) that were placed near the left-hand driver for ease of access, are now situated on the far side of the center console for the right-hand driver. This may make them more difficult to reach quickly or without looking away from the road ahead.

In some cases, the manufacturer's dashboard design incorporates blanks and modular components, which permits the controls and underlying electronics to be rearranged to suit the right-hand drive model. This may be done in the factory, after import, or as an after-market modification.

=== Headlamps and other lighting equipment ===
Bird's-eye view of low beam light pattern for RH traffic, with long seeing range on the right and short cutoff on the left so oncoming drivers are not dazzled

Most low-beam headlamps produce an asymmetrical light suitable for use on only one side of the road. Low beam headlamps in LHT jurisdictions throw most of their light forward-leftward; those for RHT throw most of their light forward-rightward, thus illuminating obstacles and road signs while minimising glare for oncoming traffic.

In Europe, headlamps approved for use on one side of the road must be adaptable to produce adequate illumination with controlled glare for temporarily driving on the other side of the road,. This may be achieved by affixing masking strips or prismatic lenses to a part of the lens or by moving all or part of the headlamp optic so all or part of the beam is shifted or the asymmetrical portion is occluded. Some varieties of the projector-type headlamp can be fully adjusted to produce a proper LHT or RHT beam by shifting a lever or other movable element in or on the lamp assembly. Some vehicles adjust the headlamps automatically when the car's GPS detects that the vehicle has moved from LHT to RHT and vice versa.

==== Rear fog lamps ====
In Europe since the early 1980s, cars must be equipped with one or two red rear fog lamps. A single rear fog lamp must be located between the vehicle's longitudinal centreline and the outer extent of the driver's side of the vehicle.

=== Crash testing differences ===
ANCAP reports that some RHD cars imported to Australia did not perform as well on crash tests as the LHD versions, although the cause is unknown, and may be due to differences in testing methodology.

== Rail traffic ==
=== National rail ===
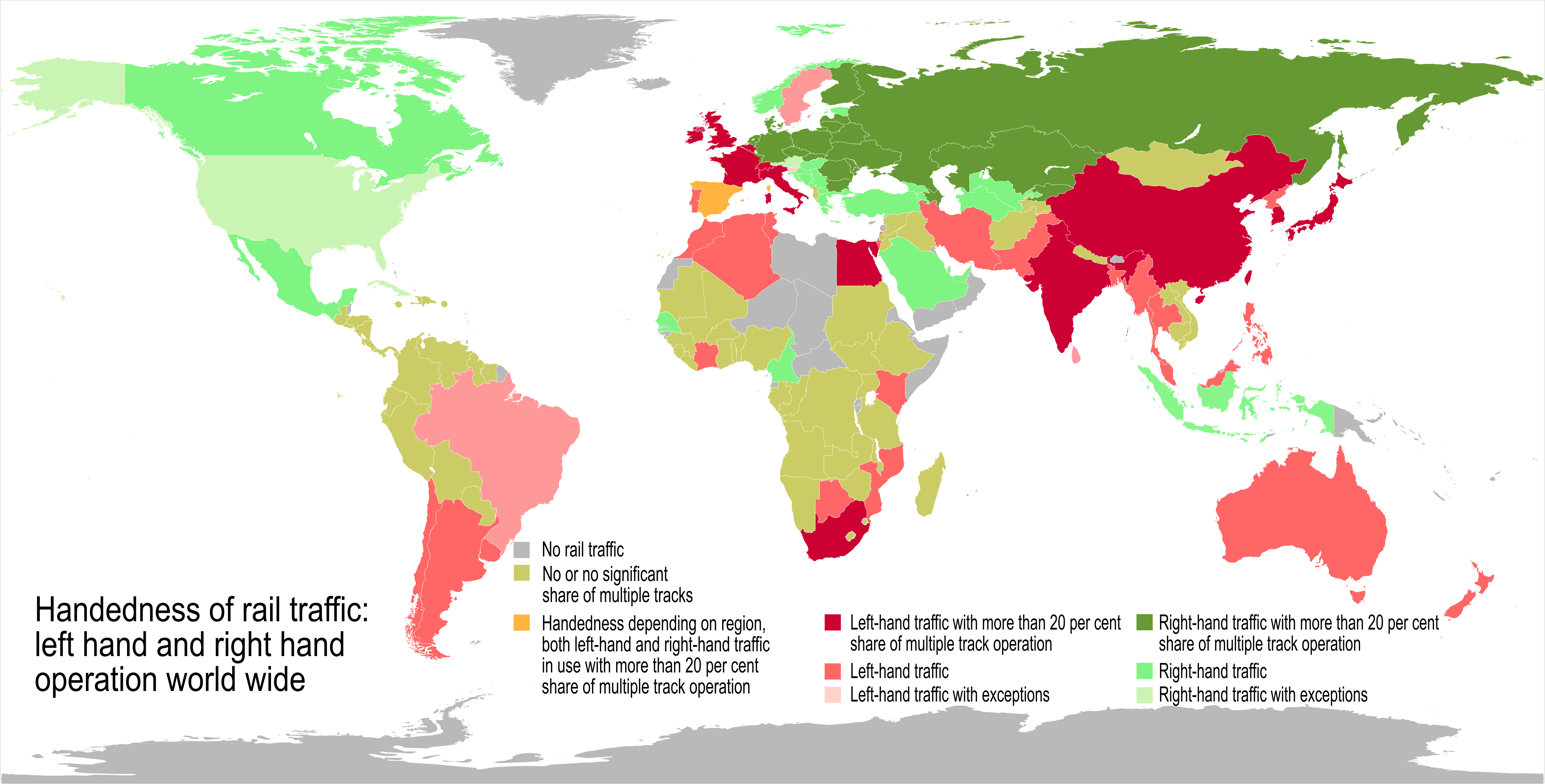
Handedness of rail traffic worldwide

In most countries, rail traffic travels on the same side as road traffic. However, there are many instances of railways built using LHT British technology, which remained LHT despite their nations' road traffic becoming RHT. The main reason is that the switch of rail traffic's direction is more difficult and expensive than the switching sides of a roads. Examples include: Argentina, Belgium, Bolivia, Brazil, Cambodia, China, Egypt, France, Iraq, Israel, Italy, Laos, Monaco, Morocco, Myanmar, Nigeria, Peru, Portugal, Senegal, Slovenia, Sweden, Switzerland, Taiwan, Tunisia, Uruguay and Venezuela. In North America, multi-track rail lines with centralized traffic control are typically signalled to allow operation on any track in both directions, and the side of operation will vary based on the railroad's specific operational requirements.

Handedness of rail traffic in a country may differ due to historical or other reasons. For example, in Spain the broad-gauge lines that belong to the historic Compañía de los Caminos de Hierro del Norte de España , like León–A Coruña route and several branches run on the left, while the rest of the lines run on the right. Sweden, which had LHT till 1967, did not switch the direction of its trains, but the line from the north of Malmö, which leads to the border with Denmark and further south uses RHT. Russian railways are RHT, but a small number of routes like Moscow – Ryazan line run on the left. France is mainly LHT for trains except for the classic lines in Alsace–Lorraine, which were converted from LHT to RHT under German administration from 1870 to 1918. In Austria, the Semmering Railway, which had LHT on the line, was converted to the RHT, except the Bruck an der Mur – Graz section. Switzerland has LHT for the trains, except for the German border areas. In Finland, several lines of Helsinki commuter rail, like the line to Helsinki Airport uses LHT, while the metro and the rest of lines uses RHT. Slovenia is LHT for trains but Zidani Most – Dobova runs on the right because of the connection with RHT Croatia.

Philippines railways are one of the few instances nowadays that had switched sides. It originally ran one the left until 2010, but switched to the RHT to match the roads in the country, which also are RHT.

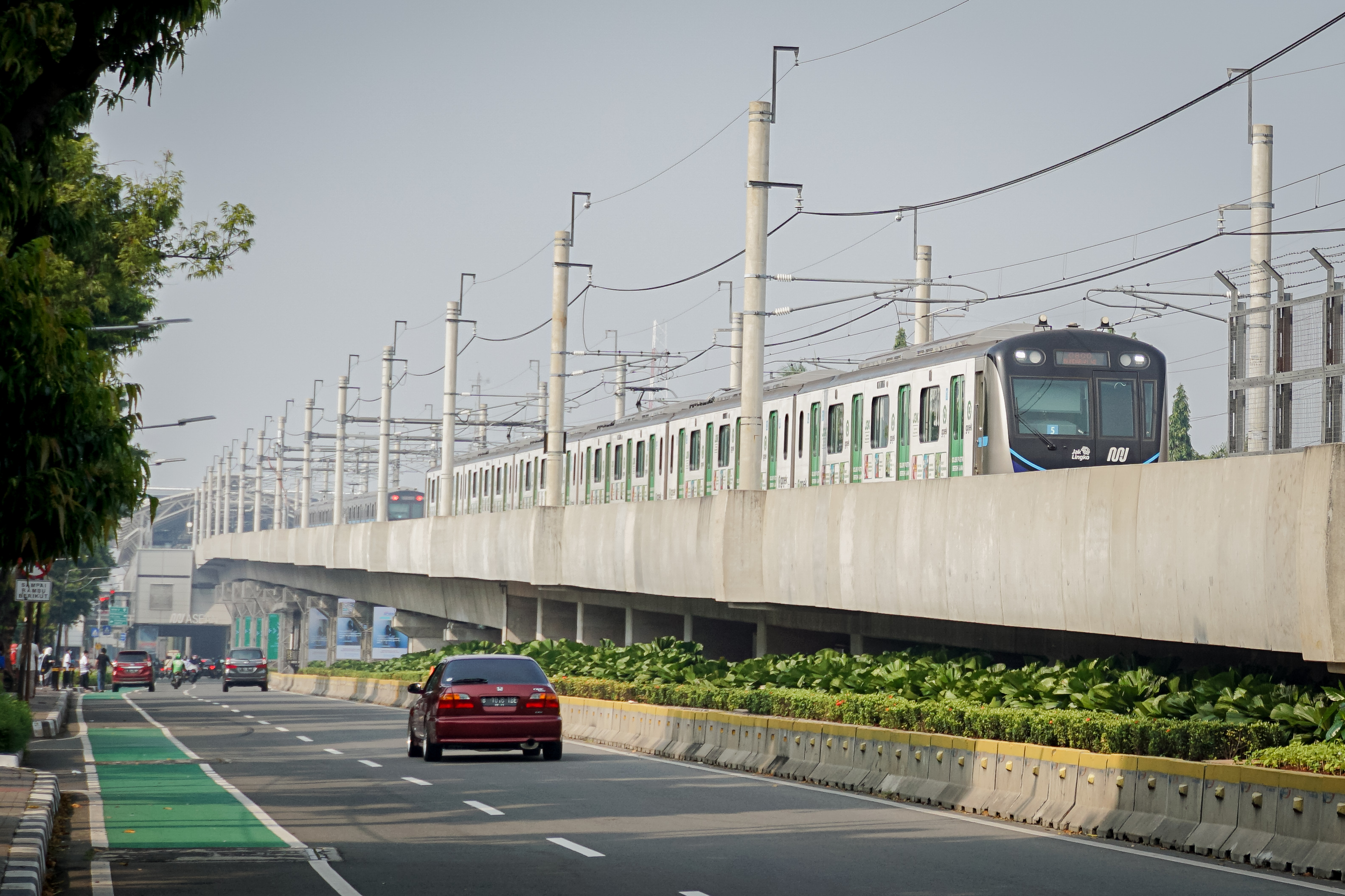
Jakarta MRT is a train system that uses right-hand traffic, in a country (Indonesia) where roads use left-hand traffic.

Indonesia is the only country in the world which has RHT for rails (even for newer rail systems such as the LRT and the MRT systems) and LHT for roads.

=== Metro/tram/light rail ===
Metro and light rail sides of operation vary and might not match railways or roads in their country. Some systems where the metro matches the side of the national rail network but not the roads include those in Bilbao, Buenos Aires, Cairo (except for the Monorail), Catania, Jakarta, Lisbon, Lyon, Naples, and Rome. A small number of cities, including Madrid and Stockholm, originally ran on the same side as road traffic when the systems opened in 1919 and 1950 respectively, but had road traffic change in 1924 and 1967 respectively. Conversely, metros in Brazil (except in Belo Horizonte and Porto Alegre), France (except for the aforementioned Lyon), South Korea, and mainland China run on the right just like roads, while mainline trains run on the left.

A small number of systems have situational reasons to differ from the norm. Line D-3 of Moscow Central Diameters uses left-hand traffic as the part of abovementioned Ryazan direction between Moscow and Ryazan, except a portion from Firsanovskaya to Petrovsko-Razumovskaya. On the MTR in Hong Kong, the section originally known as the Ma On Shan line (now part of the Tuen Ma line) runs on the right to make interchanging with the East Rail line easier, while the rest of the system runs on the left. On the Seoul Metropolitan Subway, lines that integrate with Korail (except Line 3, which is disconnected from the rest of the network) run on the left, while the lines that are not (except for the Shinbundang Line) run on the right. In Nizhny Novgorod, Line 2 runs on the left due to the track layout when it first opened as a branch of Line 1. In Lima, Line 1 runs entirely on the left, while Line 2 runs entirely on the right. In Barcelona, a section of Line 2 from Tetuan to Paral•lel runs on the left, while the rest of the system runs on the right.

Metro Line M1 in Budapest is the only metro line to have switched sides. It originally ran on the left but switched to right-hand running during the line's reconstruction around 1973.

The former Rochester subway, which operated from 1927 to 1956, ran on the left to let unidirectional vehicles with doors on the right use stations with island platforms. The same situation with the underground parts of first phases of Volgograd and Kryvyi Rih Metrotrams, they both use LHT on those parts.

Because trams frequently operate on roads, they generally operate on the same side as other road traffic, but there are some exceptions. Apart from the abovementioned Volgograd and Krivyi Rih, they are for example, the part of Gothenburg tram from Hjallbo to Angered and Alvik — Alléparken section of Nockebybanan and some parts of Lidingöbanan of Stockholm tram network, which use LHT while the rest of the systems run on the right.

== Boat traffic ==
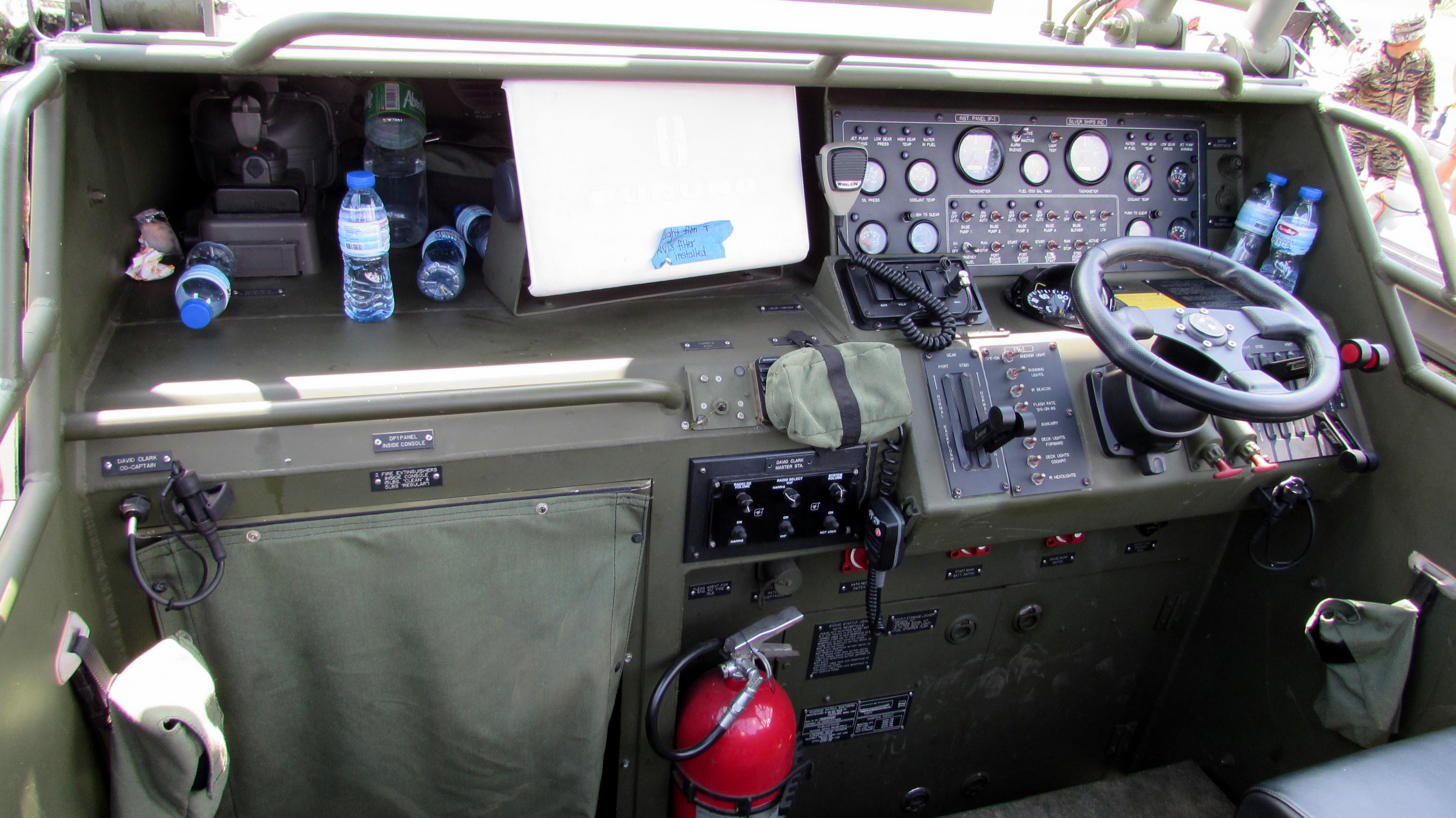
Helmsman's station on a Philippine Marine Corps patrol boat

Boats are traditionally piloted from starboard (the right-hand side) to facilitate priority to the right. According to the International Regulations for Preventing Collisions at Sea, water traffic is effectively RHT: a vessel proceeding along a narrow channel must keep to starboard, and when two power-driven vessels are meeting head-on both must alter course to starboard also.

Typically, especially for larger vessels, a radio call will be made between two vessels, or with a Vessel Traffic Service (VTS) to co-ordinate if the vessels will pass "green-to-green" or "red-to-red". Marine traffic uses a system of green lighting for the starboard (right-hand) side and red for port (left-hand) side: to pass "green-to-green" the green (starboard, right-hand) side of the vessels will pass each other, essentially being left-hand traffic. Similarly, passing "red-to-red" means the red (port, left-hand) side of the vessels will pass each other, forming right-hand traffic.

In busy waterways, directional shipping lanes may be set up to facilitate handedness of traffic. For example, the Strait of Dover (Pas-de-Calais) on the English Channel uses RHT with North Sea-bound vessels following the French coast and Atlantic-bound vessels following the English coast.

== Aircraft traffic ==
For aircraft, the US Federal Aviation Regulations suggest RHT principles, both in the air and on water, and in aircraft with side-by-side cockpit seating, the pilot-in-command (or more senior flight officer) traditionally occupies the left seat. However, helicopter practice tends to favour the right hand seat for the pilot-in-command, particularly when flying solo.

== Worldwide distribution by country ==
Of the 195 countries currently recognised by the United Nations, 141 use RHT and 54 use LHT on roads in general.

A country and its territories and dependencies are counted as one. Whichever directionality is listed first is the type that is used in general in the traffic category.

Country		Road traffic	Date of switch	Notes, exceptions
Afghanistan		RHT	1955	Kabul adopted RHT in 1955.
Albania		RHT	1926	
Algeria		RHT	1900	Part of France until 1962.
Andorra		RHT	1724	Landlocked between France and Spain.
Angola		RHT	1928	Portuguese colony until 1975.
Antigua and Barbuda		LHT		These Caribbean islands were a British colony until 1958.
Argentina		RHT	10 June 1945	The anniversary on 10 June is still observed each year as Día de la Seguridad Vial (road safety day).
Armenia		RHT	1923	
Australia		LHT		British colonies before 1901. Includes Australian external territories.
Austria		RHT	1921–38	Originally LHT, like most of Austria-Hungary, but switched sides after the annexation of Austria by Nazi Germany.
Azerbaijan		RHT	1966	
Bahamas		LHT		British colony before 1973. Caribbean island. Most passenger vehicles are LHD due to them being imported from the United States.
Bahrain		RHT	November 1967	Former British protectorate. Switched to the same side as its neighbours. An island nation, linked by road to the Arabian mainland since 1986.
Bangladesh		LHT		Part of Pakistan before 1971, which was part of British India before 1947.
Barbados		LHT		This Atlantic island state was a British colony before 1966.
Belarus		RHT	1966	
Belgium		RHT	1899	
Belize		RHT	October 1, 1961	British colony before 1981. Switched to same side as neighbours.
Benin		RHT		Part of French West Africa before 1960.
Bhutan		LHT		Under British protection before 1949.
Bolivia		RHT		Yungas Road is LHT.
Bosnia and Herzegovina		RHT	1918	Switched sides after the collapse of Austria-Hungary.
Botswana		LHT		British colony before 1966.
Brazil		RHT	1928	Portuguese colony before 1822.
Brunei		LHT		British protection until 1984.
Bulgaria		RHT		
Burkina Faso		RHT		Part of French West Africa before 1958.
Burundi		RHT		Belgian colony before 1962. Considering switching to LHT.
Cambodia		RHT		French protectorate before 1953.
Cameroon		RHT	1961	
Canada	Alberta	RHT		
Canada	British Columbia	RHT	1920–1922	Interior changed 15 July 1920, Vancouver and the coastal area 1 January 1922
Canada	Manitoba	RHT		
Canada	New Brunswick	RHT	1 December 1922	
Canada	Newfoundland and Labrador	RHT	2 January 1947	Was a British Dominion until 1949.
Canada	Northwest Territories	RHT		
Canada	Nova Scotia	RHT	15 April 1923	
Canada	Nunavut	RHT		
Canada	Ontario	RHT		
Canada	Prince Edward Island	RHT	1 May 1924	
Canada	Quebec	RHT		
Canada	Saskatchewan	RHT		
Canada	Yukon	RHT		
Cape Verde		RHT	1928	Portuguese colony before 1975.
Central African Republic		RHT		French colonies before 1960.
Chad		RHT		French colonies before 1960.
Chile		RHT		
China	Mainland	RHT	January 1, 1946	Parts of China were LHT in the 1930s.
China	Hong Kong	LHT		Hong Kong was a British colony from 1841 to 1941 and from 1945 to 1997, when the dependent territory was transferred to China.
China	Macau	LHT		Macau was under Portuguese rule until 1999, when the dependent territory was transferred to China.
Colombia		RHT		
Comoros		RHT		French colony before 1975.
Congo		RHT		French colony before 1960.
DR Congo		RHT		Belgian colony before 1960. RHD vehicles are common, especially in the southeast.
Costa Rica		RHT		
Croatia		RHT	1926	Was then part of the Kingdom of Serbs, Croats and Slovenes.
Cuba		RHT		
Cyprus		LHT		Under UK administration before 1960. Island nation. De facto divided between the Republic of Cyprus, the Turkish Republic of Northern Cyprus, the UN buffer zone and the British base areas of Akrotiri and Dhekelia. All are LHT.
Czech Republic		RHT	1939	Switched during the German occupation of Czechoslovakia.
Denmark		RHT	1793	Includes the Faroe Islands and Greenland. Danish West Indies were LHT, and continue to be LHT as United States Virgin Islands after US purchase in 1917.
Djibouti		RHT		French colony before 1977.
Dominica		LHT		British colony before 1978. Caribbean island.
Dominican Republic		RHT		Under Spanish control until 1821 and again from 1861 to 1865.
Ecuador		RHT		
Egypt		RHT		
El Salvador		RHT		
Equatorial Guinea		RHT		Spanish colony before 1968.
Eritrea		RHT	8 June 1964	Italian colony before 1942.
Estonia		RHT		
Eswatini		LHT		British protectorate until 1968. Continues to drive on the same side as neighbouring countries.
Ethiopia		RHT	8 June 1964	
Fiji		LHT		The island nation was a British colony before 1970.
Finland		RHT	8 June 1858	
France		RHT	1792	Includes French Polynesia, New Caledonia, Saint Pierre and Miquelon, Wallis and Futuna, French Guiana, Réunion, Saint Barthélemy, the Collectivity of Saint Martin, Guadeloupe, and Mayotte.
Gabon		RHT		French colony before 1960.
Gambia		RHT	1 October 1965	British colony until 1965. Switched to RHT on 1 October 1965 being surrounded by the former French colony of Senegal.
Georgia		RHT		The bus line on Ilia Chavchavadze Avenue runs on the left.
Germany		RHT		
Ghana		RHT	4 August 1974	British colony until 1957. Ghana switched to RHT in 1974, a Twi language slogan was "Nifa, Nifa Enan" or "Right, Right, Fourth". Ghana has also banned RHD vehicles – it prohibited new registrations of RHD vehicles after 1 August 1974, three days before the traffic change.
Greece		RHT	1926	Originally LHT (albeit unofficially) since independence. The establishment of the traffic code switched traffic officially to RHT traffic in 1926.
Grenada		LHT		British colony before 1974. Caribbean island.
Guatemala		RHT		
Guinea		RHT		Part of French West Africa before 1958.
Guinea-Bissau		RHT	1928	Portuguese colony until 1974. Drives on the same side as its neighbours.
Guyana		LHT		British colony until 1966. One of the only two countries in continental America which are in LHT, the other being Suriname.
Haiti		RHT		French colony until 1804.
Honduras		RHT		
Hungary		RHT	1941	Originally LHT, like most of Austria-Hungary, but switched sides during World War II.
Iceland		RHT	26 May 1968	This Atlantic island nation changed to RHT on H-dagurinn. Most passenger cars were already LHD.
India		LHT		Part of British India before 1947.
Indonesia		LHT		Roads and railways were built by the Dutch, with LHT for roads to conform to British and Japanese standards and RHT for railways to conform with Dutch standards. Urban railways also use RHT. Did not change sides, unlike the Netherlands, in 1906.
Iran		RHT		
Iraq		RHT		
Ireland		LHT		What is now the Republic of Ireland was part of the United Kingdom before 1922. The Republic covers most of the island of Ireland; the rest of Ireland is part of Northern Ireland, which remains part of the United Kingdom, which is also LHT.
Israel		RHT		
Italy		RHT	1924	
Ivory Coast		RHT		Part of French West Africa before 1960.
Jamaica		LHT		British colony before 1962. Caribbean island. Most passenger vehicles are RHD, tractor-trailers and other heavy-duty trucks are mostly LHD due to being imported from the United States.
Japan		LHT		LHT was enacted in law in 1924. One of the few non-British-colony countries to use LHT. Okinawa Prefecture was RHT from 24 June 1945 to 30 July 1978 because of American rule.
Jordan		RHT		
Kazakhstan		RHT		
Kenya		LHT		Part of the British East Africa Protectorate before 1963.
Kiribati		LHT		This Pacific island nation was a British colony before 1979.
Kuwait		RHT		British Protectorate until 1961.
Kyrgyzstan		RHT		In 2012, over 20,000 cheap used RHD cars were imported from Japan.
Laos		RHT		French protectorate until 1953. The First Thai–Lao Friendship Bridge is LHT in connection to Thailand.
Latvia		RHT		
Lebanon		RHT		French Mandate of Lebanon before 1946.
Lesotho		LHT		British protectorate from 1885 to 1966. Enclave of LHT South Africa.
Liberia		RHT		Was under American control.
Libya		RHT		Italian colony from 1911 to 1947.
Liechtenstein		RHT		Landlocked between Switzerland and Austria.
Lithuania		RHT		
Luxembourg		RHT		
Madagascar		RHT		This island nation was a French colony until 1958.
Malawi		LHT		British colony before 1964.
Malaysia		LHT		British colony before 1957.
Maldives		LHT		This island nation was a British colony before 1965.
Mali		RHT		Part of French West Africa before 1960.
Malta		LHT		British colony before 1964. Island nation.
Marshall Islands		RHT		Was under American control until 1979.
Mauritania		RHT		Part of French West Africa before 1960. Mining roads between Fderîck and Zouérat are LHT.
Mauritius		LHT		This island nation was a British colony before 1968.
Mexico		RHT		
Federated States of Micronesia		RHT		Was under American control until 1979.
Moldova		RHT		
Monaco		RHT		Was under French control.
Mongolia		RHT		
Montenegro		RHT		
Morocco		RHT		Under French and Spanish protection until 1956.
Mozambique		LHT		Portuguese colony until 1975. Drives on the same side as its neighbours.
Myanmar		RHT	6 December 1970	British colony until 1948. Switched to RHT under the orders of Ne Win. Theories emerge on the reasoning behind this switch; one claimed that he met an astrologer that recommended him to switch the country's traffic to the right in order to make the nation prosper, while another claimed that international visits caused him to notice that most countries are RHT and so decided to convert the country's handedness of traffic in order to connect Myanmar's roads with other countries' roads in the future.
Namibia		LHT	1920	When South Africa occupied German South West Africa in World War I, it switched to LHT. South West Africa was administered by South Africa 1920–1990.
Nauru		LHT	1918	This island nation was administered by Australia until 1968.
Nepal		LHT		Shares open land border with LHT India.
Netherlands		RHT	1 January 1906	Includes Aruba, Curaçao, and Sint Maarten.
New Zealand		LHT		These Pacific islands, including territories Niue and Cook Islands, were former British colonies.
Nicaragua		RHT		
Niger		RHT		Part of French West Africa before 1958.
Nigeria		RHT	2 April 1972	British colony until 1960. Under the military government, it switched to RHT due to being surrounded by RHT former French colonies.
North Korea		RHT	1946	Was LHT during the period of Japanese rule. Switched to RHT after the Surrender of Japan.
North Macedonia		RHT		
Norway		RHT	1793	
Oman		RHT		
Pakistan		LHT		Part of British India before 1947.
Palau		RHT		Palau was under American control until 1986. Most passenger vehicles are RHD due to them being imported from Australia and Japan.
Palestine		RHT		
Panama		RHT	April 15, 1943	
Papua New Guinea		LHT		After Australia occupied German New Guinea during World War I, it switched to LHT.
Paraguay		RHT	25 January 1945	
Peru		RHT		
Philippines		RHT	1946	Was LHT during the Spanish and American colonial periods. Switched to RHT after the Battle of Manila in 1945. RHD vehicles such as imported buses were still used up until the late 1980s. Philippine National Railways switched to RHT in 2010. Nowadays RHD vehicles are illegal to register and operate for ordinary use under Republic Act 8506 of 1998 however RHD vintage vehicles made before 1960 in "showroom" condition or off-road specialized vehicles are allowed to be used only for motorsports events.
Poland		RHT		South-eastern Poland (former Austrian Partition) was LHT until the 1920s.
Portugal		RHT	June 1, 1928	Colonies Goa, Macau and Mozambique, which had land borders with LHT countries, did not switch and continue to drive on the left. The Porto Metro uses RHT.
Qatar		RHT		Former British protectorate. Switched to same side as neighbours.
Romania		RHT	1919	Regions of Romania (Transylvania, Bukovina, parts of the Banat, Crișana and Maramureș) that were part of Austria-Hungary were LHT until 1919.
Russia		RHT		In the Russian Far East, RHD vehicles are common due to the import of used cars from nearby Japan. The railway between Moscow and Ryazan, the Sormovskaya line in Nizhny Novgorod Metro and the Moskva River cable car use LHT.
Rwanda		RHT		Belgian colony before 1962. Considering switching to LHT.
Saint Kitts and Nevis		LHT		This Caribbean island nation was a British colony before 1983.
Saint Lucia		LHT		This Caribbean island nation was a British colony before 1979.
Saint Vincent and the Grenadines		LHT		This Caribbean island nation was a British colony before 1979.
Samoa		LHT	7 September 2009	Despite New Zealand occupying German Samoa during the first World War, the country did not switch to LHT until 2009; this was for economic reasons, to allow cheaper importation of cars from Australia, New Zealand and Japan.
San Marino		RHT		Enclaved state surrounded by Italy.
São Tomé and Príncipe		RHT	1928	Portuguese colony until 1975.
Saudi Arabia		RHT	1942	
Senegal		RHT		Part of French West Africa before 1960.
Serbia		RHT	1926	(As part of Kingdom of Serbs, Croats and Slovenes). Vojvodina was LHT while part of Austria-Hungary.
Seychelles		LHT		This island nation was a British colony until 1976.
Sierra Leone		RHT	1 March 1971	British colony until 1961. Switched to RHT being surrounded by neighbouring former French colonies. Furthermore, it banned the importation of RHD vehicles in 2013.
Singapore		LHT		This island nation was a British colony until 1963. It was also part of Malaysia until 1965.
Slovakia		RHT	1939–41	Switched during the German occupation of Czechoslovakia.
Slovenia		RHT	1926	(As part of Kingdom of Serbs, Croats and Slovenes.) Officially LHT from 1915 as part of Austria-Hungary.
Solomon Islands		LHT		This island nation was a British protectorate before 1975.
Somalia		RHT		The former British Somaliland had LHT until it formed a union with the former Italian Somaliland which had RHT.
South Africa		LHT		British colony before 1910.
South Korea		RHT	April 1, 1946	Was LHT during the period of Japanese rule. Switched to RHT after the USAMGIK Ordinance 65 came into effect.
South Sudan		RHT	1973	Part of Sudan until 2011.
Spain		RHT	1924	Up to the 1920s Barcelona was RHT, and Madrid was LHT until 1924. The Madrid Metro still uses LHT.
Sri Lanka		LHT		British Ceylon from 1815 to 1948.
Sudan		RHT	1973	Formerly Anglo-Egyptian Sudan, it switched sides 17 years later to match neighbours.
Suriname		LHT	1920s	Dutch colony until 1975. One of the only two countries in continental America which are in LHT, the other being Guyana. Did not switch sides, unlike the Netherlands itself.
Sweden		RHT	3 September 1967	The day of the switch was known as Dagen H. Most passenger vehicles were already LHD. Railways and the Stockholm Metro did not switch and continue to drive on the left.
Switzerland		RHT		
Syria		RHT		Was under French control.
Tajikistan		RHT		
Tanzania		LHT		Was British colony until 1961.
Thailand		LHT		One of the few non-British-colony LHT countries. Shares a long land border with RHT Myanmar, Laos and Cambodia.
Timor-Leste		LHT	19 July 1976	Portuguese colony until 1975. Switched to RHT with Portugal in 1928; following its annexation by Indonesia in 1976, it switched back to LHT, which it has retained since independence.
Togo		RHT		Part of French West Africa until 1960.
Tonga		LHT		British protectorate before 1970. Polynesian island nation.
Trinidad and Tobago		LHT		British colony before 1962. Caribbean nation.
Tunisia		RHT		RHT was enforced in the French protectorate of Tunisia from 1881 to 1956.
Turkey		RHT		Except Metrobus, which is usually LHT.
Turkmenistan		RHT		
Tuvalu		LHT		Formerly a British colony. Became independent in 1978.
Uganda		LHT		Part of British Uganda Protectorate from 1894 until 1962.
Ukraine		RHT	1922	Western parts of the country had LHT under Austro-Hungarian Empire
United Arab Emirates		RHT	1 September 1966	Former British protectorate.
United Kingdom and overseas territories	United Kingdom proper	LHT		An island nation with a land border with the Republic of Ireland, which is also LHT. Also LHT are the British Overseas Territories of Anguilla, Ascension Island, Montserrat, Saint Helena, and Tristan da Cunha. The Heathrow airport PRT uses RHT.
United Kingdom and overseas territories	Bermuda	LHT		Some commercial vehicles are LHD due to imports from the United States, which has RHT.
United Kingdom and overseas territories	British Indian Ocean Territory	RHT		The largest island, Diego Garcia, was leased to the United States Navy as a military base; the United States is RHT.
United Kingdom and overseas territories	British Virgin Islands	LHT		Most passenger vehicles are LHD due to imports from the United States, which is RHT.
United Kingdom and overseas territories	Cayman Islands	LHT		Most passenger vehicles are LHD due to imports from the United States, which has RHT.
United Kingdom and overseas territories	Falkland Islands	LHT		Briefly switched to RHT during the Falklands War in 1982.
United Kingdom and overseas territories	Gibraltar	RHT	June 16, 1929	Gibraltar is RHT because of its land border with Spain.
United Kingdom and overseas territories	Guernsey	LHT		Was RHT from 25 June 1941 to 1945 due to the German occupation.
United Kingdom and overseas territories	Isle of Man	LHT		
United Kingdom and overseas territories	Jersey	LHT		Was RHT from 25 June 1941 to 1945 due to the German occupation.
United Kingdom and overseas territories	Pitcairn Islands	LHT		There is no official vehicle registration system.
United Kingdom and overseas territories	South Georgia and the South Sandwich Islands	LHT		Briefly switched to RHT during the Falklands War.
United Kingdom and overseas territories	Turks and Caicos Islands	LHT		Most passenger vehicles are LHD due to imports from the United States, which has RHT.
United States	Contiguous U.S.	RHT		British colonies before 1776 (de facto) or 1783 (de jure)
United States	Alaska	RHT		
United States	Hawaii	RHT		
United States	Puerto Rico	RHT		
United States	U.S. Virgin Islands	LHT		U.S. Virgin Islands, like much of the Caribbean, is LHT and is the only American jurisdiction that still has LHT, because the islands drove on the left when the US purchased the former Danish West Indies in the 1917 Treaty of the Danish West Indies. Most passenger vehicles are LHD due to them being imported from the American mainland.
United States	Guam	RHT		
United States	Northern Mariana Islands	RHT		
United States	American Samoa	RHT		
Uruguay		RHT	2 September 1945	Became LHT in 1918, but as in some other countries in South America, changed to RHT in 1945. A speed limit of 30 km/h (19 mph) was observed until 30 September for safety.
Uzbekistan		RHT		
Vanuatu		RHT		Co-administered under France and the United Kingdom until 1980.
Vatican City		RHT		Enclave of Rome.
Venezuela		RHT		
Vietnam		RHT		French colony until 1954. The Long Bien Bridge uses LHT.
Yemen		RHT	1977	South Yemen, formerly the British colony of Aden, changed to RHT in 1977, having become one of a few communist countries to use LHT. A series of postage stamps commemorating the event was issued. At that time, North Yemen was already RHT.
Zambia		LHT		British colony before 1964.
Zimbabwe		LHT		British colony before 1965 (de facto) or 1980 (de jure).

=== Legality of wrong-hand-drive vehicles by country ===
Legality of wrong-hand-drive vehicles
Country	Usage	Registration (diplomatic vehicles)	Registration (normal vehicles)	Ref
Afghanistan	Yes	Yes	Yes	
Angola	Yes	Yes	Yes	
Argentina	Yes	Yes	Yes	
Armenia	No	No	No	
Australia	Yes	Yes	Yes	
Bahamas	Yes	Yes	Yes	
Bahrain	Yes	Unknown	Yes	
Bangladesh	Yes	Yes	Yes	
Belarus	Yes	No	No	
Belgium	Yes	Yes	Yes	
Bermuda	Yes	Yes	Yes	
Bolivia	Yes	Yes	Yes	
Brazil	No	No	No	
British Virgin Islands	Yes	Yes	Yes	
Brunei	Yes	Yes	No	
Bulgaria	Yes	Yes	Yes	
Burundi	Yes	Yes	Yes	
Cambodia	No	No	No	
Canada	Yes	Yes	Yes	
Cayman Islands	Yes	Yes	Yes	
Chile	Yes	Unknown	No	
China	Yes	Yes	No	
Cyprus	Yes	Unknown	Unknown	
Czech Republic	Yes	Yes	Yes	
Dominican Republic	Yes	Yes	Yes	
DR Congo	Yes	Yes	Yes	
El Salvador	Yes	Yes	Yes	
Ethiopia	Yes	Unknown	Unknown	
Finland	Yes	Yes	Yes	
France	Yes	Yes	Yes	
Georgia	Yes	Yes	Yes	
Germany	Yes	Yes	Yes	
Ghana	Unknown	Unknown	No	
Gibraltar	Yes	Yes	Yes	
Greece	Yes	No	No	
Guernsey	Yes	Unknown	Unknown	
Guyana	Yes	Unknown	Unknown	
Honduras	Yes	Yes	Yes	
Hong Kong	Yes	Yes	No	
Hungary	Yes	Yes	Yes	
India	Yes	Yes	No	
Indonesia	Yes	Yes	Yes	
Iran	Yes	Unknown	Unknown	
Ireland	Yes	Yes	Yes	
Israel	Yes	Unknown	Unknown	
Italy	Yes	Unknown	Unknown	
Japan	Yes	Yes	Yes	
Jersey	Yes	Yes	Yes	
Kazakhstan	Yes	Yes	Yes	
Kenya	Yes	Yes	Yes	
Kyrgyzstan	Yes	Yes	Yes	
Laos	Yes	Unknown	Unknown	
Lithuania	Yes	Yes	Yes	
Macau	Yes	Yes	Yes	
Malaysia	Yes	Yes	No	
Malta	Yes	Yes	Yes	
Federated States of Micronesia	Yes	Yes	Yes	
Mongolia	Yes	Yes	Yes	
Myanmar	Yes	Unknown	Unknown	
Nepal	Yes	Unknown	Unknown	
Netherlands	Yes	Yes	Yes	
New Zealand	Yes	Yes	Yes	
Nicaragua	Yes	Yes	Yes	
Nigeria	Yes	Yes	No	
North Korea	Yes	Yes	Yes	
Northern Cyprus	Yes	Unknown	Unknown	
Norway	Yes	Yes	Yes	
Pakistan	Yes	Unknown	Unknown	
Palau	Yes	Yes	Yes	
Paraguay	Yes	Yes	Yes	
Peru	Yes	Yes	Yes	
Philippines	No	No	No	
Poland	Yes	Yes	Yes	
Romania	Yes	Yes	Yes	
Russia	Yes	Yes	Yes	
Rwanda	Yes	Yes	Yes	
Saudi Arabia	No	No	No	
Sierra Leone	No	No	No	
Singapore	Yes	Yes	Yes	
Slovakia	Yes	Yes	Yes	
Somalia	Yes	Unknown	Unknown	
Somaliland	Yes	Yes	Yes	
South Africa	Yes	Yes	No	
South Korea	Yes	Yes	Yes	
South Sudan	Yes	Unknown	Unknown	
Spain	Yes	Unknown	Unknown	
Suriname	Yes	Unknown	Unknown	
Taiwan	Yes	Yes	No	
Tanzania	Yes	Unknown	Unknown	
Thailand	Yes	Yes	No	
Turkey	Yes	Unknown	Unknown	
Turks and Caicos Islands	Yes	Yes	Yes	
Uganda	Yes	Yes	Yes	
Ukraine	Yes	Yes	No	
United Arab Emirates	Yes	Yes	Yes	
United Kingdom	Yes	Yes	Yes	
United States	Yes	Yes	Yes	
U.S. Virgin Islands	Yes	Yes	Yes	
Vietnam	Yes	Yes	No	
Yemen	Yes	Yes	Yes	
Zambia	Yes	Yes	Unknown	

According to the Vienna Convention on Road Traffic, which mostly covers Europe, if having a vehicle registered and legal to drive in one of the Convention countries, it is legal to drive it in any other of the countries, for visits and first year of residence after moving. This is regardless of whether it fulfils all the rules of the visitor countries. This convention does not affect rules on usage or registration of local vehicles.

== See also ==
- Hook turn
- Traffic-light signalling and operation
- World Forum for Harmonization of Vehicle Regulations
