= 730 (transport) =

Day in Okinawa when the change from right-hand traffic to left-hand traffic occurred

In Japan's Okinawa Prefecture, 730 (nana-san-maru) is a reference to July 30, 1978, the day the prefecture switched back from driving on the right-hand side of the road to the left.

== Overview ==
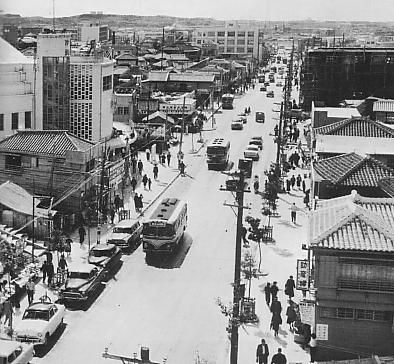
Kokusai Dori, Naha, in the early 1950s with right hand traffic

Originally, Okinawa drove on the left-hand side of the road, the same as the rest of Japan. However, after the defeat of Japan during World War II, the prefecture went under control of the United States and on June 24, 1945, was made to drive on the right. Even after control of Okinawa was returned to Japan in 1972, it still had its traffic driving on the right for six years due to delays in the handover to Japan and delays due to the Expo '75. However, in accordance with Article 9 of the Geneva Convention on Road Traffic that restricts each country to having only one traffic direction, all the traffic in the prefecture was changed back to driving on the left on July 30, 1978. It is one of very few places to have changed from right- to left- traffic in the late twentieth century. The day symbolizes Okinawa's return to Japan. Cars sold until this date were generally left-hand drive, unlike those sold on the Japanese mainland. Such cars are referred to as "729 cars", for the day before the switchover.

== Changing the direction ==
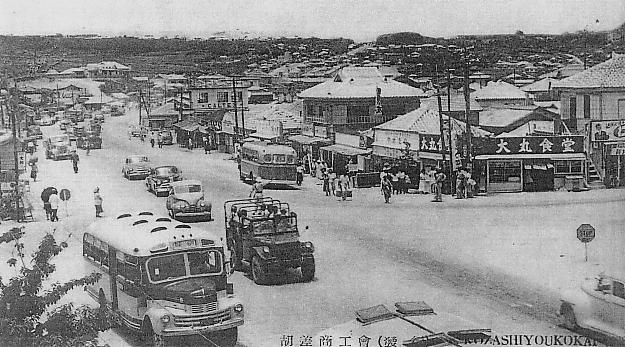
Koza Crossing, Okinawa, c. 1955. Cars drive on the right.

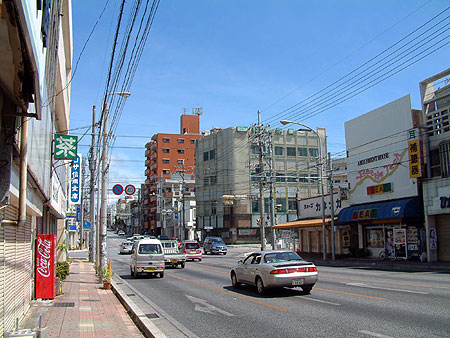
Koza Crossing, 2008. Cars drive on the left.

All traffic, except emergency vehicles, was banned from 22:00 July 29, 1978. Eight hours after, at 06:00 July 30, traffic resumed, changed on the left-hand side. Traffic signs were changed within these eight hours.

As there were not enough police officers in Okinawa Prefecture to control all the traffic for the day, reinforcements were assembled from other parts of Japan.

Most left-hand side signs and signals were installed and covered before July 30. During the eight-hour transition, the covers were removed and transferred to the old right-hand side signs. The scheme was called the Kudaka Scheme (久高方式, Kudaka Hōshiki), after Hiroshi Kudaka (久高弘, Kudaka Hiroshi), Okinawa Prefectural police officer in charge of 730, who "invented" the scheme.

The prefecture publicized the change beforehand through the 730 Campaign (730キャンペーン), including posters and TV advertisements. The TV advertisement featured Yōkō Gushiken, a famous boxer from the prefecture.

In the prefecture, from the late 1970s until the early 1980s, right-hand drive vehicles were often called 730 cars (730車両 or 730カー), while LHD vehicles were called 729 cars (729車両 or 729カー). Both expressions are now obsolete. Although rare, there are still a few "729 cars" surviving on the road.

The Japanese government spent some $150 million to cover the prefecture's conversion costs, involving 4,200 kilometres (2,600 mi) of highways. This also included relocating bus stops, moving signs, replacing 1,000 buses and 5,000 taxis, as well as replacing headlights on 300,000 vehicles so that they aimed to the left instead of the right. The United States military spent nearly $500,000 to switch signs on its bases.

== Bus ==
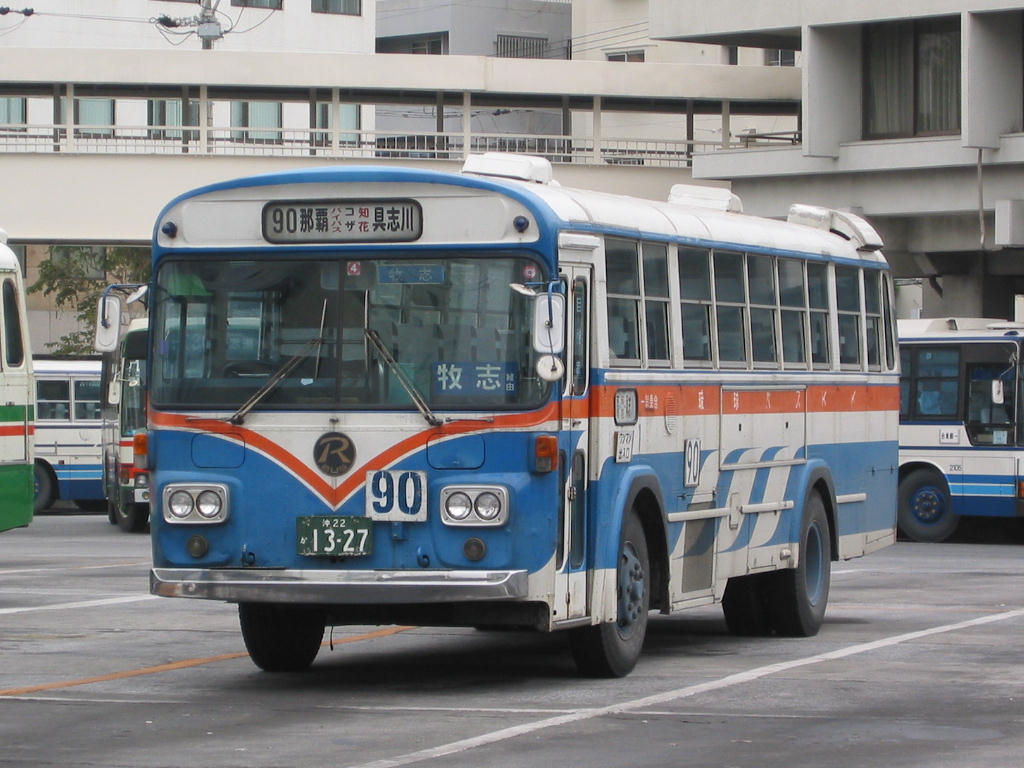
730 bus of Ryūkyū Bus

Local bus companies had to change passenger doors on the right-hand side of the vehicle to the left. The bus operators in the prefecture, namely Ryūkyū Bus (the present Ryūkyū Bus Kōtsū), Okinawa Bus, Naha Kōtsū (the present Naha Kōtsū Bus), and Tōyō Bus introduced more than 1000 buses in total, with subsidies from the prefecture and the national government. These particular buses are sometimes called 730 buses (730車両 or 730バス),

Many LHD buses were introduced at the time of Expo '75, held before the 730. As these vehicles were relatively new, some of them were modified to RHD with left-hand side doors. Some others were sold to countries with right hand traffic — e.g. Mainland China, Taiwan, the Philippines, Cuba, Central America, Afghanistan, the Middle East.

Many 730 buses survived until the 2000s. However, most of them retired after 2004. As of 2008, both Okinawa Bus and Tōyō Bus each still preserve one, but neither operates them regularly.

== Aftermath ==
There were many traffic accidents immediately after the 730. When turning right/left on a crossing, drivers often approached to the right-hand side of the road, although they had to approach to the left, resulting in one bus overturning. This led to many collisions on a crossing. Larger accidents included a frontal collision of two buses.

== Memorial ==
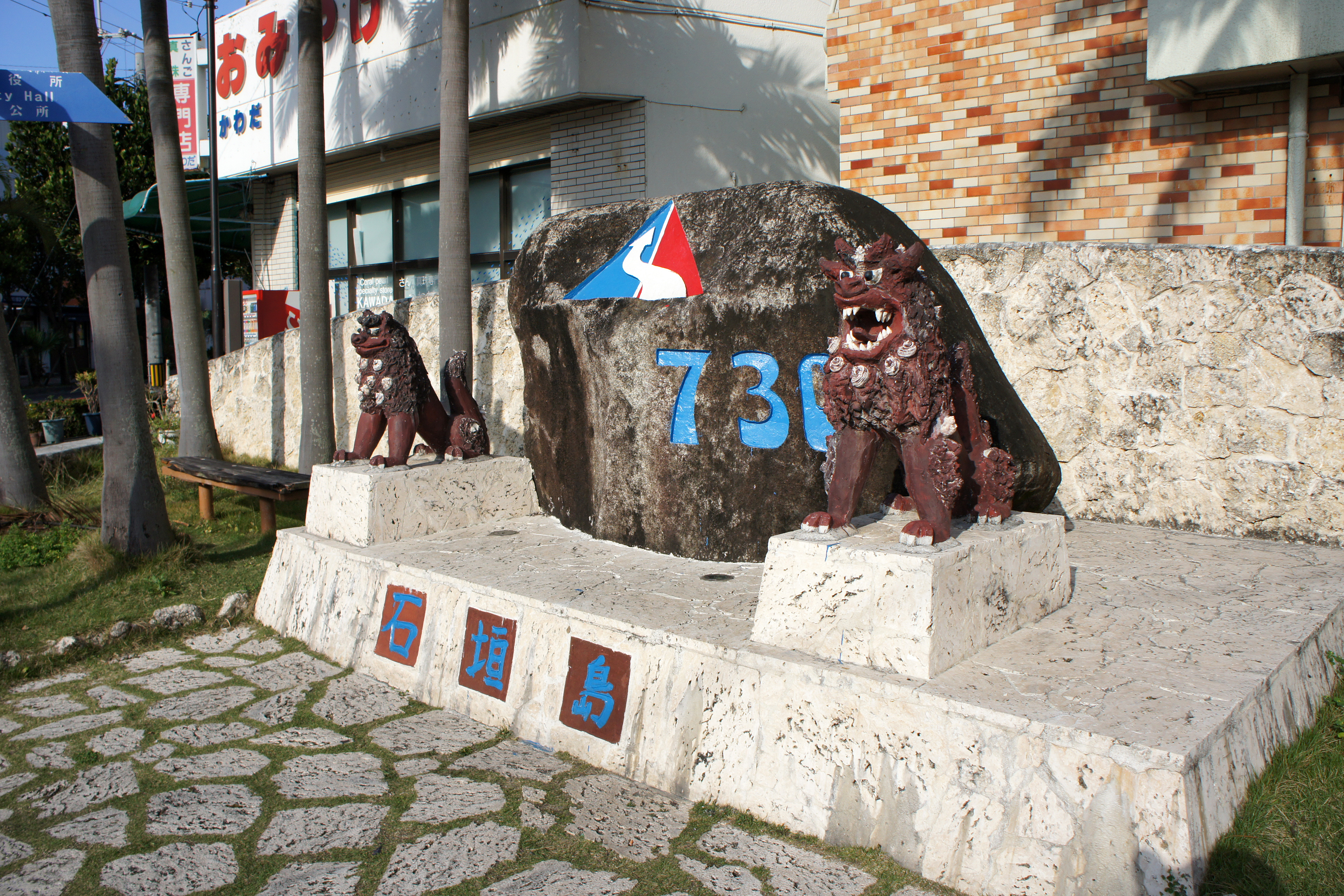
The 730 Memorial at the 730 Crossing in Ishigaki

In Ishigaki, there is the 730 Crossing (730交差点) with a 1 metre (3 foot) tall memorial stone. In Miyakojima, there is the 730 Memorial Tower (730記念塔).

== See also ==
- Right- and left-hand traffic
- Dagen H
- Switch to right-hand traffic in Czechoslovakia
