= H-dagurinn =

Day Iceland changed from left hand to right hand traffic (26 May 1968)

H-dagurinn or Hægri dagurinn (lit. 'The right day') on 26 May 1968 was the day that Iceland changed from left hand traffic to right hand traffic. The change itself occurred formally at 6:00 am.

== History ==
Although Iceland had been ruled by Denmark, which officially adopted driving on the right in 1793, it had continued to drive on the left; a plan to switch to right-hand traffic was interrupted by World War II, when the country was under British military occupation, as military traffic was greater than that of civilians.

Iceland's parliament (Alþingi) made the following demand of the government on 13 May 1964: "Alþingi urges the government to initiate as soon as possible research into how best to move the traffic to the right hand side of the road."

A law was passed in 1965, under which the country would change to driving on the right in 1968. The decision by Sweden to change to right hand traffic in 1967, bringing it into line with other Nordic countries, also influenced Iceland's decision. In addition, Iceland was hosting an increased number of visitors from the United States and mainland Europe.

The Traffic Commission (Umferðarnefnd) was assigned to handle the task. The cost of the change amounted to over 33 million kronur for modifications to buses and 12 million kronur for changes to infrastructure. During the night before the change 1662 signs all over the country were changed, making the total of signs changed 5727.

The only injury from the changeover was a boy on a bicycle who broke his leg.

Traffic accident rates briefly dropped as drivers overcompensated for the increased risk from driving on the unfamiliar side of the road, before returning to the level following the trend prior to the changeover.
