= Switch to right-hand traffic in Czechoslovakia =

Change of left-hand to right-hand traffic

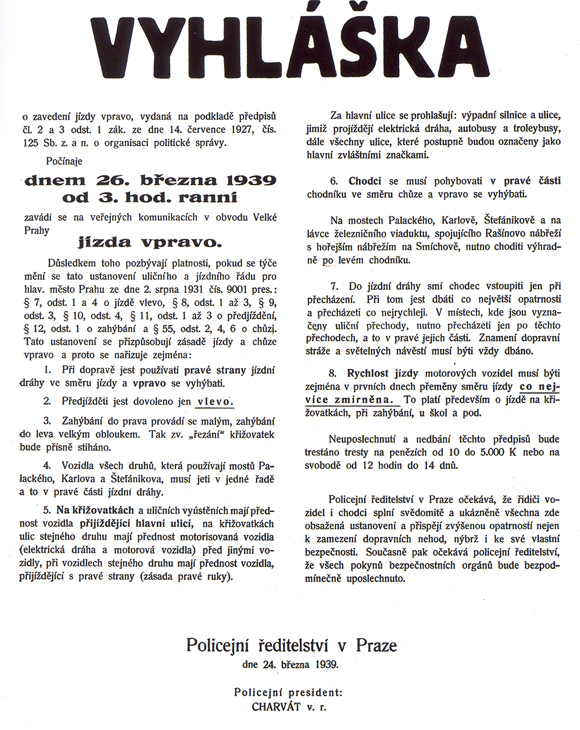
Police ordinance of right-hand traffic in the Prague area

The switch to right-hand traffic in Czechoslovakia was a change in the rule of the road in 1938–1939.

Before 1938, Czechoslovakia drove on the left. In 1925, Czechoslovakia accepted the Paris convention and undertook the change to right-hand traffic "within a reasonable time frame". In 1931, the government decreed to change over within five years, which did not happen. The main obstacles were financial cost and widespread opposition in rural areas. In November 1938, parliament finally decided to change to right-hand traffic with effect from 1 May 1939. Progress towards this goal continued under the Nazi occupation.

== Protectorate of Bohemia and Moravia ==
The occupation of the Czech part of the country by Nazi Germany and its transformation into the German Protectorate of Bohemia and Moravia (in German: Protektorat Böhmen und Mähren) on 15 March 1939 sped up the change. A few places switched the same day (e.g. Ostrava), the rest of the area of the Protectorate following a decree on 17 March, and Prague got a few more days to implement the change and switched on 26 March.

Tramway infrastructure in Prague was modified in November 1938. In the final days there were daily reminders of the change in newspapers and large warnings were painted on the streets and on tramway cars. Drivers adapted quickly although a total of 26 traffic accidents and one fatality on the day of the switch were reported in Prague.

== Slovakia ==
Right hand traffic was already introduced in Slovakia by a decree of the government of "autonomous Slovakia" within Czechoslovakia in late 1938. After the creation of the Slovak State in March 1939, buses in the capital Bratislava were adapted, and the last roads in Slovakia switched to the new system in 1940/1941.

The areas which are nowadays the southern border regions of Slovakia were subsequently part of Hungary (under the terms of the First Vienna Award), and did therefore change to right hand traffic as late as 1941, together with the rest of wartime Hungary.

== See also ==
- Right- and left-hand traffic
- Dagen H
- 730 (transport)
