= Moskva River Cable Car =

Cable car in Moscow, Russia

- Московская канатная дорога
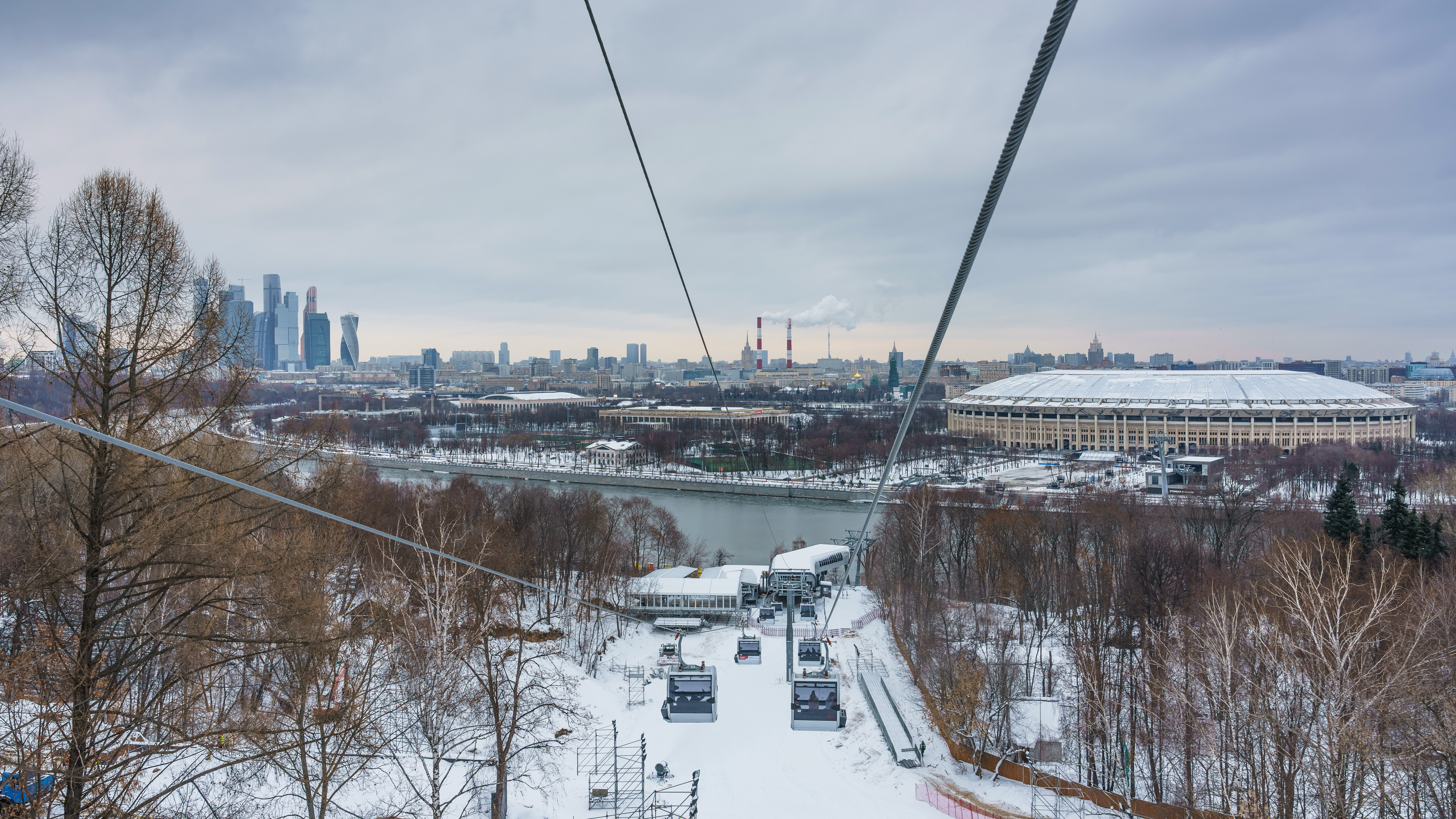
- View in Winter
- Interactive map of Moskva River Cable Car

Overview
- Location: Ulitsa Kosygina, 28, Moscow, Russia, 119270
- Country: Russia
- Open: 1953
- Closed: 2016
- Reopened: 26 November 2018
- Website: http://srkvg.ru/

Technical features
- Line length: 720 meters

Opening of the Moskva River cable car, 26 November 2018

The Moscow cable car (Russian: Московская канатная дорога, romanized: Moskovskaya kanatnaya doroga) crosses the Moskva River in Moscow, Russia. The original cable car was built in 1953 and consisted of two stations. It was demolished in 2016, with construction of the replacement station beginning in 2017. Construction ended in 2018 with the addition of a new station located along the Vorobyovy Gory slopes, where a ski lift once stood. The cable car resumed operation in November 2018.

== History ==
The first Russian cable car line was built in 1953 to provide access to the ski slope at Sparrow Hills. The 340-meter line stretched from a station at the base of the hills to another near the observation platform.

In 2016, the cable car was deemed beyond repair and was demolished as part of a reconstruction program of the sports complex at the Sparrow Hills building.

The new cable car project was started in January 2017. Construction began in May 2017 and was completed in November 2018. The new cable car was officially opened on 26 November 2018, and became available to passengers the following day. The new Moscow cable car is 720 meters long, with three stations. The new system was constructed locally using machinery from Bartholet Maschinenbau.

== Stations ==
The new line contains three stations. Luzhniki (Лужники), on the east bank of the Moskva, lies near the Luzhniki Stadium. This station includes boarding areas and basic visitor amenities. A lift was later added to the station for accessibility. Worobjowy Gory (Воробьёвы горы), on the west, lies at the foot of Sparrow Hills, which it is named after, and is used for renting sports equipment. Plans for a museum space have also been announced. Kosygina (Косыгина) is situated at the observation platform on Sparrow Hills, providing access to viewing points and nearby walking areas.

== Description ==
There are 35 covered gondolas, each with eight seats. The gondolas, designed by Porsche Design Studio, include features such as interior lighting, media screens, and mounts for bicycles and winter sports equipment. Passengers are also able to use audio guides in English, Chinese, German, and Russian. There are also 10 additional chairlifts with four seats each for competitive skiers and snowboarders. They run on the smaller cable section between Vorobyovskaya Embankment and the observation point. The cable cars can carry up to 1,600 passengers every hour, and run all year. According to local reports, approximately 1.8 million passengers used the cable car in its first year of operation.
