= Dagen H =

3 Sept 1967 in Sweden, when traffic changed from left- to right-hand

- Campaign logo
- Date: 3 September 1967
- Time: 05:00
- Location: Sweden
- Cause: Shift from left-hand to right-hand traffic
- Outcome: Successful transition; initial decrease in accidents

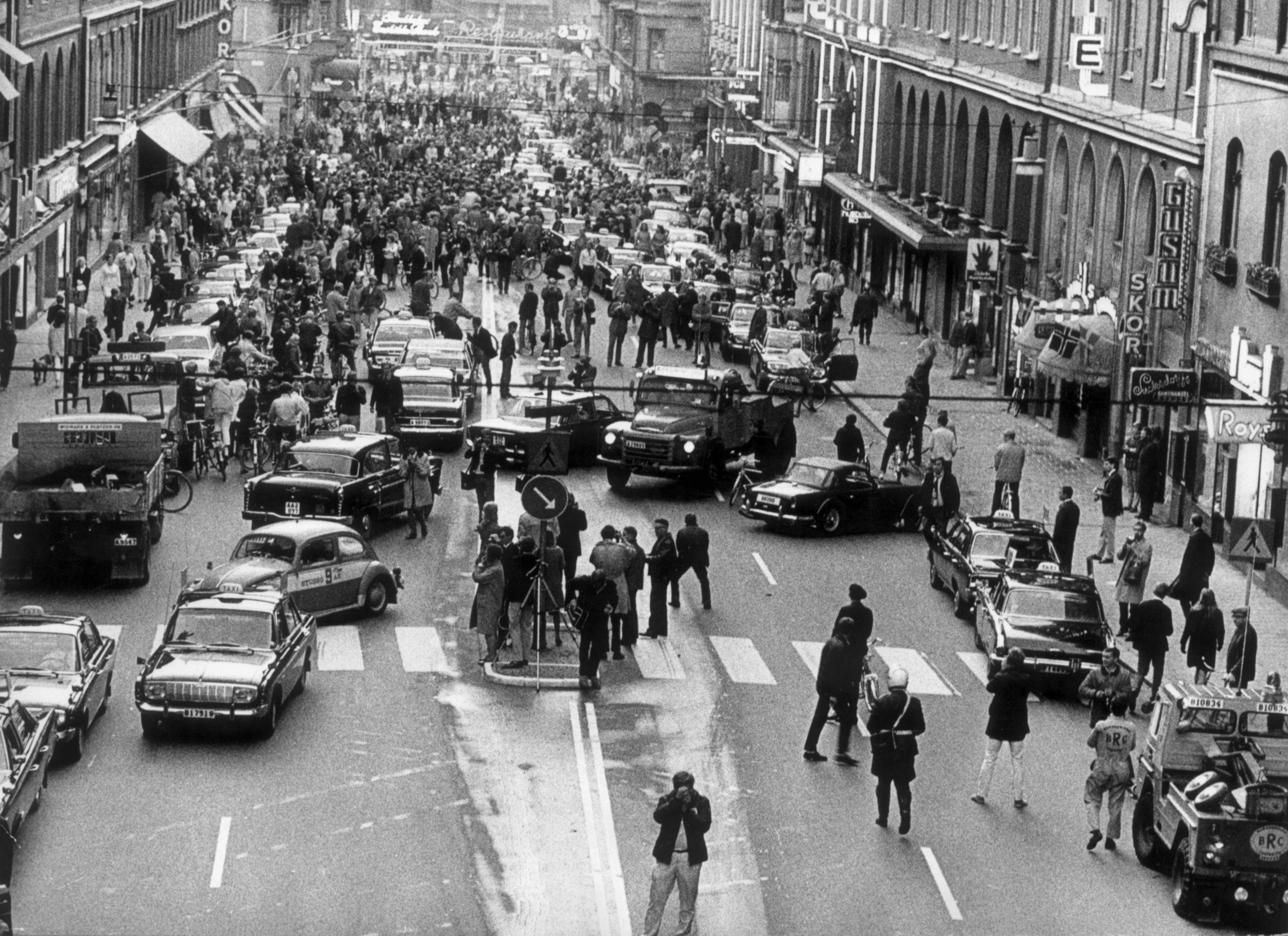
Kungsgatan, Stockholm, 3 September 1967, at or around the moment of transition at 5:00 AM, on the morning when Sweden changed from left-side traffic to right-side traffic

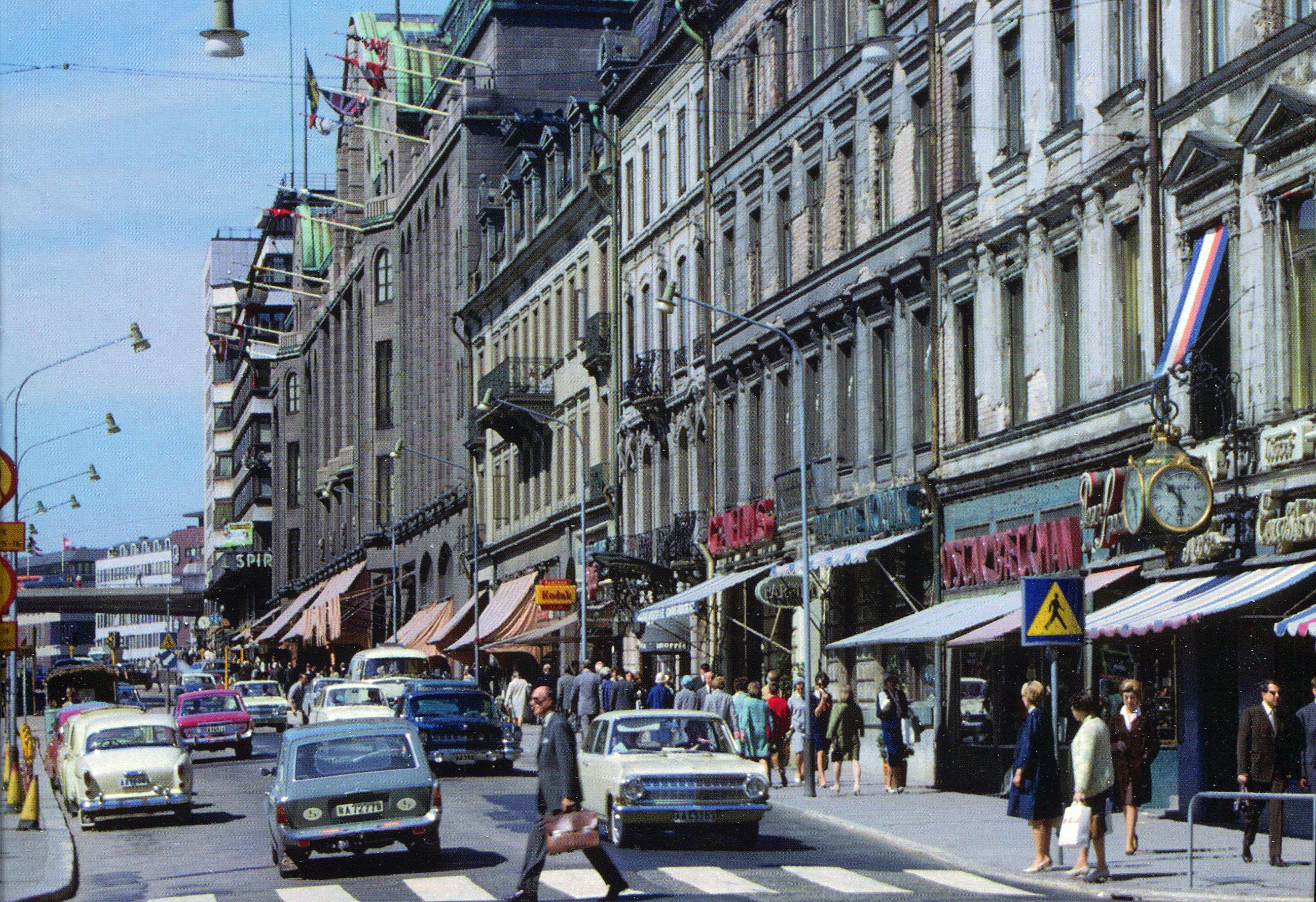
Left-hand traffic in Stockholm in 1966

Dagen H (H-day), typically known today as "Högertrafikomläggningen" (lit. 'the right-hand traffic reorganisation'), was on 3 September 1967, the day where Sweden would switch from driving on the left-hand side of the road to the right. The "H" stands for "Högertrafik", the Swedish word for right-hand traffic. It was by far the largest logistical event in Sweden's history.

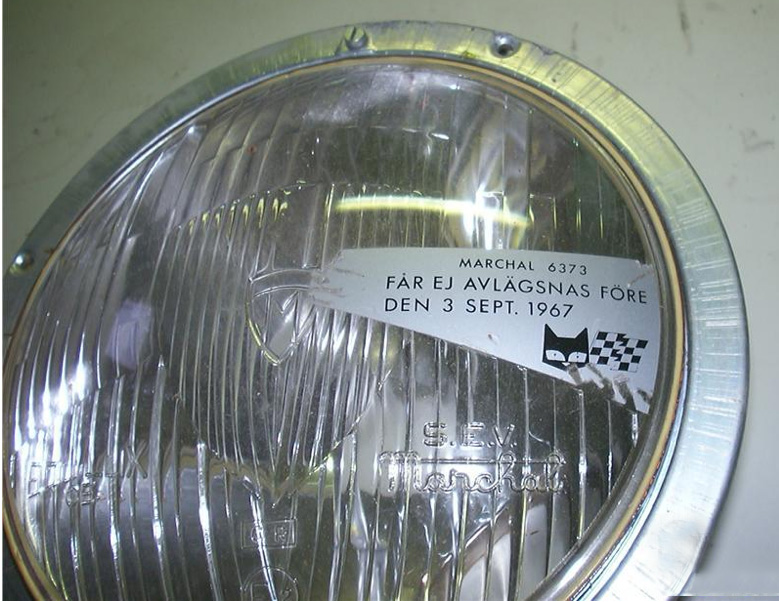
Headlamp sold in Sweden not long before Dagen H. Opaque decal blocks the lens portion that would provide low beam upkick to the right, and bears warning "Not to be removed before 3 September 1967".

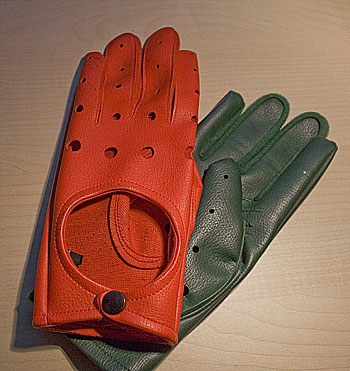
A pair of coloured gloves used in 1967 by Swedish authorities in order to remind drivers they should drive on the right as the traffic was changed

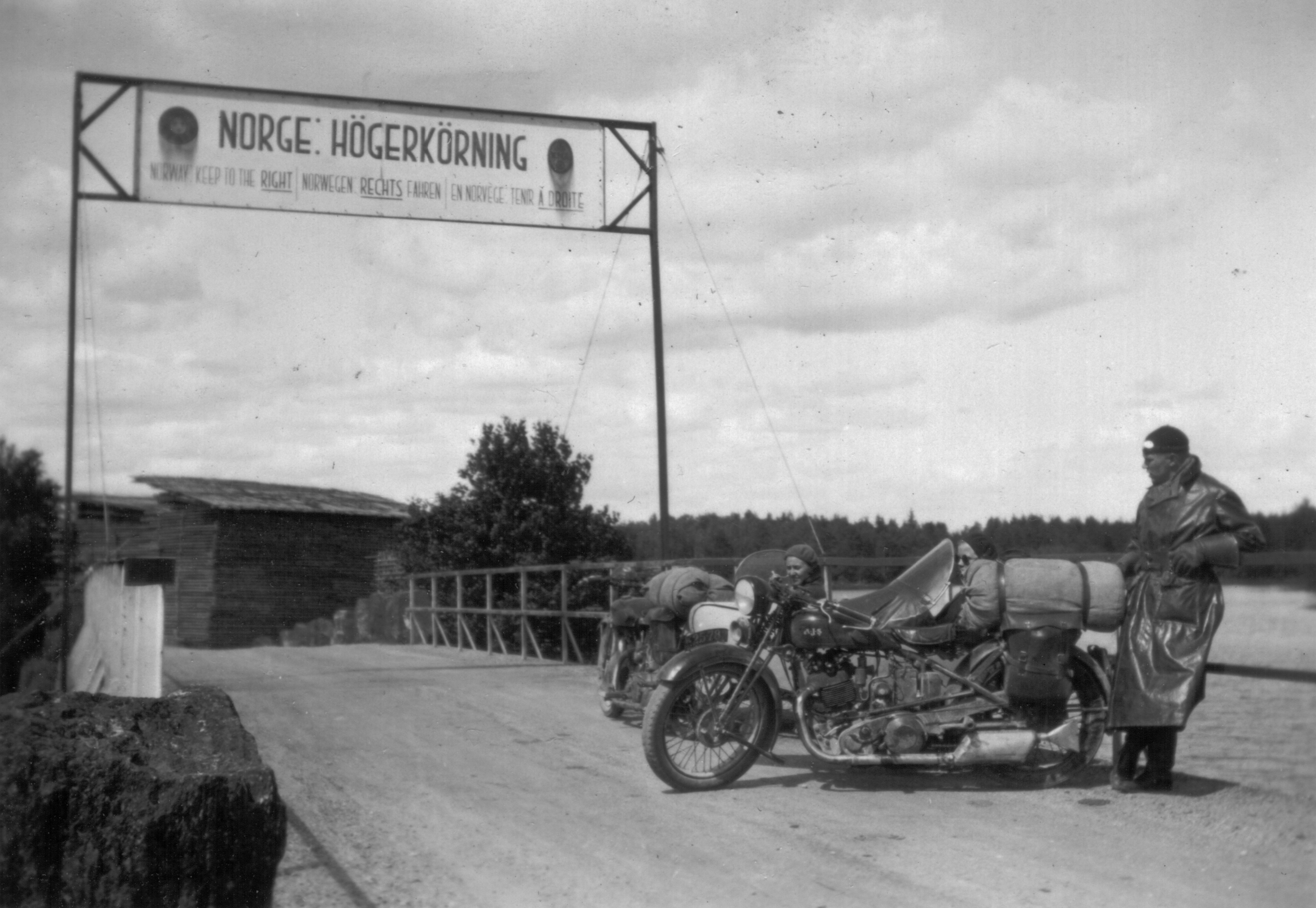
Sign at the border crossing in four languages reminding of the right hand drive in Norway

== Background ==
There were various arguments for the change:

- All neighbouring countries drove on the right, including Norway and Finland, in which Sweden shares land borders, with 5 million vehicles crossing annually.
- More than 90 percent of Swedes drove left-hand-drive vehicles, and this led to many head-on collisions when passing on narrow two-lane highways, along with difficulty changing lanes. City buses were among the very few vehicles that conformed to the normal opposite-steering wheel rule, being right-hand-drive (RHD).

However, the change was unpopular; in a 1955 referendum, 83 percent voted to keep driving on the left. Nevertheless, the Riksdag approved Prime Minister Tage Erlander's proposal on 10 May 1963 of right-hand traffic beginning in 1967, as the number of cars on the road tripled from 500,000 to 1.5 million and was expected to reach 2.8 million by 1975. The Swedish Commission for the Introduction of Right-Hand Driving (Statens Högertrafikkommission, HTK) was established to oversee the change. It also began implementing a four-year education programme on the advice of psychologists.

The public information campaign leading up to Dagen H included extensive advertising, road markings, and even distribution of reminder items like gloves and stickers to ensure everyone was aware of the change.

The campaign included displaying the Dagen H logo on various commemorative items, including milk cartons and underwear. Swedish television held a contest for songs about the change, and the winning entry was "Håll dig till höger, Svensson" ('Keep to the right, Svensson') written by Expressen journalist Peter Himmelstrand and performed by The Telstars.

As Dagen H neared, every intersection was equipped with an extra set of poles and traffic signals wrapped in black plastic. Workers roamed the streets early in the morning on Dagen H to remove the plastic. A parallel set of lines was painted on the roads with white paint, then covered with black tape. Before Dagen H, Swedish roads had used yellow lines. Approximately 350,000 signs had to be removed or replaced, including some 20,000 in Stockholm alone.

Vehicles had to have their original left-hand-traffic headlamps replaced with right-traffic units. One of the reasons the Riksdag pushed ahead with Dagen H despite public unpopularity was that most vehicles in Sweden at the time used inexpensive, standard-size round headlamps, but the trend towards more expensive model-specific headlamps had begun in continental Europe, and was expected to spread through most other parts of the world. Further delay in changing over from left- to right-hand traffic would have greatly increased the cost burden to vehicle owners.

== The switch ==
On Dagen H, Sunday, 3 September 1967, all non-essential traffic was banned from the roads from 01:00 to 06:00. Any vehicles on the roads during that time had to come to a complete stop at 04:50, then carefully change to the right-hand side of the road and stop again (to give others time to switch sides of the road and avoid a head-on collision) before being allowed to proceed at 05:00. In Stockholm and Malmö, however, the ban was longer – from 10:00 on Saturday until 15:00 on Sunday – to allow work crews to reconfigure intersections. Certain other towns also saw an extended ban, from 15:00 on Saturday until 15:00 on Sunday.

One-way streets presented unique problems. Bus stops had to be constructed on the other side of the street. Intersections had to be reshaped to allow traffic to merge.

== Results ==
The relatively smooth changeover saw a temporary reduction in the number of accidents. On the day of the change, only 157 minor accidents were reported, of which only 32 involved personal injuries, with only a low number being serious. On the Monday following Dagen H, there were 125 reported traffic accidents, compared to a range of 130 to 198 for previous Mondays, none of them fatal. Experts suggested that changing to driving on the right reduced accidents while overtaking, as people already drove left-hand drive vehicles, thereby having a better view of the road ahead; additionally, the change caused a marked surge in perceived risk that exceeded the actual level, and thus was followed by very cautious behaviour that caused a major decrease in road fatalities. Indeed, fatal car-to-car and car-to-pedestrian accidents dropped sharply as a result, and the number of motor insurance claims went down by 40%.

These initial improvements did not last, however. The number of motor insurance claims returned to "normal" over the next six weeks and, by 1969, the accident rates were back to the levels seen before the change.

Trams in central Stockholm, in Helsingborg and most lines in Malmö (which ultimately abolished its tram system in 1973) were withdrawn and replaced by buses, and more than 1,000 new buses were purchased with doors on the right-hand side. Some 8,000 older buses were retrofitted to provide doors on both sides, while Gothenburg and Malmö exported their left-traffic buses to Pakistan and Kenya.

Although all road traffic in Sweden changed to the right-hand side, railways and the metro system in Stockholm did not switch to the new rule and continued to drive on the left, with the exception of tram systems. Additionally, many of them were abandoned as a result of Dagen H; only the trams in Norrköping and Gothenburg and three suburban lines in the Stockholm area (Nockebybanan and Lidingöbanan) survived. Gothenburg faced high costs for reconfiguring trams, while Stockholm's budget only covered purchasing new buses, since the remaining lines had bidirectional trams with doors on both sides. In any event, most trams in Stockholm were replaced by the Metro, a decision made long before the Dagen H decision.

Fellow Nordic country Iceland changed to driving on the right on 26 May 1968, on a day known as H-dagurinn.

== See also ==
- 730 (transport) – Switch to left-hand traffic in Okinawa, Japan
- Switch to right-hand traffic in Czechoslovakia
- Transport in Sweden
