= 1955 Swedish driving side referendum =

- 16 October 1955

Results
Choice	Votes	%
Change to driving on the right	400,061	15.50%
Keep driving on the left	2,139,996	82.89%
Blank votes	41,630	1.61%
Valid votes	2,581,687	99.77%
Invalid votes	6,043	0.23%
Total votes	2,587,730	100.00%
Registered voters/turnout	4,866,100	53.18%

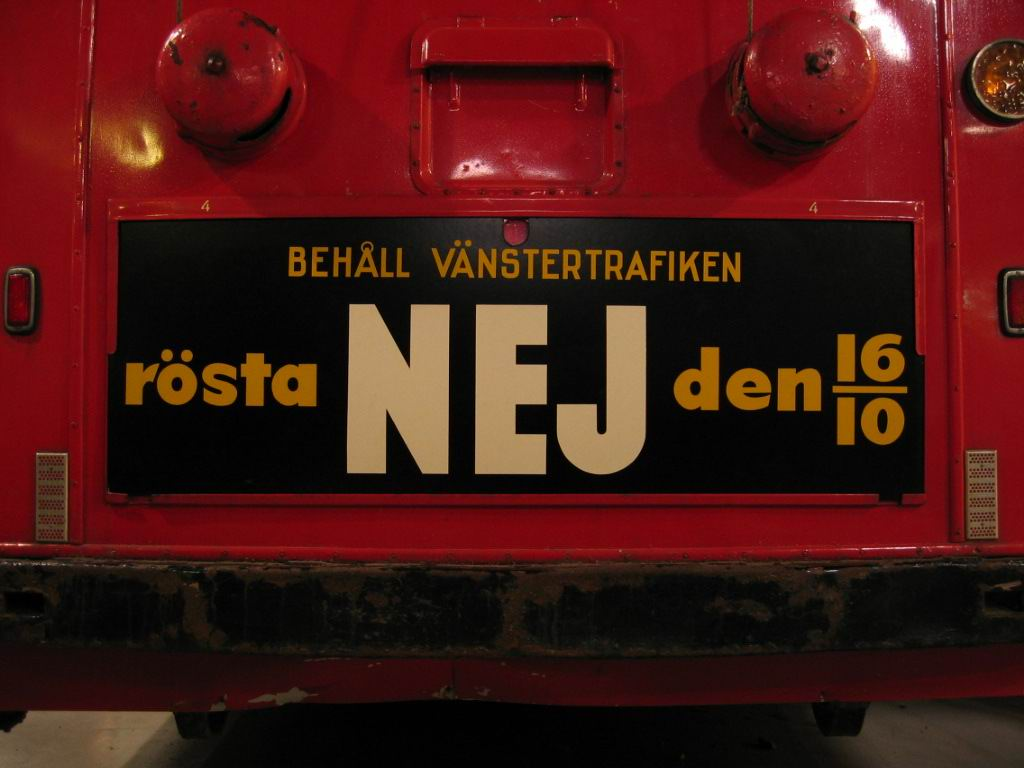
'No' vote campaign poster. Translated it reads: "Keep left-hand traffic. Vote NO on 16/10."

A non-binding referendum on the introduction of right hand traffic was held in Sweden on 16 October 1955.

The voter turnout was 53.2%, and the suggestion failed by 15.5% against 82.9%. However, eight years later, in 1963, the Riksdag approved the change, following pressure from the Council of Europe and the Nordic Council. Traffic in Sweden switched from driving on the left-hand side of the road to the right on 3 September 1967 (see Dagen H).

== Result ==
Choice	Votes	%
For	400,061	15.50
Against	2,139,996	82.89
Blank	41,630	1.61
Total	2,581,687	100.00
Valid votes	2,581,687	99.77
Invalid votes	6,043	0.23
Total votes	2,587,730	100.00
Registered voters/turnout	4,866,100	53.18
Source: Nationalencyklopedin, Election Authority
