= Buses in Stockholm County =

Public transport in Stockholm, Sweden

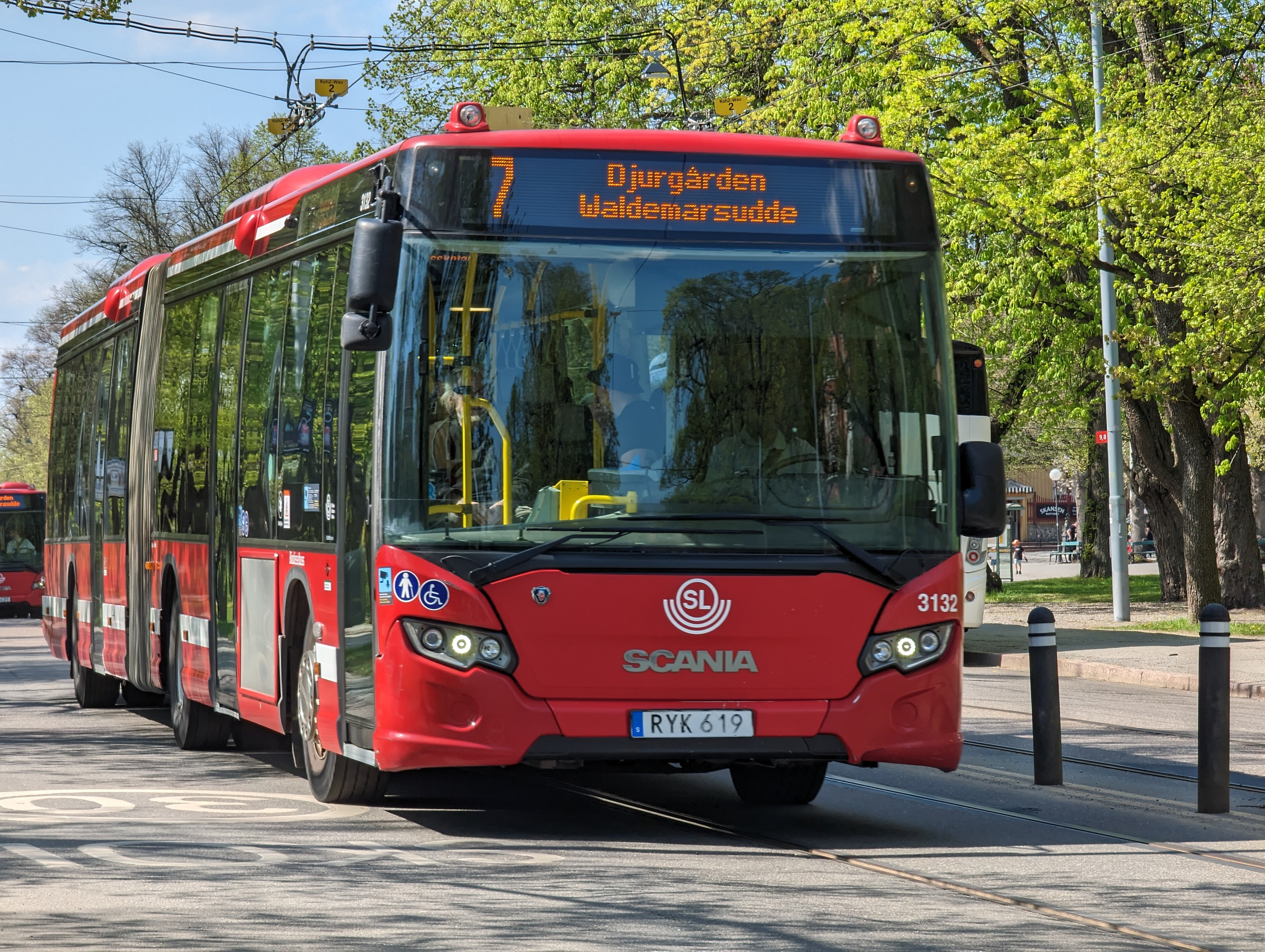
An SL bus in Djurgården in 2023

Buses in Stockholm County are a key part of the public transport system in the Stockholm area, which includes the city of Stockholm and its surrounding municipalities. The bus network is managed by Storstockholms Lokaltrafik (SL), the public transport authority responsible for coordination and ticketing of all transit services in the county, including buses, local rail, the Stockholm Metro, commuter rail, and some buses. SL operates under the jurisdiction of Region Stockholm, which oversees transport policy and contracts with private operators to run the services.

The bus network extends across Stockholm County, providing connections between urban and suburban areas, as well as linking outlying municipalities. SL contracts various private companies such as Keolis, VR Sverige, Nobina, Transdev, and Stockholms Spårvägar to operate the buses through public procurement processes that ensure services are efficient and integrated with the wider public transport system.

== History ==
=== Early horse-drawn services ===
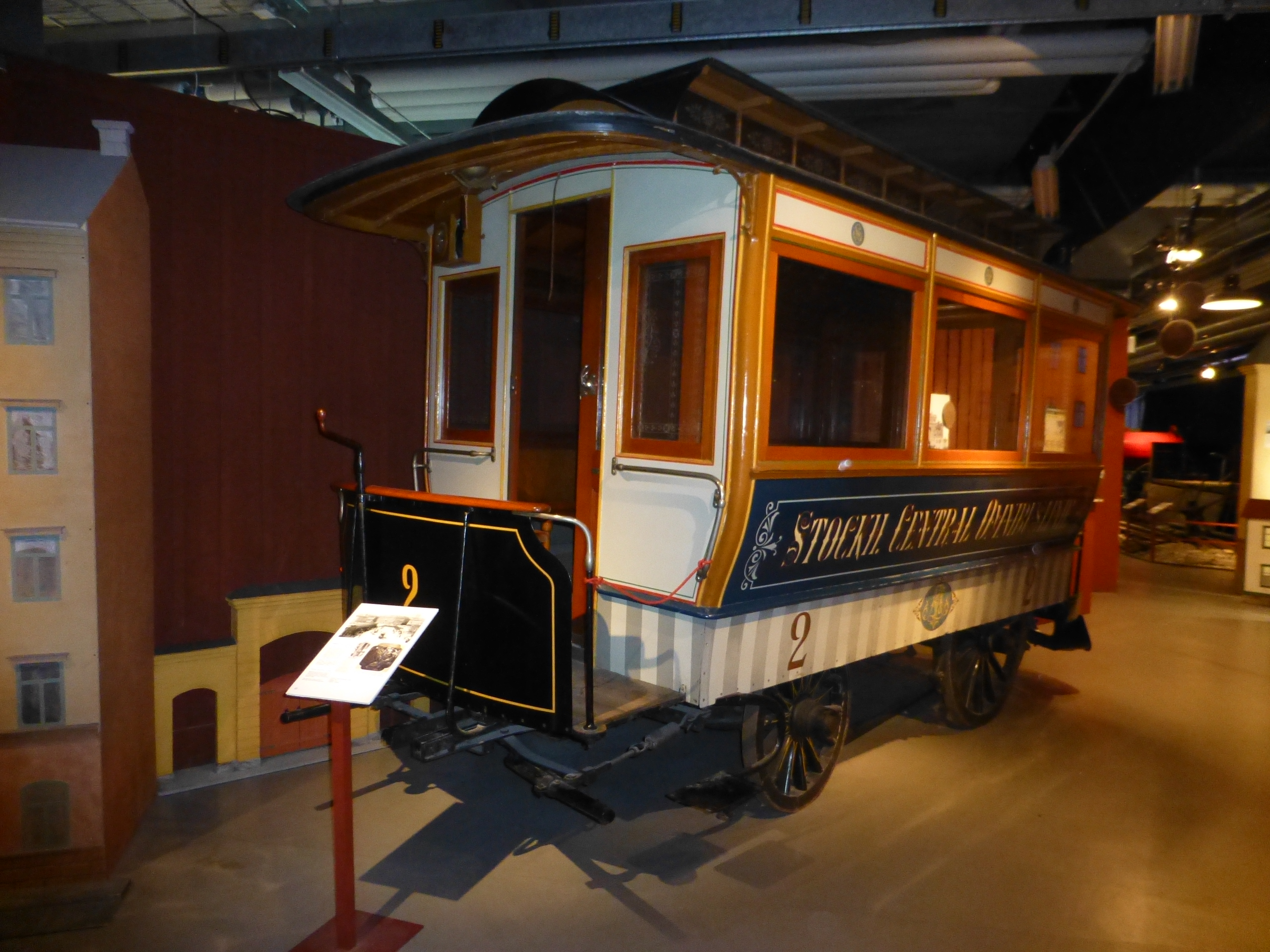
A horse-drawn omnibus at the Spårvägsmuseet in 2013.

Public transport in Stockholm County began in the 1630s with the gästgivarskjuts, a system where local carriers and farmers provided carriage services between inns. This system operated for several centuries but was gradually replaced, officially ending in 1933, with the last services departing from Stockholm in 1913.

The 18th century saw the introduction of stagecoach routes, beginning with services between Stockholm and Uppsala in 1722. This service, known as "forvagnstrafik," and other routes were short-lived due to low demand. Attempts were made to connect other locations, such as the route from Stockholm to Ystad, but these also ceased quickly.

In 1791, a local stagecoach service began between Stockholm and Drottningholm Palace, but it was similarly short-lived, ending around 1802. Stagecoach services resumed in 1829, connecting Stockholm with cities like Enköping, Uppsala, and Grisslehamn. Horse-drawn omnibus services were also established in the early 19th century, starting with a route on Djurgården in 1831 and an urban line, "Försöket," in 1835. These services peaked in the 1850s before being gradually replaced by steam ferries and trams, with the last horse-drawn omnibus line closing in 1902.

=== Introduction of motorised bus services ===
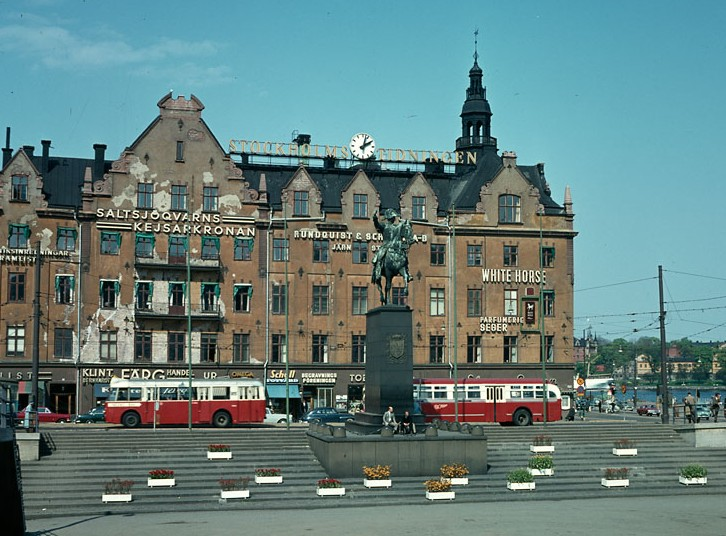
Red SS buses at Karl XIV Johans staty and Räntmästarhuset in 1963.

Motorised buses were first tested in Stockholm in 1899 with a Daimler vehicle on Drottninggatan. Though early trials were unsuccessful, motorised bus services expanded significantly from 1919, connecting suburban areas around Stockholm. In 1925, AB Stockholms Spårvägar (SS) took over urban bus routes, while several other regional bus companies emerged to service suburban areas.

During World War II, fuel and rubber rationing forced reductions in bus services. Following the war, trolleybus services operated from 1941 until 1964, and bus traffic peaked between 1945 and 1955. In the 1960s, the Hörjel Agreement led to the creation of Storstockholms Lokaltrafik (SL) in 1967, centralising control of public transport. SL progressively took over all suburban bus companies.

Since the 1990s, SL has outsourced bus operations to private companies through contracts. The bus services have occasionally faced disruptions due to strikes, notably in 2008 and 2013.

Bus colours have evolved over time: early buses varied, but in 1929, SS standardised the livery to red. When SL assumed control in 1967, new buses continued this red theme until blue was introduced for stömlinje (trunk) routes in 1998.

== Bus routes ==
As of 2020, Stockholm County had 502 bus routes within the SL network, serving 6,710 stops. Some routes extend beyond county borders and may require additional fares. The most heavily used route, line 4, serves around 60,000 passengers daily, making it the busiest in Sweden.

Bus route numbers indicate the geographical areas they cover:

- 0–99: Stockholm City Centre, including trunk lines 1, 2, 3, 4, 5 and 6.
- 100–199: Suburban Stockholm (outside the city centre), covering Västerort and Söderort.
- 200–299: Lidingö Municipality, primarily departing from Ropsten.
- 300–399: Ekerö Municipality, with major hubs at Brommaplan and Tappström.
- 400–499: Nacka/Värmdö Municipality, mainly departing from Slussen.
- 500–599: Norrort, including Solna, Sundbyberg, Sollentuna, Järfälla, and more.
- 600–699: Roslagen, covering areas such as Danderyd, Täby, Vallentuna, and Norrtälje.
- 700–799: Southwest parts of the Stockholm County, including Huddinge, Botkyrka, Salem, and Södertälje.
- 800–899: Southeast parts of the Stockholm County, including Tyresö, Haninge, and Nynäshamn.
- 900–999: Other service lines spread throughout the county.

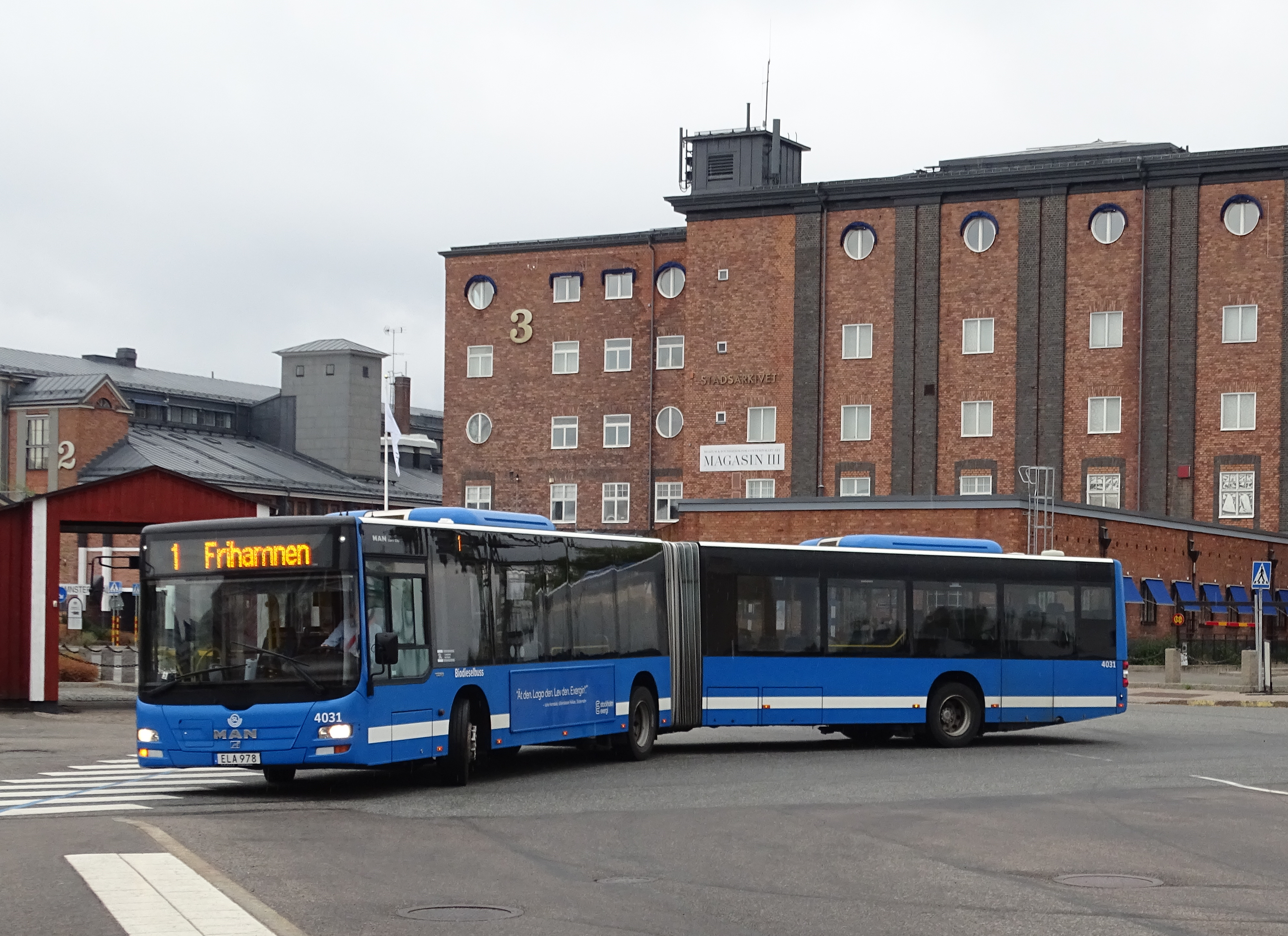
Trunk line 1 at its eastern terminus in Frihamnen.

=== Trunk bus lines ===
Trunk buses, branded as Blue Bus Lines, offer frequent services with fewer stops than standard routes. They provide vital connections to the Stockholm Metro and Stockholm commuter rail network, filling in gaps not served by rail lines and supporting cross-connections across the county.

The first trunk bus line in the city centre, line 4, began operating on 18 August 1998, using low-floor Scania buses. It replaced line 54, with some route modifications to improve speed and efficiency. Trunk services expanded further, and by 2005, all trunk lines operated with articulated buses for increased capacity.

== Electric buses ==
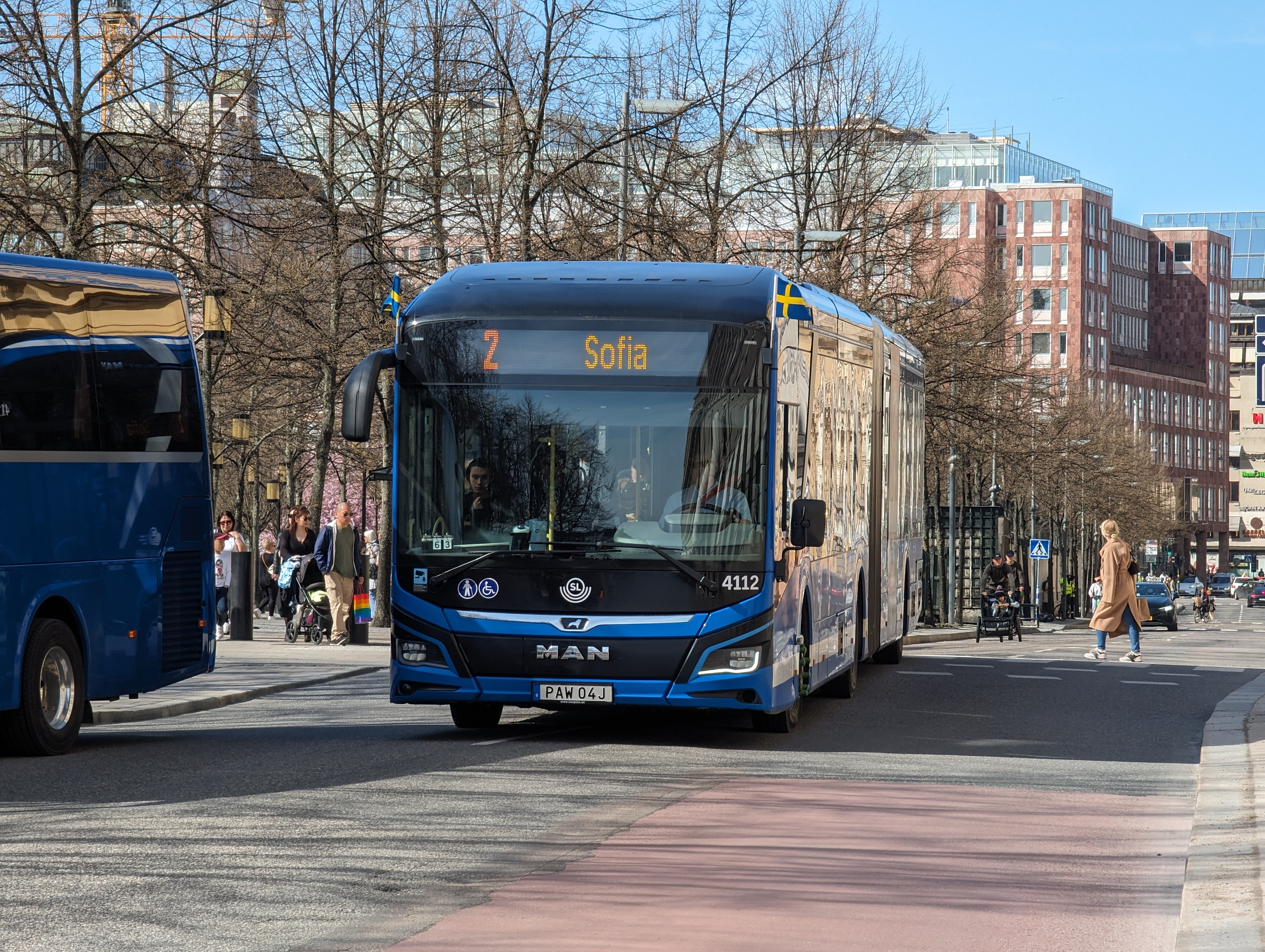
Electric bus on Line 2 in Stockholm in 2024

SL plans to electrify its entire bus fleet by 2035. Stockholm's transition toward electrifying its bus fleet began in March 2015 with the introduction of fully electric hybrid buses on Line 73. This was part of the ZeEUS project, aimed at testing emission-free urban transport solutions. In partnership with SL, Volvo Buses and Keolis, Stockholm trialled eight plug-in hybrid buses, focusing on their performance in winter conditions.

In August 2020, Stockholm launched Sweden's first fully electric Bus Rapid Transit (BRT) service in Barkarbystaden. Operated by Nobina, the BRT line uses four articulated BYD buses, reducing travel time by giving priority at intersections and using dedicated lanes. By August 2022, Stockholm's city centre saw its first fully electric buses, with 15 MAN models introduced.

In 2023 electric buses constituted only about 2% of SL's fleet. Over the next decade, SL aims to incrementally increase this proportion through new traffic agreements. Between 2024 and 2026, SL will implement seven new service contracts across several areas, including Bromma, Solna, Sundbyberg, and Sollentuna. This first phase will introduce hundreds of new electric buses, increasing their share to 50% of the total fleet by 2026. By this time, all biogas and bioethanol-powered buses will also be phased out.

The subsequent phases will see new contracts for Sigtuna, Upplands Väsby, and Ekerö in 2029, elevating the electric bus share to 60%. In 2031, further agreements covering the north-eastern Stockholm municipalities to Norrtälje will increase this to 75%. Finally, the remaining areas will transition by 2034 and 2035, achieving 100% electrification.

SL has identified several challenges that could affect the timeline, including the availability of electric buses that meet its standards, sufficient charging infrastructure, battery costs, and the need for quick-charging capabilities. External factors, such as requirements from national defence for emergency operations and supply chain delays, may also influence progress.

== See also ==
- Storstockholms Lokaltrafik (SL)
- Trams in Stockholm
- Stockholm Metro
