= Trams in Stockholm =

Tramway network in Stockholm, Sweden

Coordinates: 59°21′N 18°04′E

Stockholm tramway network
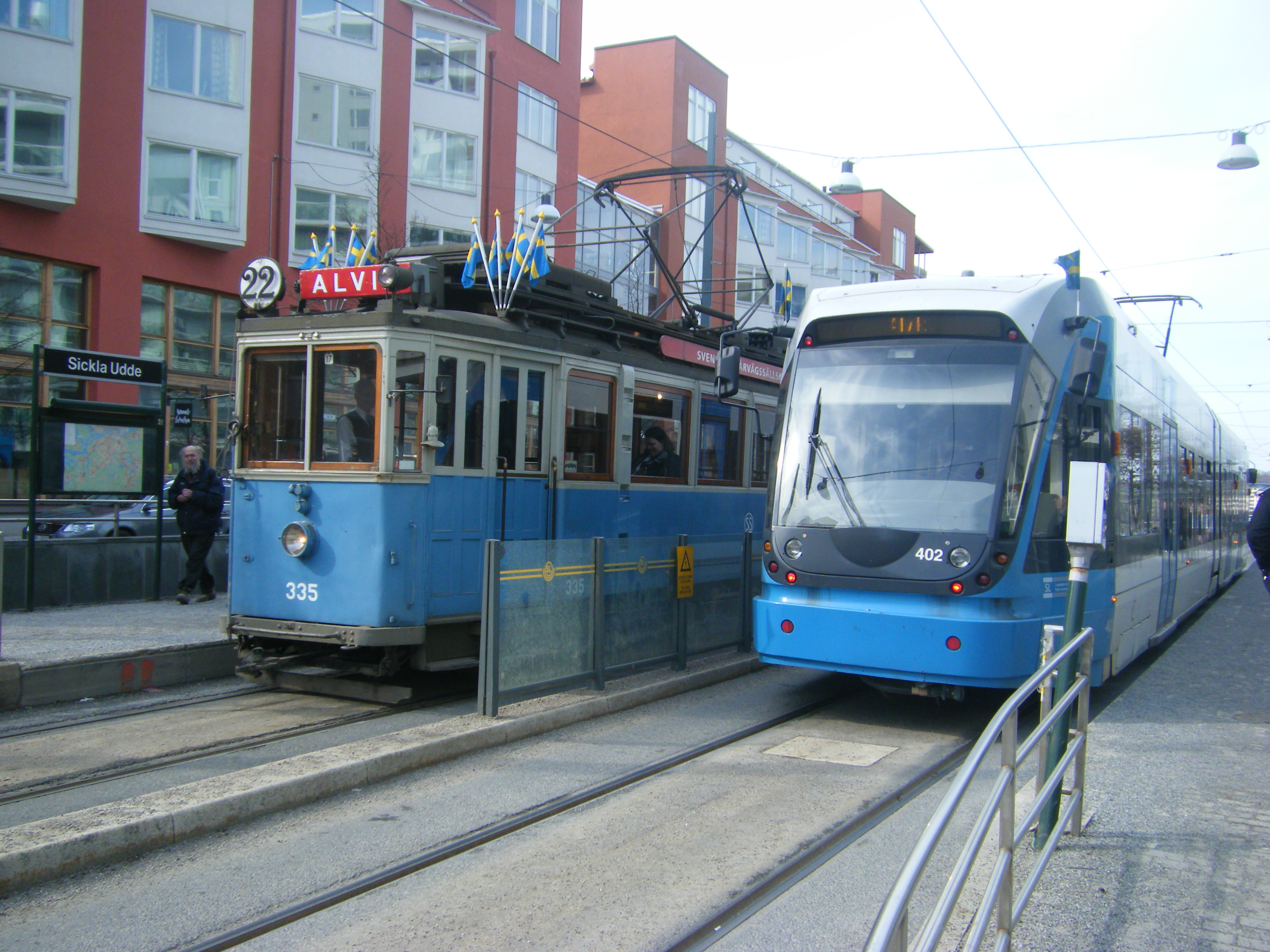
- Old and new tram on Tvärbanan, 2010.

Operation
- Locale: Stockholm, Sweden
- Status: Operational
- Routes: 4 regular 1 heritage line
- Owner: Storstockholms Lokaltrafik (Stockholm Regional Council)
- Operators: AB Stockholms Spårvägar (lines 7, 30, 31, 12& 21); Djurgårdslinjen (Museum line 7N)

Infrastructure
- Track gauge: 1,435 mm (4 ft 8 1/2 in) standard gauge
- Minimum curve radius: 17.5 m (57.4 ft) (7, 7N); 25 m (82 ft) (12, 22)
- Propulsion system: Electricity
- Electrification: 750 V DC from overhead catenary
- Stock: 194

Statistics
Horsecar era: 1877–1905
- Status: Closed
- Operators: Stockholms Nya Spårvägsaktiebolag (SNS); Stockholms Södra Spårvägsaktiebolag (SSB)
- Track gauge: 1,435 mm (4 ft 8 1/2 in) standard gauge
- Propulsion system: Horses
First electric tram era: 1901–1967/1991
- Status: Closed (urban network) /Open (suburban lines 12 & 21)
- Operators: SNS (1901–1917); SSB (1904–1918); AB Stockholms Spårvägar (SS) (1917–1966); Storstockholms Lokaltrafik (SL) (1967)
- Track gauge: 1,435 mm (4 ft 8 1/2 in) standard gauge
- Propulsion system: Electricity
Second electric tram era: since 1991
- Status: In service
- Owner: Storstockholms Lokaltrafik (Stockholm County Council)
- Operators: AB Stockholms Spårvägar (lines 7, 7N & 21); Arriva (lines 12 & 22)
- Track gauge: 1,435 mm (4 ft 8 1/2 in) standard gauge
- Propulsion system: Electricity
- Electrification: 750 V DC from overhead catenary
- Website: http://sl.se/en/Visitor/Plan-your-journey/ AB Storstockholms Lokaltrafik (in English)

The Stockholm tramway network forms part of the public transport system in Stockholm, the capital city of Sweden.

Beginning with horse trams in 1877, the Stockholm tram network reached its largest extent in 1946. Many of the former suburban tram lines became parts of the Stockholm Metro between the years 1950-1964. In September 1967, in conjunction with the Swedish switch from left-hand to right-hand traffic, the last parts of the once large inner city street running tram network were closed. What little remained of the former network following 1967 were isolated suburban feeder lines to the Metro.

However, in 1991 a 3 km (1.9 mi) long heritage line opened to the recreational area Djurgården; and in 2000, the non-radial half-circle line Tvärbanan opened with articulated low floor vehicles connecting an inner ring of Metro and commuter rail stations just outside the inner city proper, with subsequent extensions in 2003 and 2014; and in 2010 the heritage line was extended and converted to a regular service line.

== History ==
The first tramway in Stockholm was opened on 10 July 1877 and was drawn by horses.

Up until 1917, the city's tram lines were maintained by two separate corporations. Stockholms Nya Spårvägs AB was serving the more densely populated and affluent areas of Norrmalm and Östermalm, while Stockholms Södra Spårvägs AB was serving the poorer and sparser Södermalm. In 1917, these corporations were merged, and in 1922, their tram lines were connected at Slussen.

A tramline run on steam-power opened in 1887. Stockholm's tram network was converted to electrical propulsion 1901-1905. An extensive network formed in the early 20th century. Trams were effectively replaced by the Stockholm Metro from 1950 onwards, and most tram lines were closed down by September 1967 due to the effect of Dagen H and replaced with buses (especially those in Stockholm proper), with the exception of two suburban tram lines, Lidingöbanan and Nockebybanan.

In 1991, one tram line, Djurgårdslinjen, was reopened as a heritage and tourist line. Since 2000, two more tram lines have been built, Tvärbanan (line 30 – formerly 22), a peripheral line linking the southeastern suburb of Sickla with the northwestern suburb of Solna, and an extension of Djurgårdslinjen into the inner city Spårväg City (line 7). The Tvärbana was extended in 2013, and will be further extended in the future. In 2018, Stockholm won the European Tramdriver Championship.

== Current service ==
As of January 2023, the following lines provide service in the Stockholm metropolitan area:

Line	Name	Length	Stations	Route	Type
7	Spårväg City	3.5 km (2.2 mi)	11	T-Centralen – Waldemarsudde/Bellmansro	Tram
7N	Djurgårdslinjen	2.9 km (1.8 mi)	10	Norrmalmstorg – Waldemarsudde/Bellmansro	Heritage tramline
12	Nockebybanan	5.6 km (3.5 mi)	10	Nockeby – Alvik	Light rail
21	Lidingöbanan	9.2 km (5.7 mi)	14	Ropsten – Gåshaga brygga	Light rail
30	Tvärbanan	18.2 km (11.3 mi)	25	Solna railway station – Sickla	Light rail
31	Tvärbanan	4.1 km (2.5 mi)	6	Bromma Flygplats – Alviks Strand	Light rail

While all tramlines run on standard gauge track and use the same overhead voltage (750 V DC), the cab signalling system for Lidingöbanan is different from the one for Tvärbanan, making rolling stock incompatible. The other tramlines (Nockeby and City/Djurgården) have no cab signalling requirement.

The trams have depots and garages at Ulvsunda for Tvärbanan, at Alvik for Nockebybanan, at Djurgården for the City/Djurgården line, and at Larsberg for Lidingöbanan.

== Gallery ==
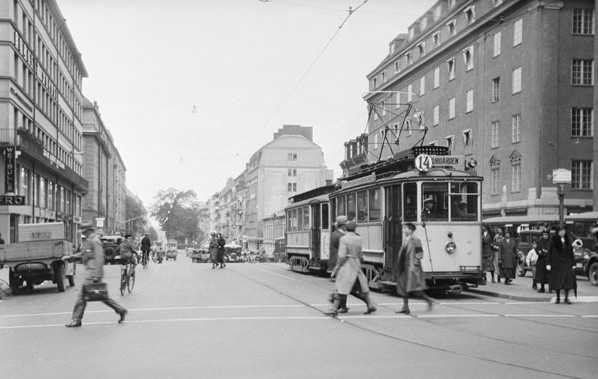
Line 14 (1931) on Sveavägen

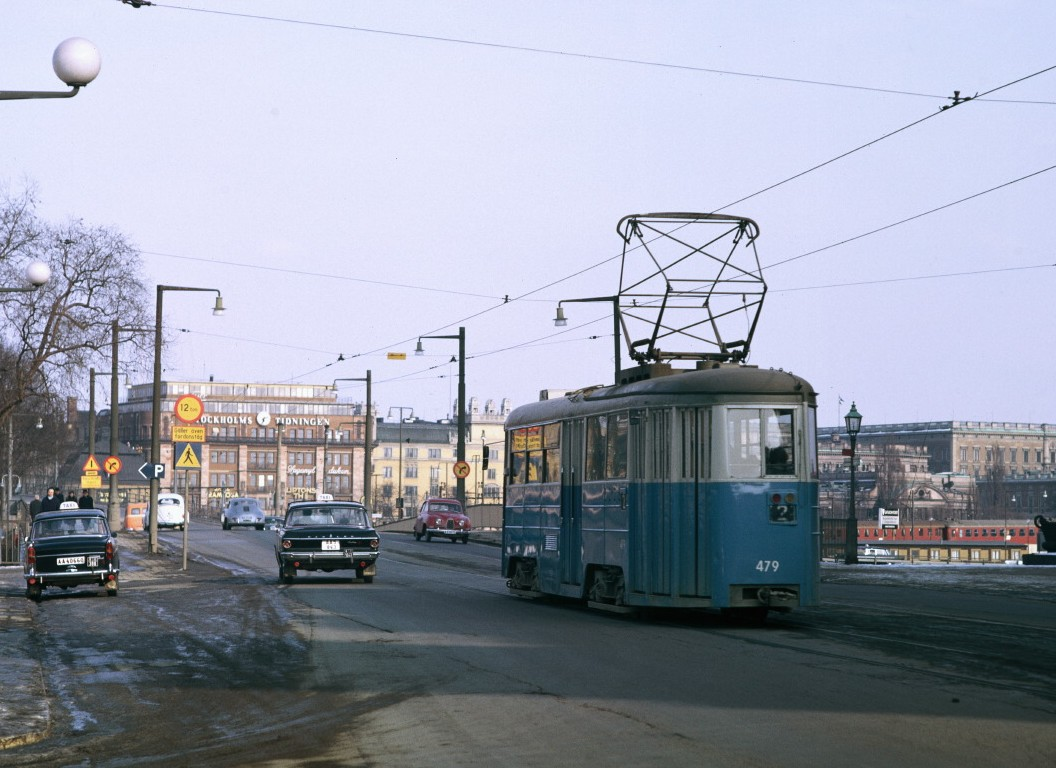
Line 2 (1963) near Stockholm City Hall

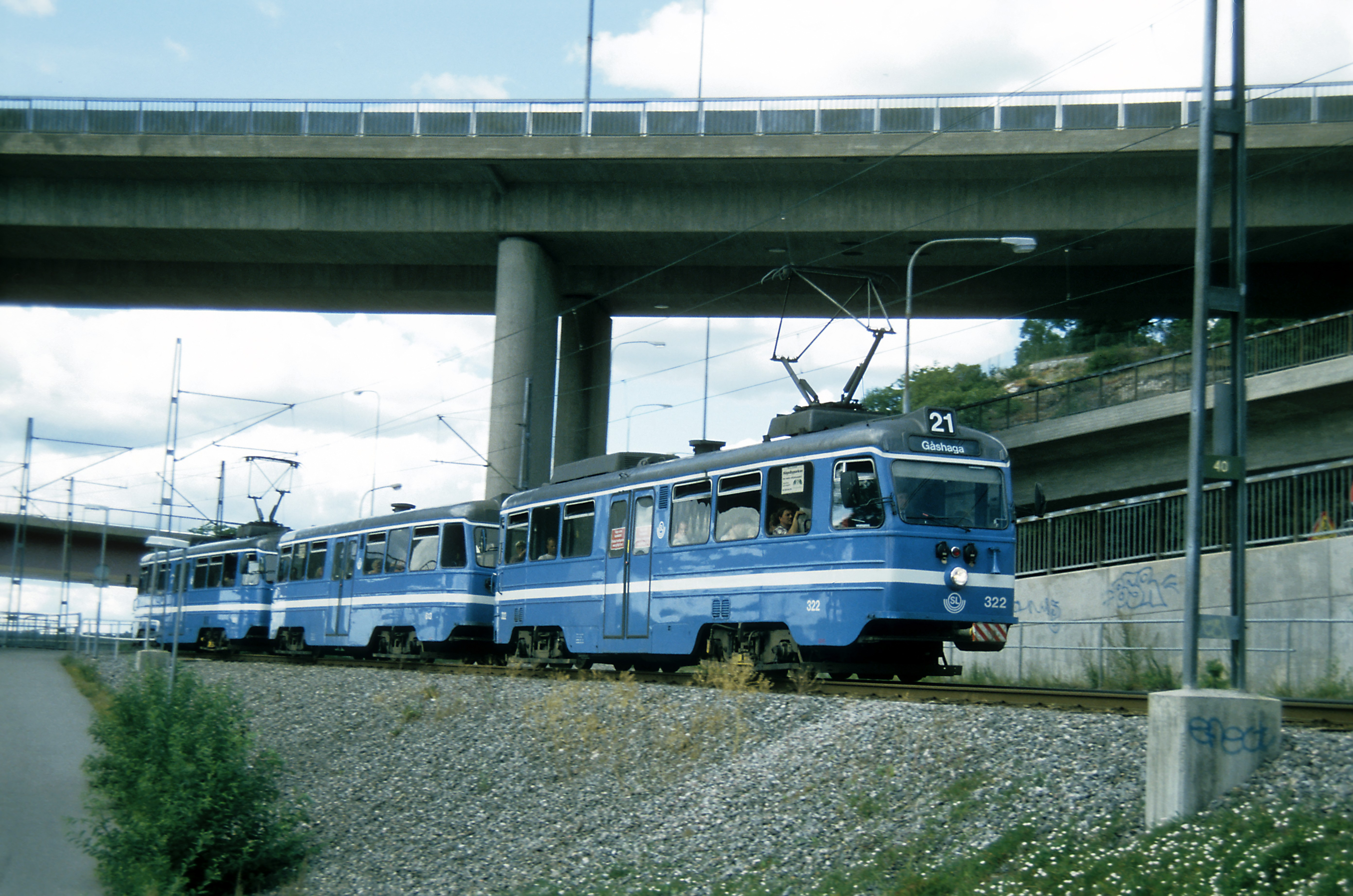
Older tram at Lidingöbanan (1996)

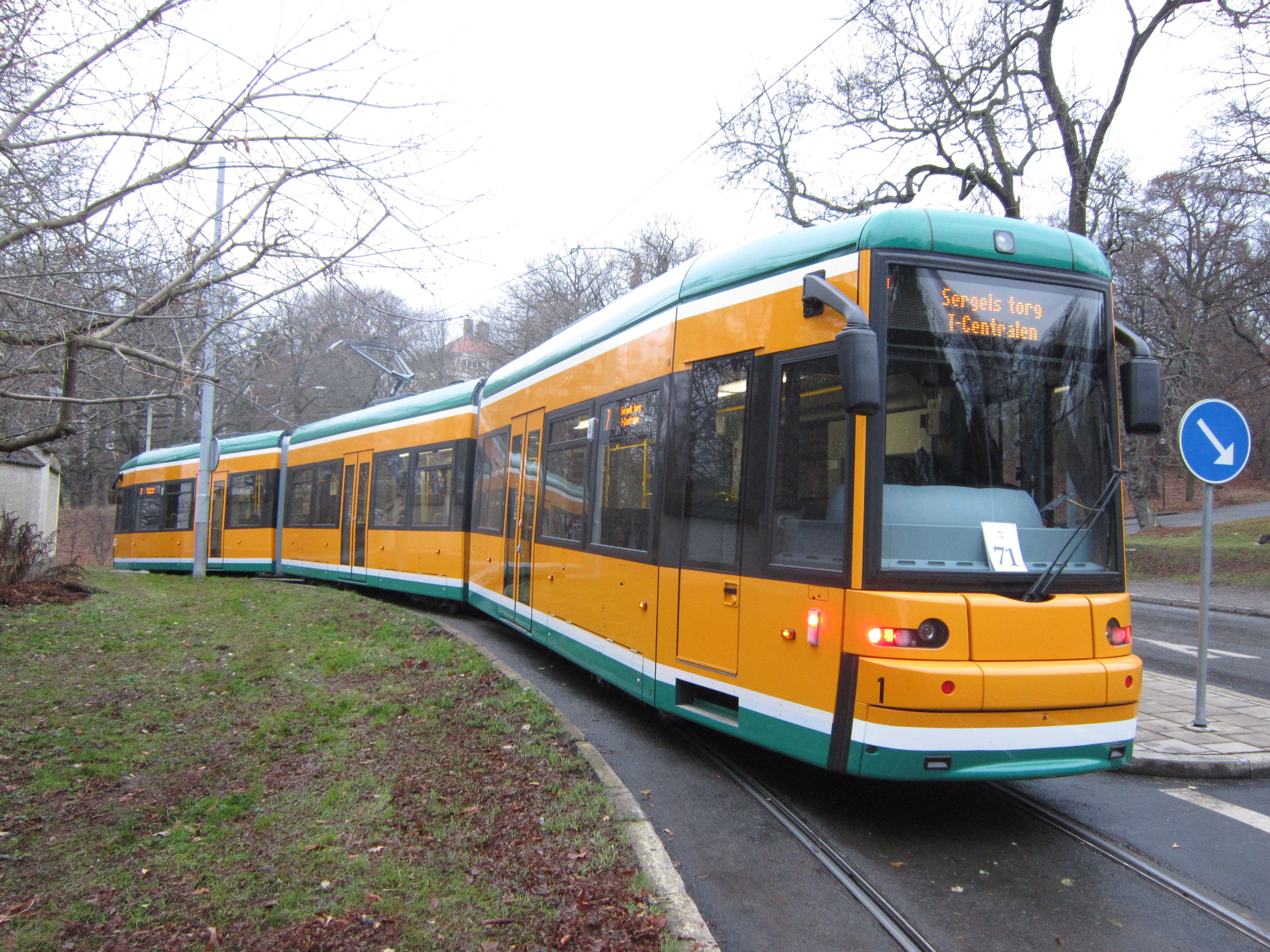
Modern A34 tram at Spårväg City (2011)

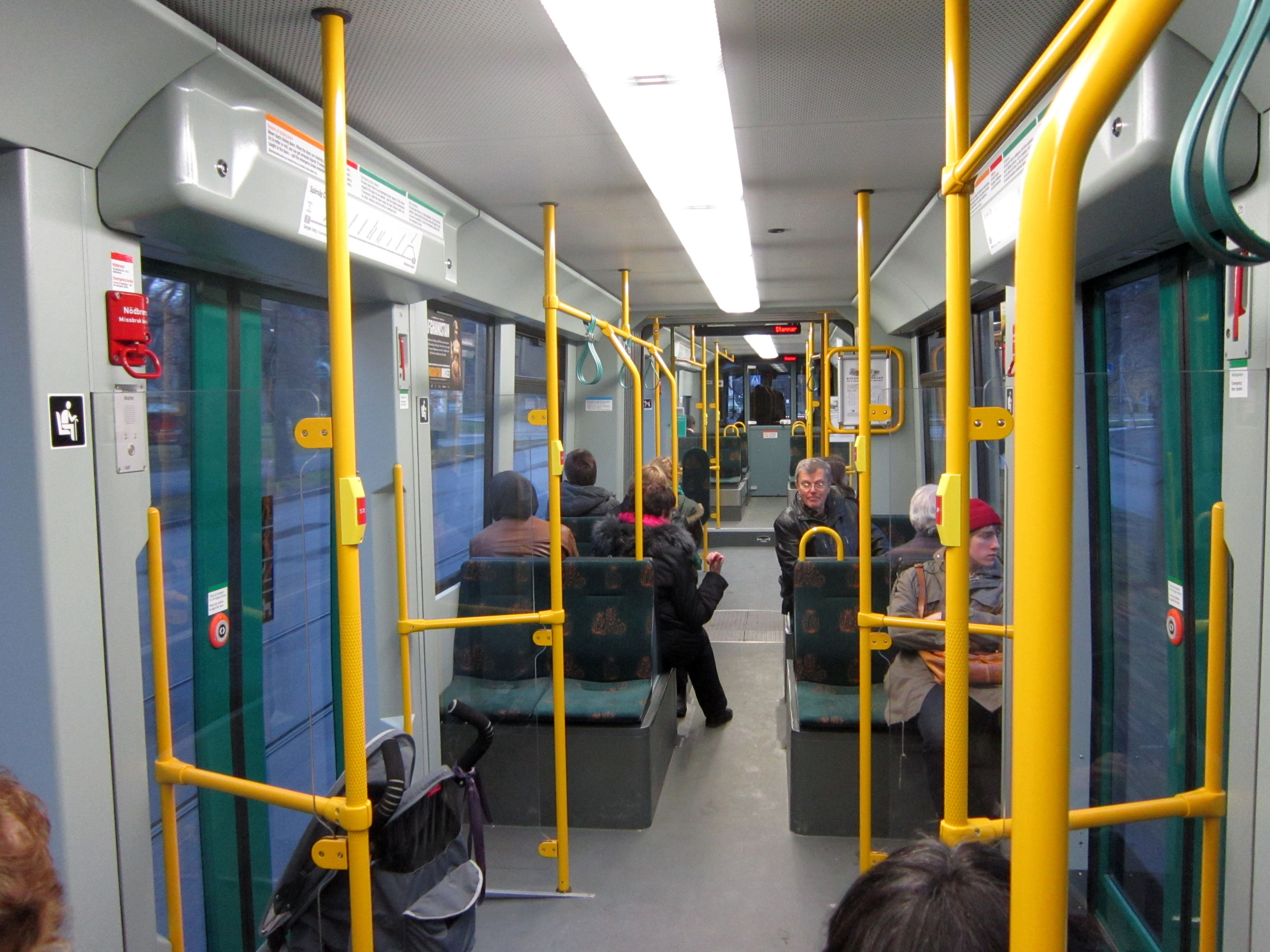
Interior of an A34 tram

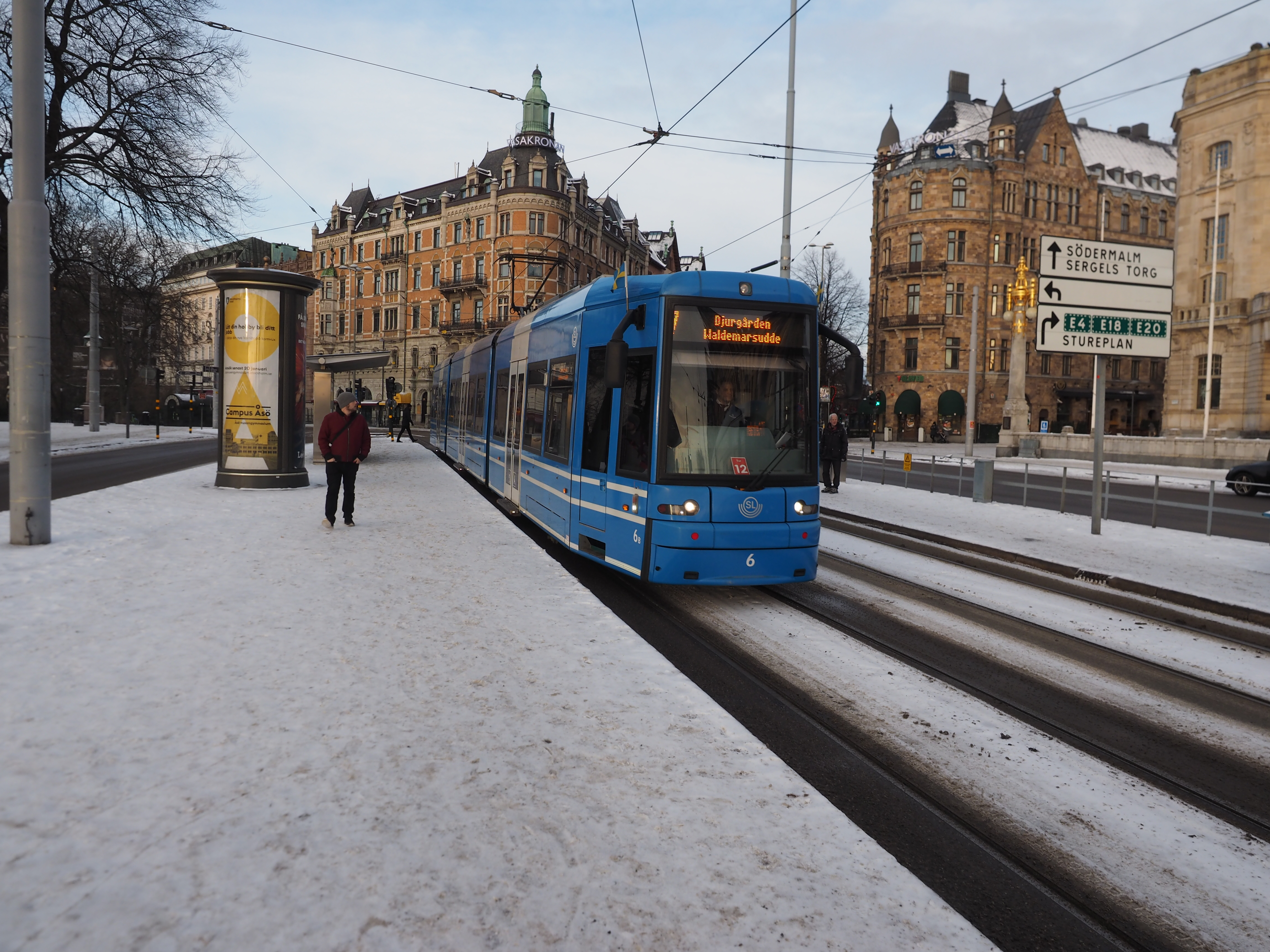
Modern tram on line 7 in the city centre

== See also ==
- Stockholm Metro
- Public transport in Stockholm
- List of town tramway systems in Europe
