= Swedish Tramway Society =

- Svenska Spårvägssällskapet (Swedish)
- Logo
- Abbreviation: SSS
- Established: 1959; 67 years ago
- Type: Nonprofit

The Swedish Tramway Society (Swedish: Svenska Spårvägssällskapet) is a nonprofit association for preserving local history of public transport. Founded in 1959 as the Stockholm Tramway Society (Swedish: Stockholms Spårvägssällskap), the association was later renamed as members joined from all parts of Sweden. The association is organized in eight local chapters.

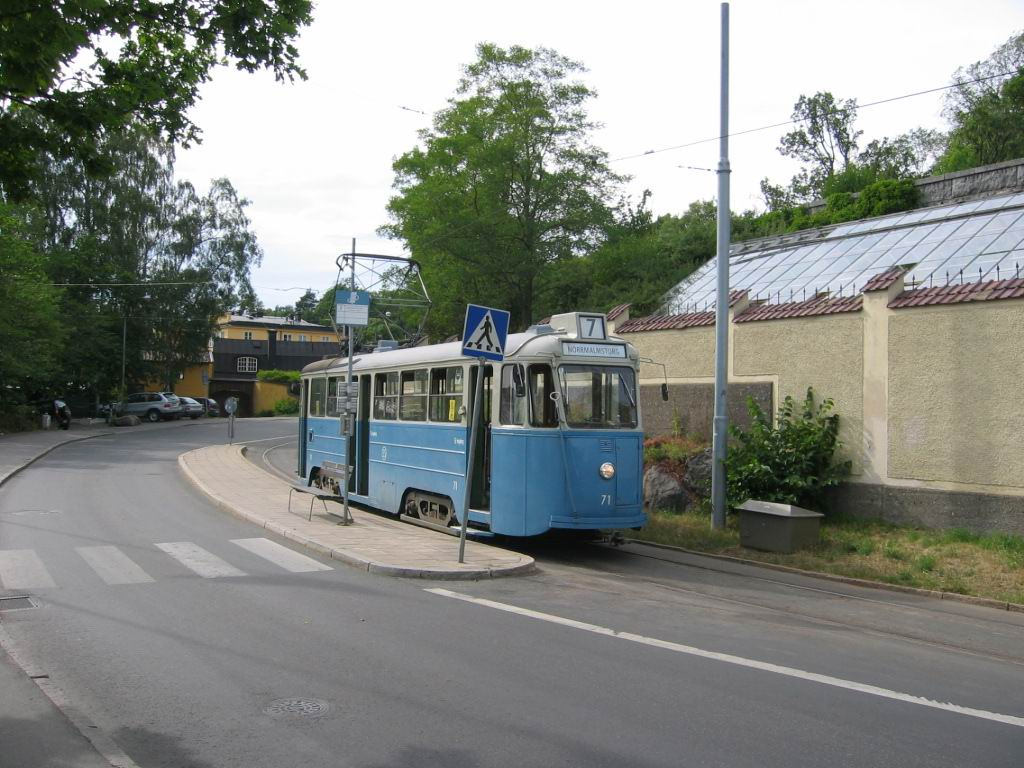
SSS tram train at Djurgården in Stockholm

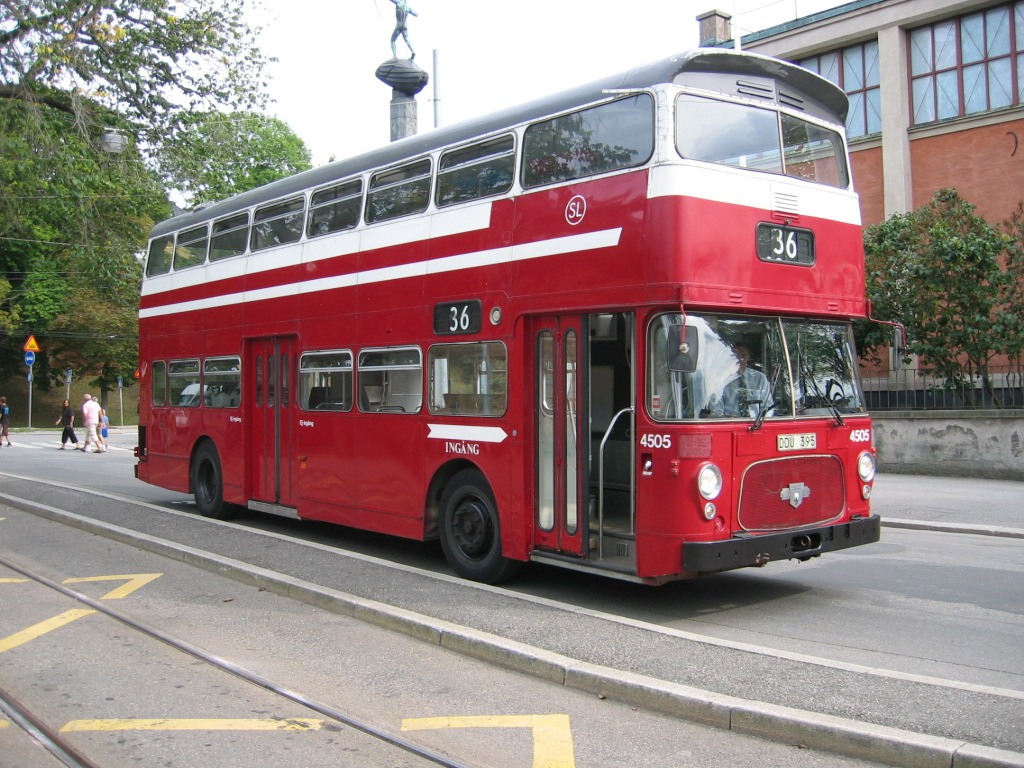
SSS bus at Djurgården in Stockholm

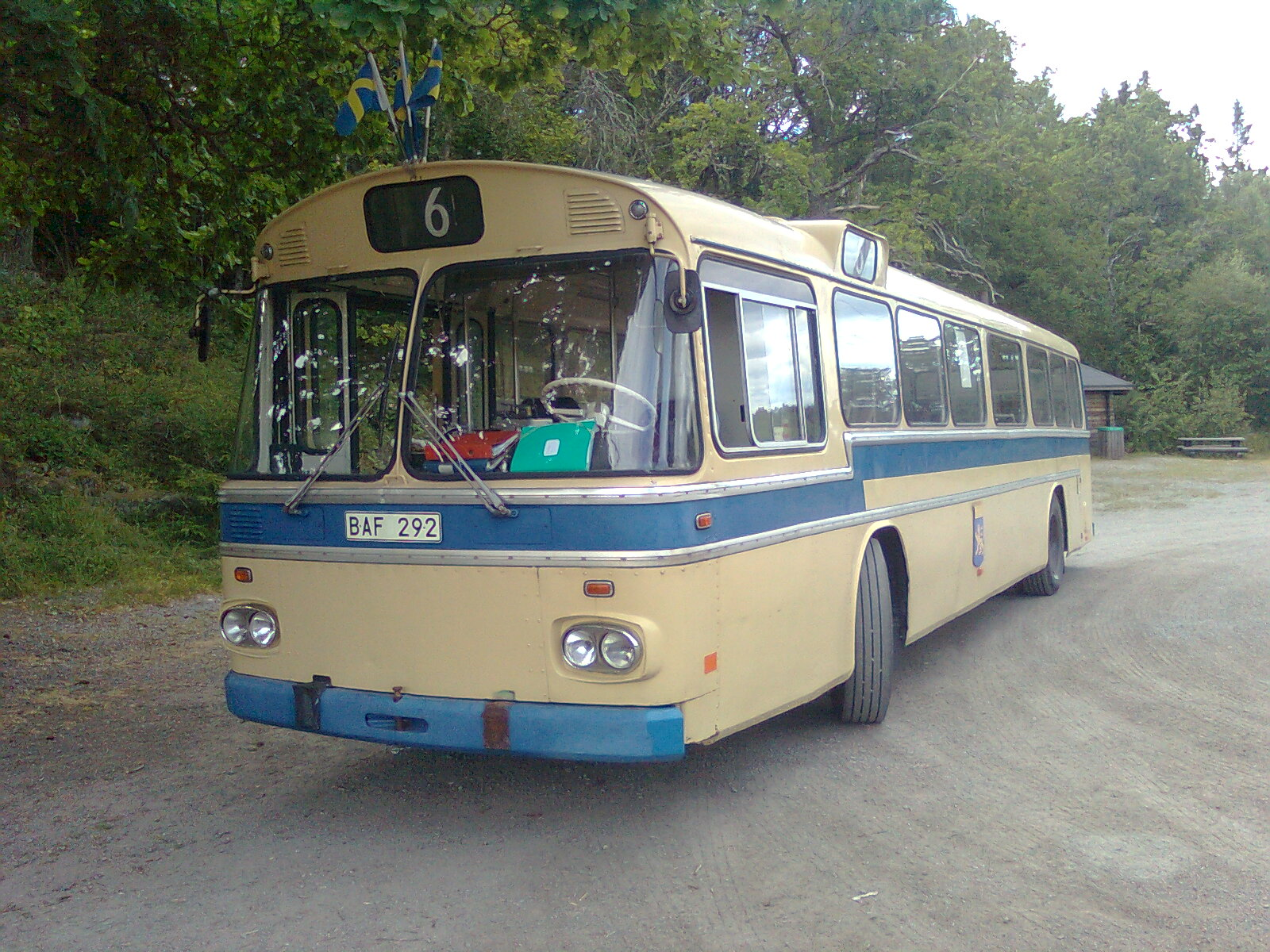
Former Uppsala stads trafik bus in Fjällnora near Uppsala.

The association publishes six issues per year of its member magazine MFSS (Meddelanden Från Svenska Spårvägssällskapet) and the independent trade magazine Modern stadstrafik.

The association operates the Swedish Urban Transport Museum in Malmköping and in Stockholm they previously owned AB Stockholm Spårvägar (SS), a company that operates several tramways in the Stockholm area including the heritage streetcar Djurgårdslinjen. The association also runs a heritage streetcar in Malmö.

The official site of the Swedish Tramway Society claims to be the largest website in the Nordic region for urban transport enthusiasts.
