= Stockholms Spårvägar =

Swedish public transport company

AB Stockholms Spårvägar

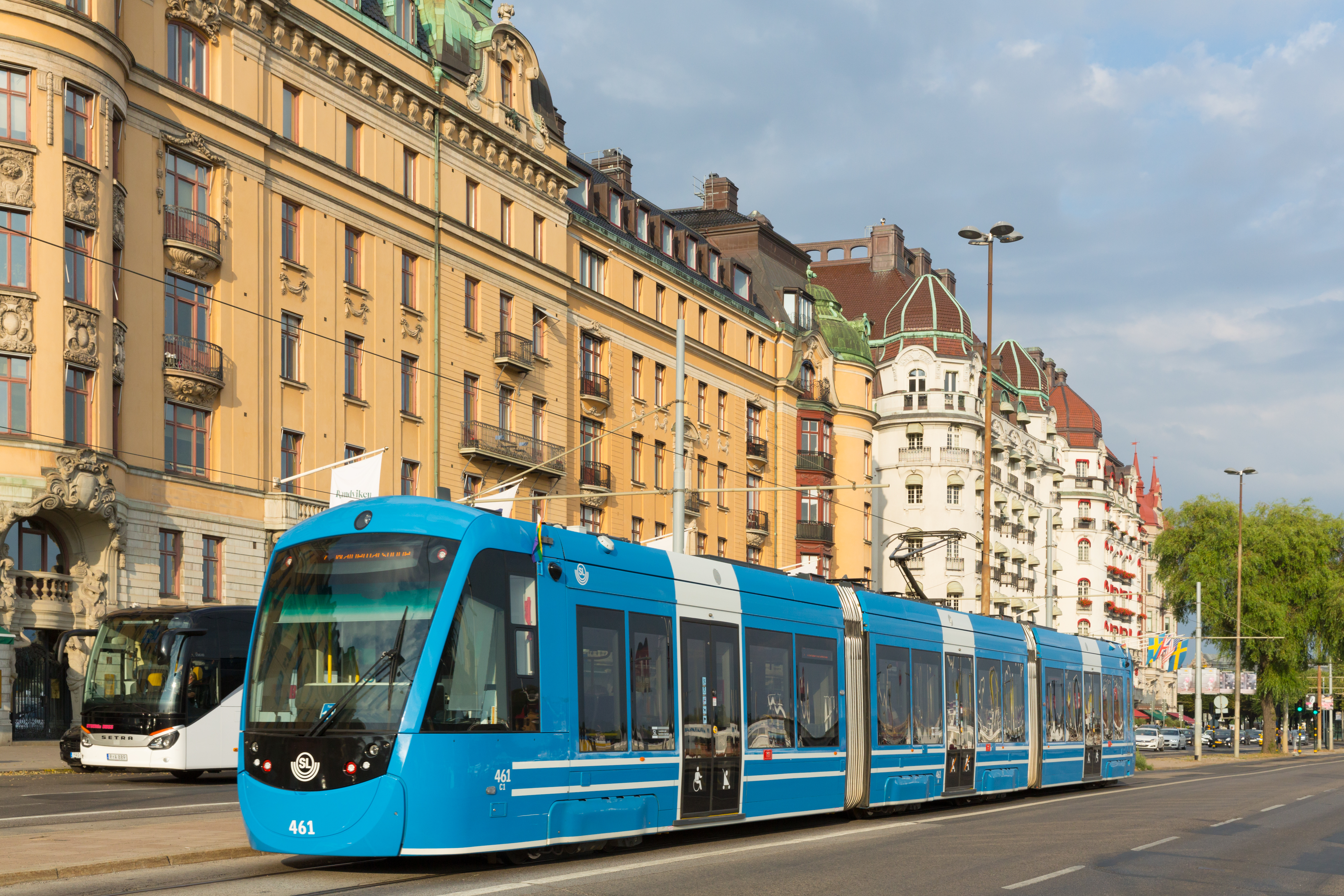
- A tram operated by SS on the Djurgårdslinjen
- Company type: Aktiebolag (Limited company)
- Industry: Rail and tram operations
- Founded: 1987; 38 years ago in Stockholm, Sweden
- Founder: Svenska Spårvägssällskapet
- Headquarters: Stockholm, Sweden
- Key people: Per Thorsell (chairman of the board) Göran Bergström (chief executive officer)
- Owner: Bergkvara
- Number of employees: 500 (2023)
- Parent: Cube Infrastructure Managers
- Website: www.ss.se

Stockholms Spårvägar (lit. 'Stockholm Tramways', abbreviated SS) is a Swedish public transport company that is contracted to operate various tram and rail services in the Stockholm area. Founded in 1987 by the Svenska Spårvägssällskapet (the Swedish Tramway Society), the company initially focused on heritage tram operations along the Djurgårdslinjen. Over the years, it has expanded its operations to include modern tram services under contract with Storstockholms Lokaltrafik (SL).

In July 2022, Stockholms Spårvägar became a subsidiary of Bergkvara, which is in turn owned by Luxembourg-based Cube Infrastructure Managers. The company employs over 500 staff members and operates four modern tram lines as well as heritage tram services.

== History ==
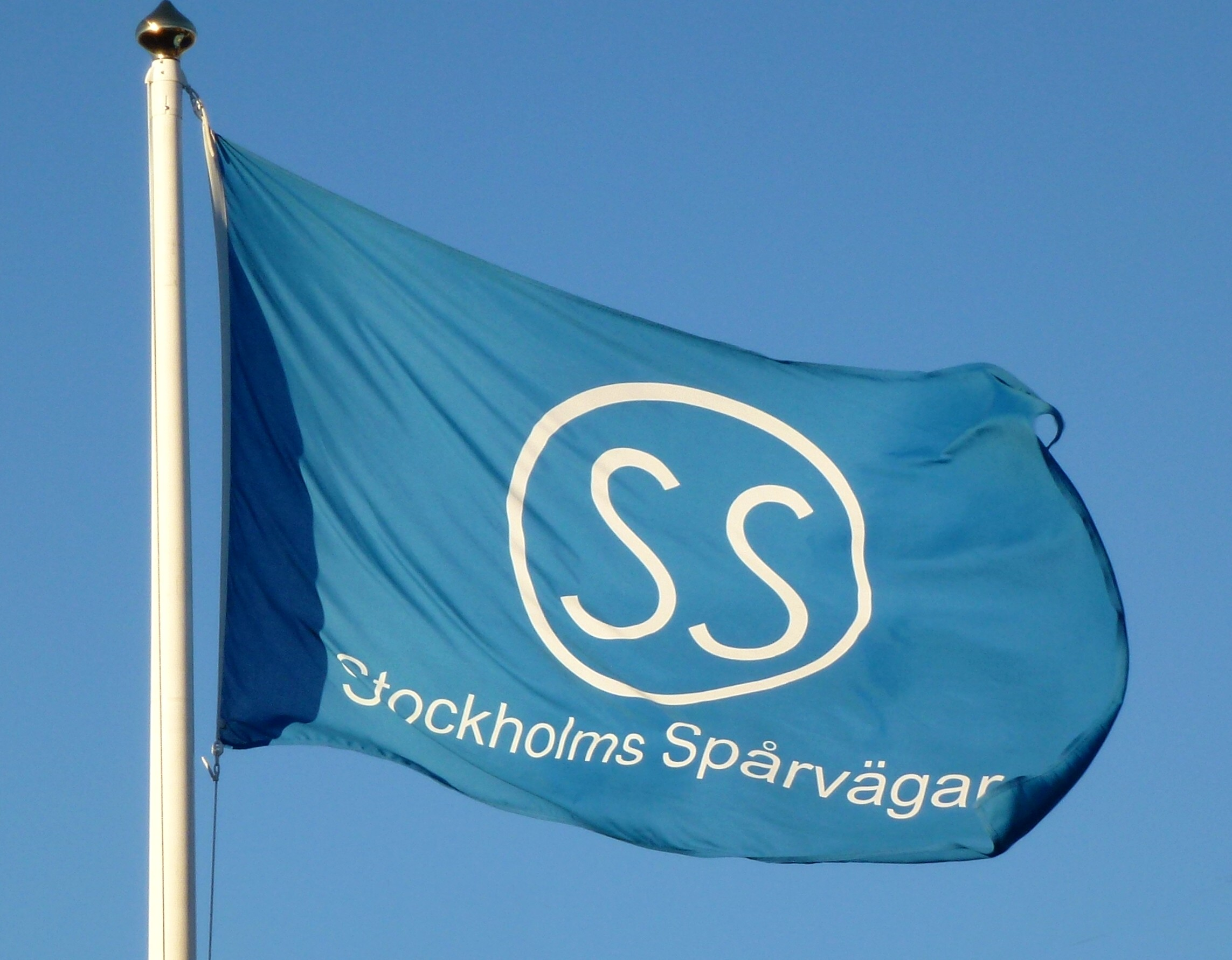
Former logo

=== Former company ===
The name "AB Stockholms Spårvägar" originates from the former AB Stockholms Spårvägar, established in 1916, which became Storstockholms Lokaltrafik (SL) in 1967.

=== As a heritage tram operator ===
In 1987, the modern AB Stockholms Spårvägar was founded by the Stockholm branch of the Swedish Tramway Society to support plans for a heritage tramway on Djurgården. SL permitted the use of its former name and logo. The heritage tramway, Djurgårdslinjen, commenced service in June 1991 between Norrmalmstorg and Waldemarsudde, operated by volunteers with Stockholms Spårvägar as the formal operator.

=== As a public transport operator ===
In 2010, SL directly awarded Stockholms Spårvägar a contract to operate Spårväg City, a new modern tramway. The company began regular operations on 23 August 2010, and the contract was later extended until 2014. In April 2014, Stockholms Spårvägar won a competitive bid to operate Spårväg City and the Lidingöbanan for eight years, with an option for a four-year extension.

In 2023, the company was awarded a new ten-year contract to manage additional lines, including the Tvärbanan, Nockebybanan, and Saltsjöbanan, along with an extension of its existing contracts for Spårväg City and Lidingöbanan. The contract, valued at 5.6–6.6 billion SEK, commenced on 15 December 2024. This agreement encompasses traffic planning, maintenance of SL's vehicles, depots, and stops, as well as certain track infrastructure.

== Operations ==
Stockholms Spårvägar now operates the majority of local and light-rail services in Stockholm County on behalf of SL:

- Spårväg City
- Lidingöbanan
- Tvärbanan
- Nockebybanan
- Saltsjöbanan

In addition to its modern services, the company continues to operate heritage tram traffic on the Djurgårdslinjen. Its depots are located at Djurgården, Lidingö, Ulvsunda, and Neglinge, where SS maintains vehicles, and manage staff operations. The company also supports youth initiatives, providing training opportunities through a partnership with its former owner, Svenska Spårvägssällskapet.

== Gallery ==
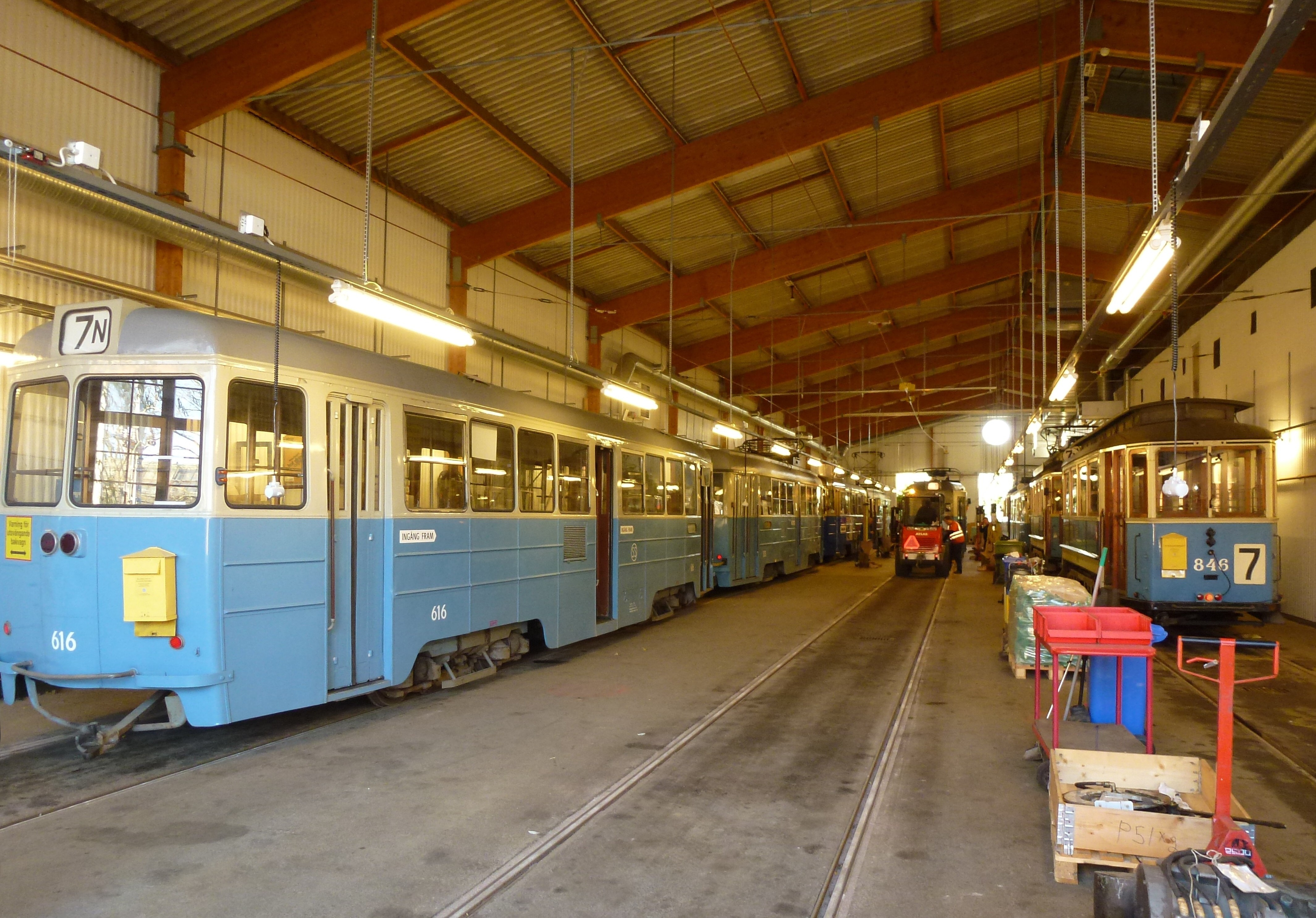
Historic trams at the Djurgården depot

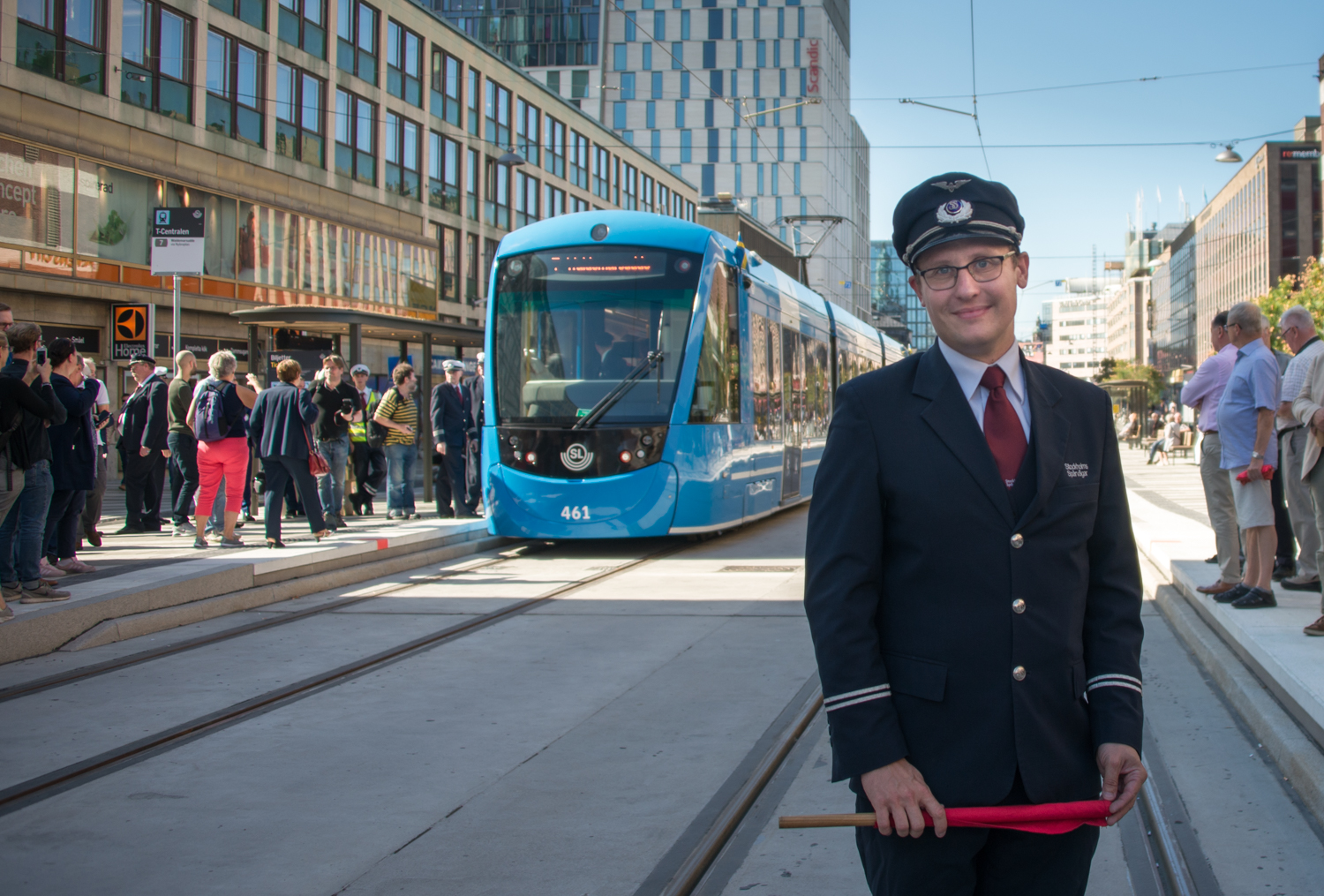
Spårväg City inauguration in 2018

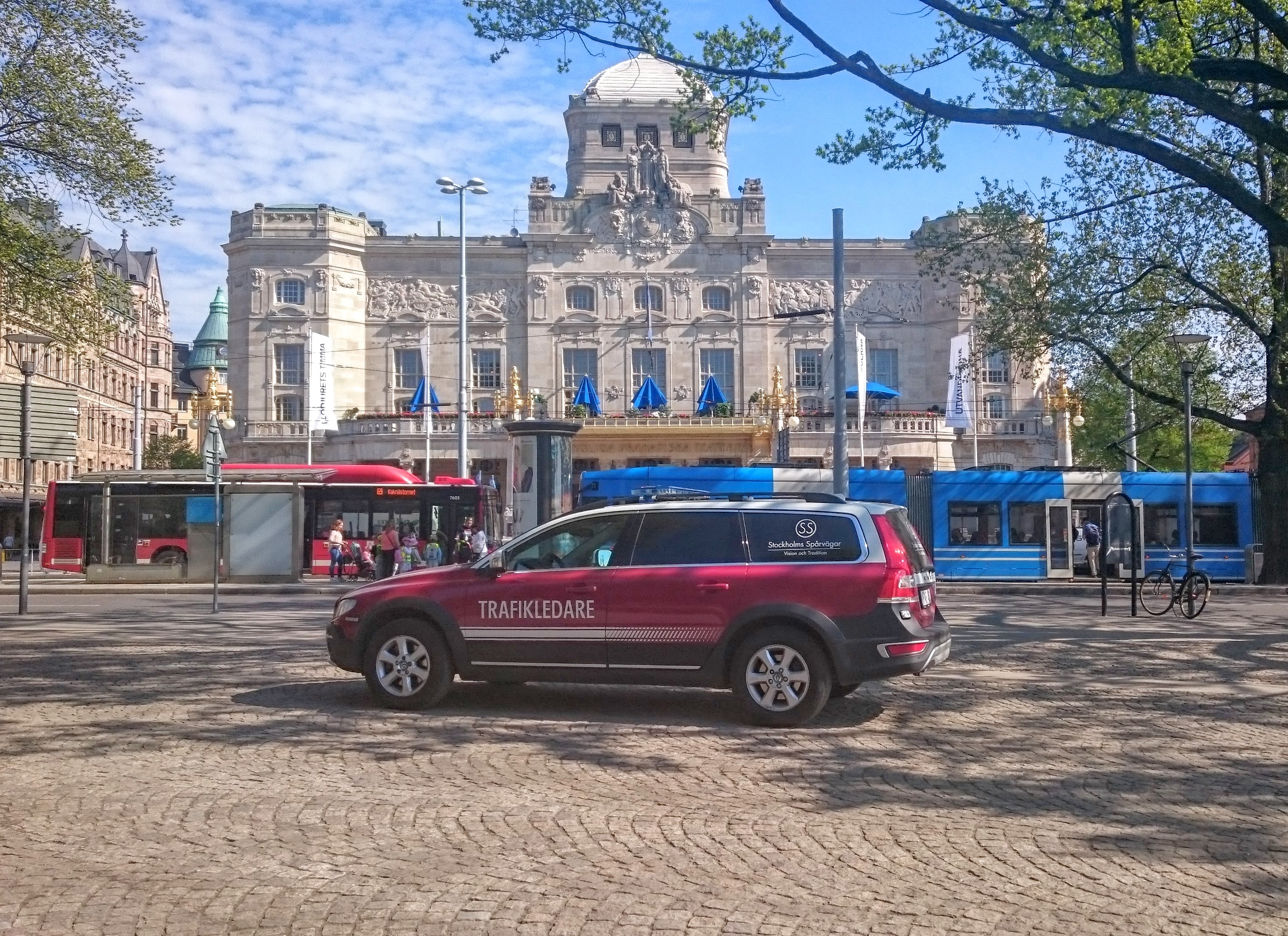
Traffic management vehicle

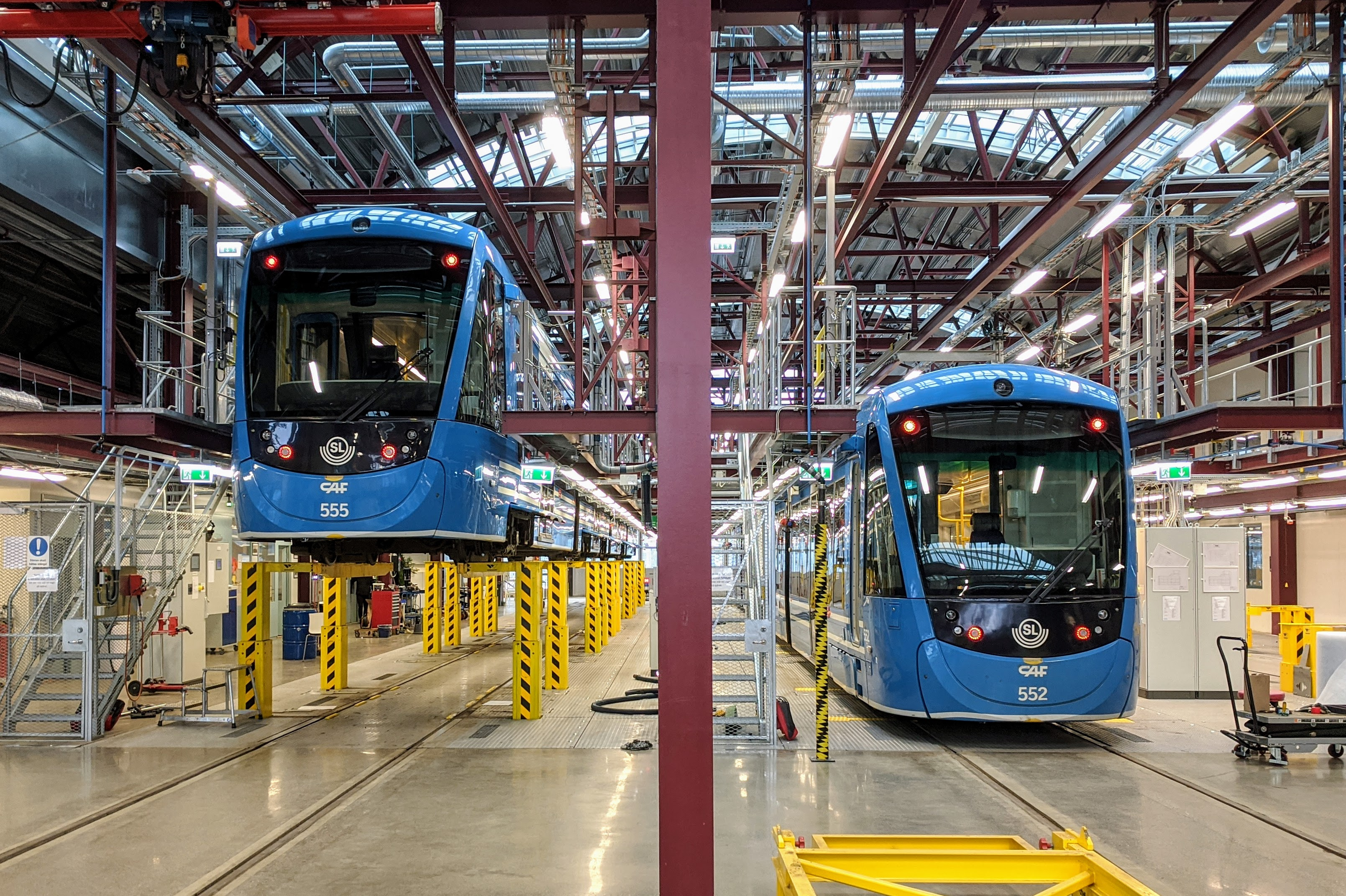
Lidingöbanan depot

== See also ==
- Djurgårdslinjen
- Spårväg City
- Public transport in Stockholm
