= Stockholms Spårvägar (1915) =

AB Stockholms Spårvägar
- Trade name: SS
- Company type: Aktiebolag
- Founded: 1915
- Successor: SL (1967)
- Headquarters: Stockholm, Sweden
- Products: Public Transport

AB Stockholms Spårvägar (lit. 'Stockholm Tramways', SS) was a public transport company in Stockholm, Sweden. Founded in 1915, it was owned by the City of Stockholm to coordinate and operate public transport within the city. In 1967 the public transport in the entire Stockholm County was coordinated and the company changed its name to Storstockholms Lokaltrafik (SL) and its ownership was transferred to the Stockholm County Council.

== Overview ==
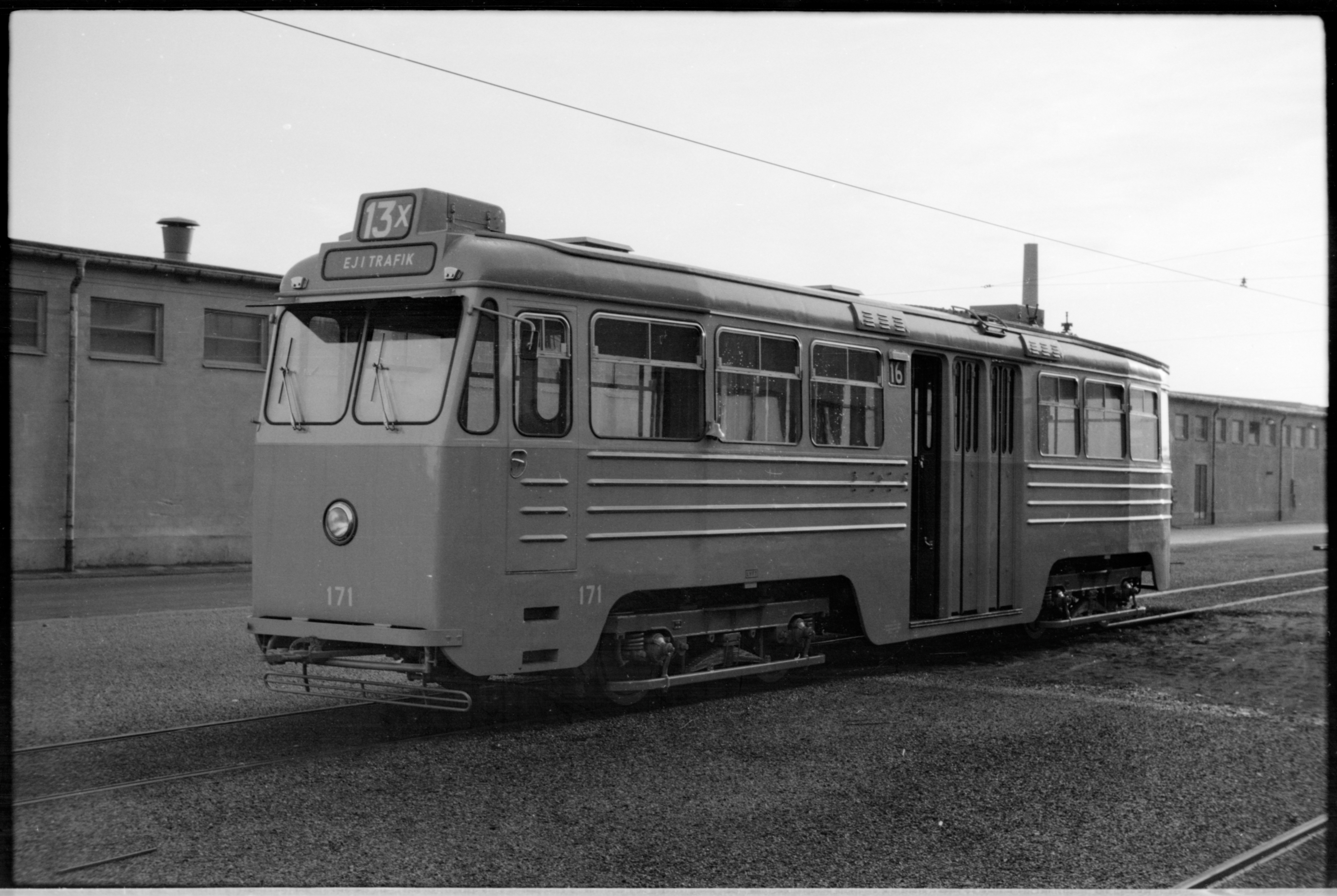
SS A29 tram in 1955

Traffic with horse-drawn trams began in 1877 with the privately owned Stockholms Nya Spårvägsaktiebolag (lit. Stockholm's New Tramway Company, SNS) and it gained a concession to operate trams on the streets of Stockholm for 40 years. Largely due to geographic factors, its traffic never extended south of Slussen, although they had the option to do so. Another company, Stockholms Södra Spårvägsaktiebolag (lit. Stockholm's Southern Tramway Company, SSB) was started to provide tramway traffic on Södermalm.

The city-owned AB Stockholms Spårvägar was created in 1915 with the aim to coordinate and making the two separate networks more efficient. The SNS network was taken over in 1917 and SSB would follow in 1918. Although the two networks had merged they would not be connected until 1922.

The opening of Västerbron in 1935 caused a major rework of the tram and bus lines when passage through Gamla Stan no longer was mandatory when travelling from Södermalm to Kungsholmen. The first underground parts of the Stockholm Metro opened in 1933 on the stretch from Skanstull to Slussen, although it would be trafficked by suburban trams gaining electricity from overhead wires until special metro vehicles was introduced in 1950 which collected its power from a third rail.

In addition to trams, motorbuses and the metro, SS once operated a large trolleybus system from 1941 until 1964. The Stockholm City Council decided in 1957 to suspend the tramway and the last five lines (4, 6, 7, 8 and 10) that remained in the City Centre were closed in conjunction with the switch to right-hand side traffic in September 1967.

The company changed its name from January 1, 1967, to AB Storstockholms Lokaltrafik and is today responsible for public transport in Stockholm County.

=== Modern Stockholms Spårvägar ===
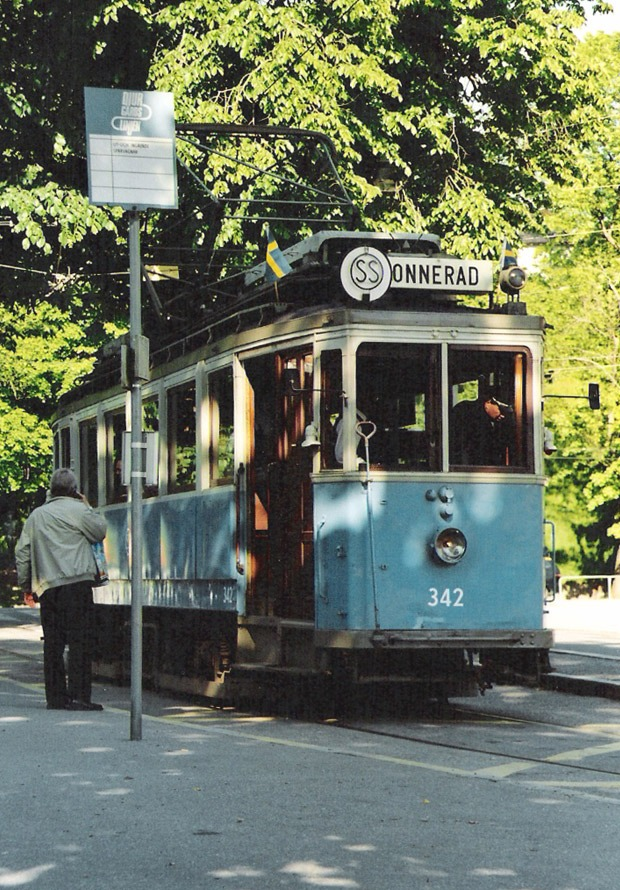
Historic A12 tramcar on the newborn Djurgårdslinjen

In 1987 a new company with the name AB Stockholms Spårvägar was created by the Swedish Tramway Society to take care of the traffic on the then forthcoming Djurgårdslinjen. Storstockholms Lokaltrafik accepted the re-use of its old name and logo.

== See also ==
- Public transport in Stockholm
- Stockholm Metro
- Trams in Stockholm
