= Spårväg City =

Tram line in central Stockholm, Sweden

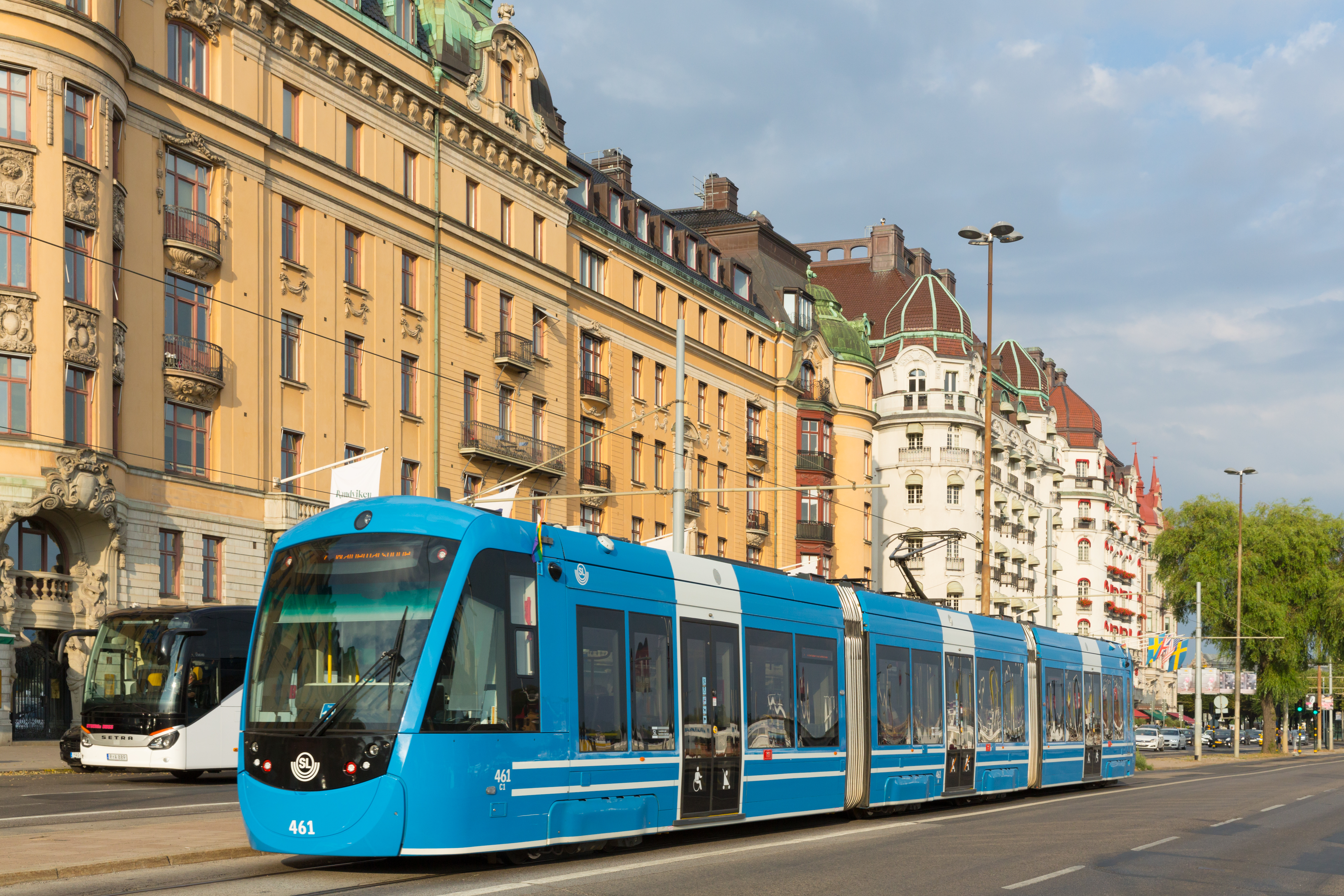
- A35 tram on Strandvägen

Overview
- Status: Operational
- Owner: Storstockholms Lokaltrafik
- Locale: Stockholm, Sweden
- Termini: T-Centralen; Waldemarsudde
- Stations: 11

Service
- Type: Tram
- Services: 1
- Operator: Stockholms Spårvägar

History
- Opened: 21 August 2010; 16 years ago

Technical
- Line length: 3.6 km (2.2 mi)
- Track gauge: 1,435 mm (4 ft 8+1/2 in) standard gauge
- Electrification: 750 V DC overhead lines

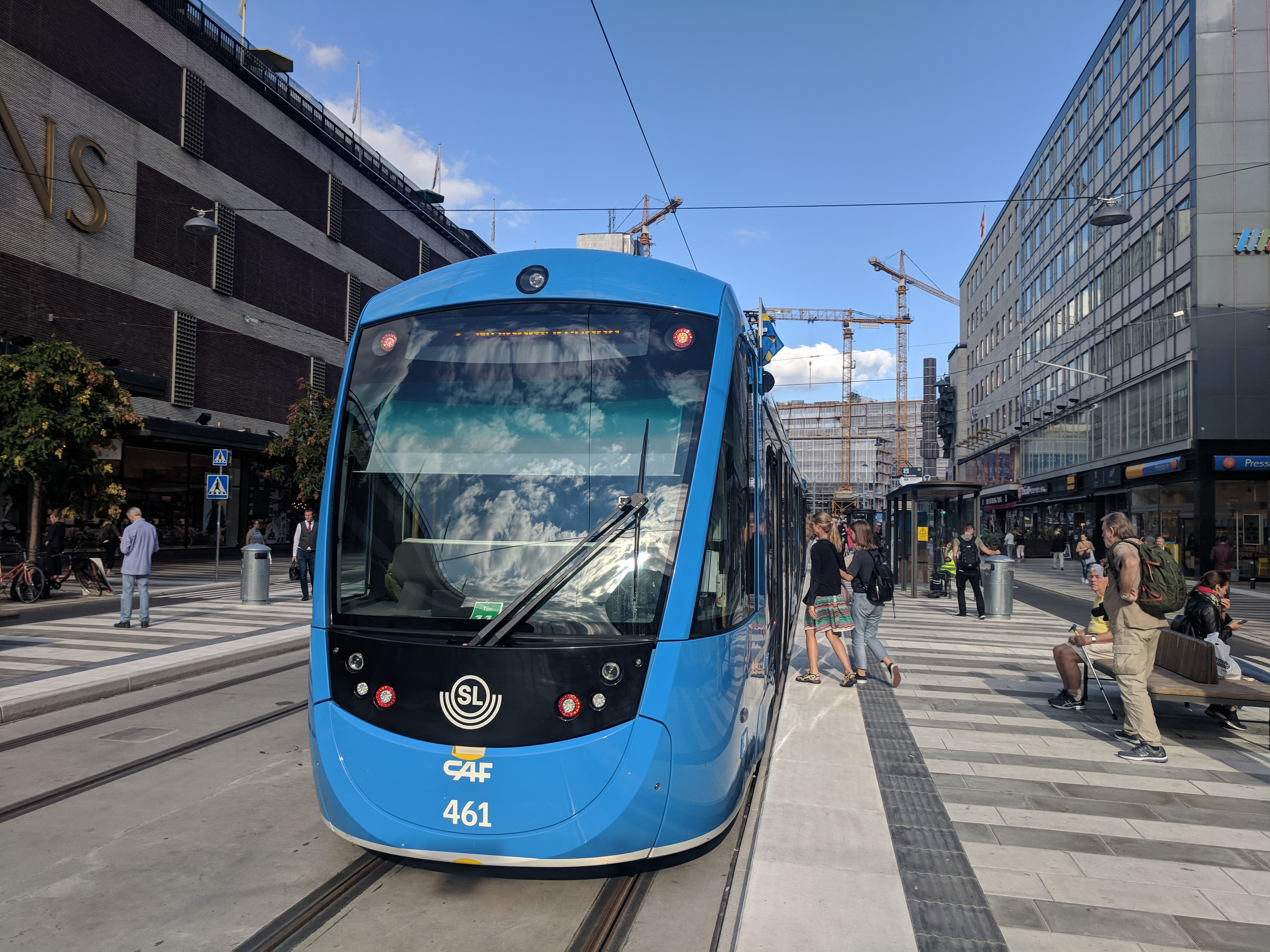
An A35 CAF Urbos tram at T–Centralen

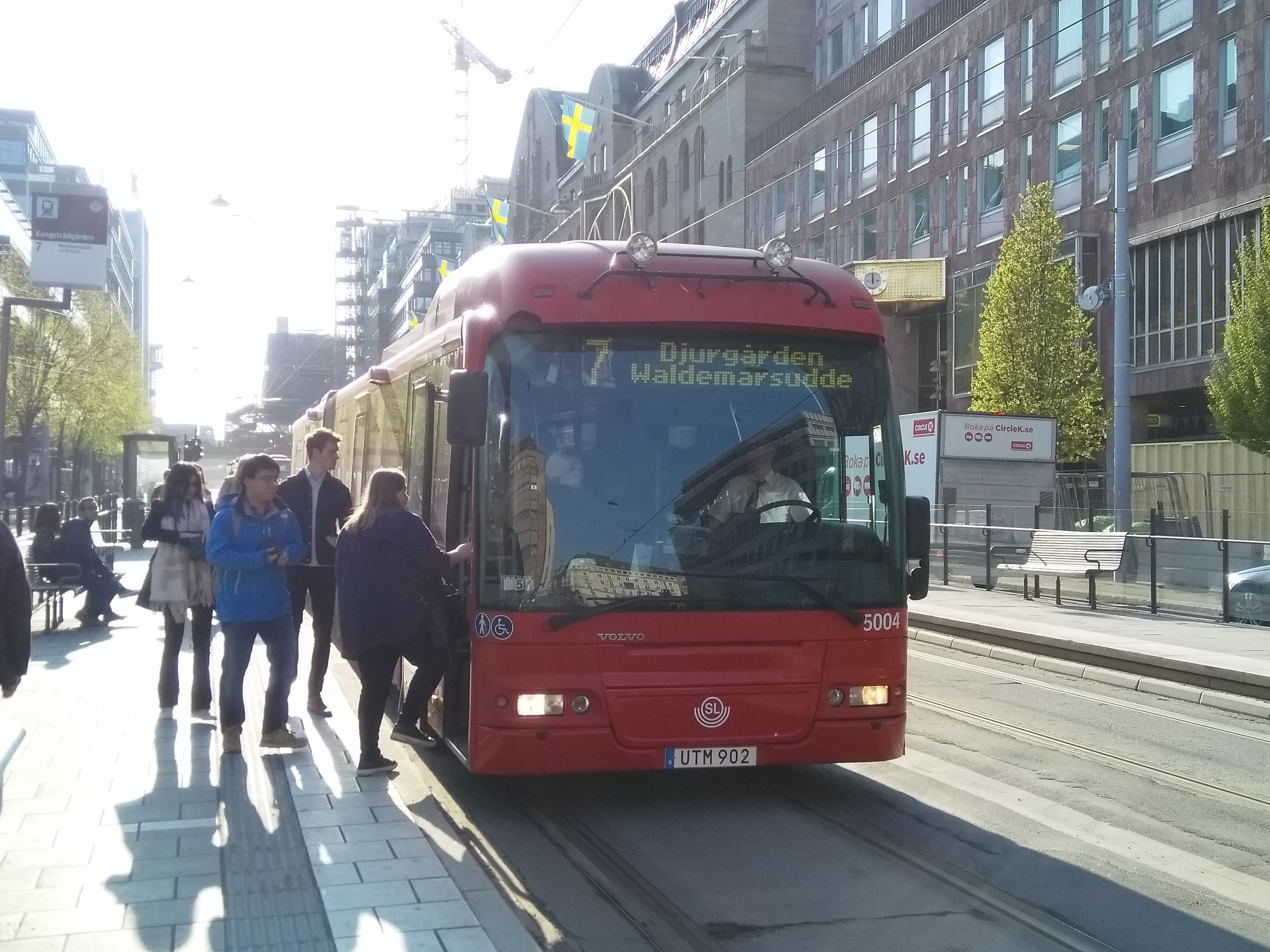
A bus running on Spårväg City tram line 7 to provide additional capacity on the line

Spårväg City (lit. 'City Tramway') is a tram line in central Stockholm, inaugurated in 2010. It is the first tram line in regular traffic in central Stockholm since 1967. The service is run by Stockholms Spårvägar for Storstockholms Lokaltrafik (SL), using the name "Route 7" ("Linje 7").

Named after the City district of central Stockholm, It is essentially an elongation of Djurgårdslinjen, which has been operated with historical cars since 1991 between Norrmalmstorg and Waldemarsudde. Djurgårdslinjen was first considered to be just a museum-tourist line, but has proven to be in much demand also by regular travels. Plans are to build the Spårväg City to reach from Kungsholmen in the west to the Lidingö bridge in the east, where it is suggested to be connected to Lidingöbanan.

The regular tram service between Sergels torg and Waldemarsudde started on 23 August 2010 with six Bombardier Flexity Classic trams. The cars were at first a dark, almost black, brown colour with gold stripes, as opposed to the traditional light blue trams of Stockholm prior to 1967, however due to complaints this was shortly changed to blue and white. An extension from Sergels torg to T-Centralen opened on 3 September 2018.

Line	Stretch	Length	Stations
7	T-Centralen – Waldemarsudde	3.5 km (2.2 mi)	11

2010 map of Spårväg City

== Djurgårdslinjen ==
AB Stockholms Spårvägar will also continue driving the museum trams on the original Norrmalmstorg - Skansen line that opened in 1991. This line is called "Djurgårdslinjen" or "Linje 7N" (i.e. Line 7N, "N" for the destination Norrmalmstorg).

== Controversy ==
The building of the line has been somewhat controversial, as the opposition in the Municipal Assembly (kommunfullmäktige) claims the line is too expensive and that it only serves well-off areas of Östermalm. It has been nicknamed "NK-expressen", since it goes directly from prestigious Strandvägen to the fashionable department store Nordiska Kompaniet.
