= Waldemarsudde =

Art museum located on Djurgården in Stockholm, Sweden

Coordinates: 59°19′12″N 18°06′47″E

Prince Eugene’s Waldemarsudde
- Prins Eugens Waldemarsudde

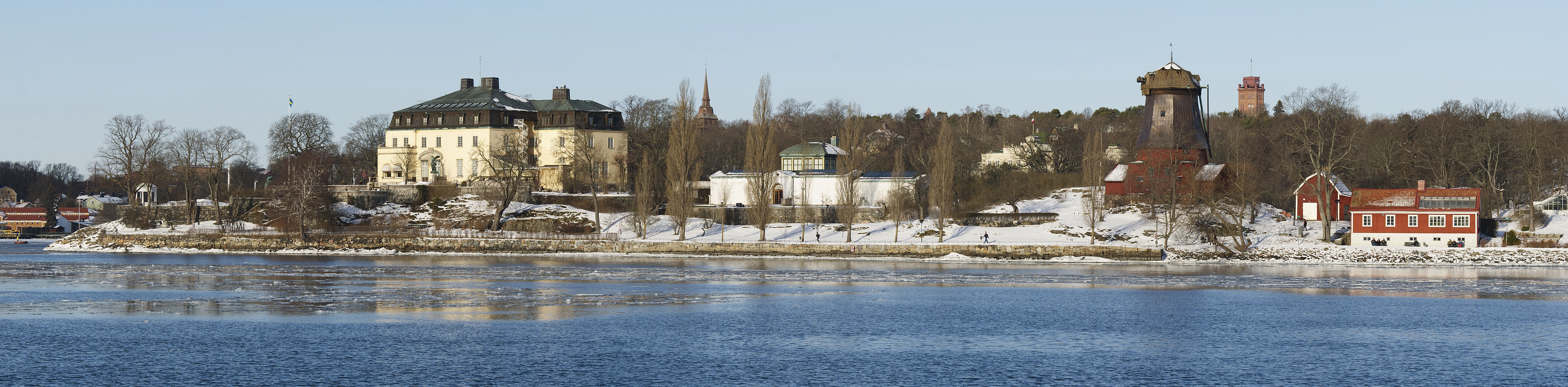
- Waldermarsudde house and gardens in 2012
- Established: 1948
- Location: Djurgården, Stockholm, Sweden
- Type: Art museum
- Key holdings: Works by Prince Eugen, Anders Zorn, Carl Larsson, and others
- Collections: Paintings, sculptures, drawings, graphic prints, handicrafts
- Collection size: ~6,700 works
- Visitors: ~440,000 annually
- Founder: Prince Eugen of Sweden
- Director: Karin Sidén
- Architect: Ferdinand Boberg
- Owner: Independent Foundation with State Grants
- Public transit access: SL Line 7
- Website: waldemarsudde.se/en/

Prince Eugene's Waldemarsudde (Swedish: Prins Eugens Waldemarsudde) is a museum located on Djurgården in Stockholm, Sweden. It was formerly the home of Prince Eugen (1865-1947), a Swedish prince, painter and art collector.

The museum houses Prince Eugen's extensive art collection, which includes approximately 7,000 works, primarily Swedish paintings but also sculptures, drawings, graphics, and medals. After Prince Eugen's death in 1947, the estate was bequeathed to the Swedish state and opened to the public as a museum in 1948.

The museum complex consists of a main building called the Mansion, completed in 1905, and a Gallery Building added in 1913, both designed by architect Ferdinand Boberg. The estate also includes an original manor house from the 1780s known as the Old House and a historic linseed oil mill.

== History ==
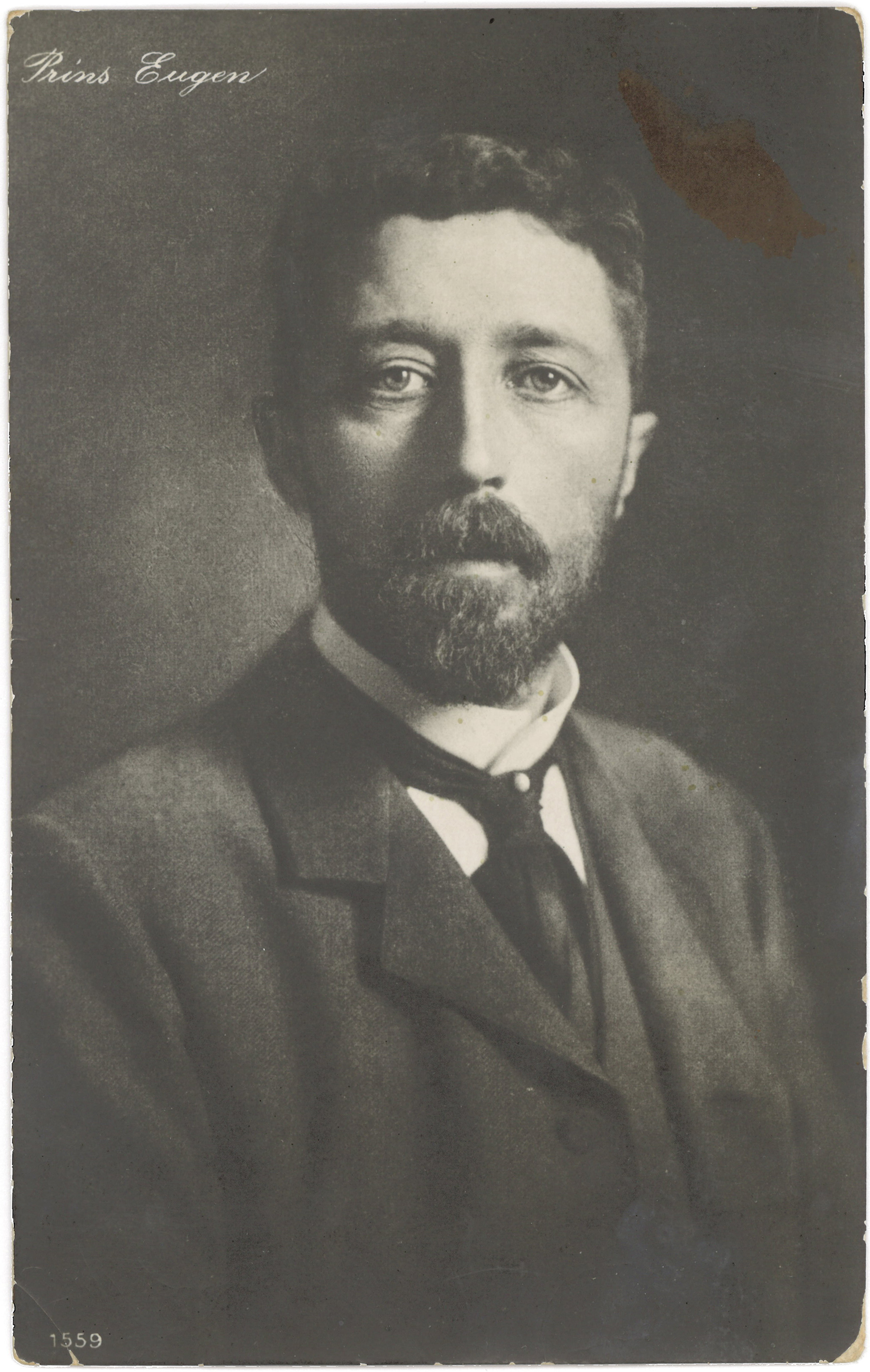
Prince Eugen in 1911

The museum's name is composed of Waldemar, an Old German noble male name, and udde, meaning cape. It is derived from a historical name of the island Djurgården, Valmundsö (see History of Djurgården.) It was the former home of the Swedish Prince Eugen, who first encountered the place in 1892, when he rented a house there for a few days. Seven years later he bought the premises and had a new house designed by the architect Ferdinand Boberg, who also designed Rosenbad (the Prime Minister's Office and the Government Chancellery), and erected 1903–1904.

Prince Eugen had been educated as a painter in Paris and after his death the house was converted to a museum of his own and others' paintings. The prince died in 1947 and is buried on the grounds by the beach close to the house.

== Museum ==
The complex consists of a castle-like main building—the Mansion—completed in 1905, and the Gallery Building, added in 1913. The estate also includes the original manor-house building, known as the Old House and an old linseed mill, both dating back to the 1780s. The estate is set in parkland which features centuries-old oak trees and reflects the prince's interest for gardening and flower arrangement. The Art Nouveau interior, including the masonry stoves, by Boberg are designed in a Gustavian style and make good use of both the panoramic view of the inlet to Stockholm and the light resulting from the elevated location of the building.

== Gallery ==
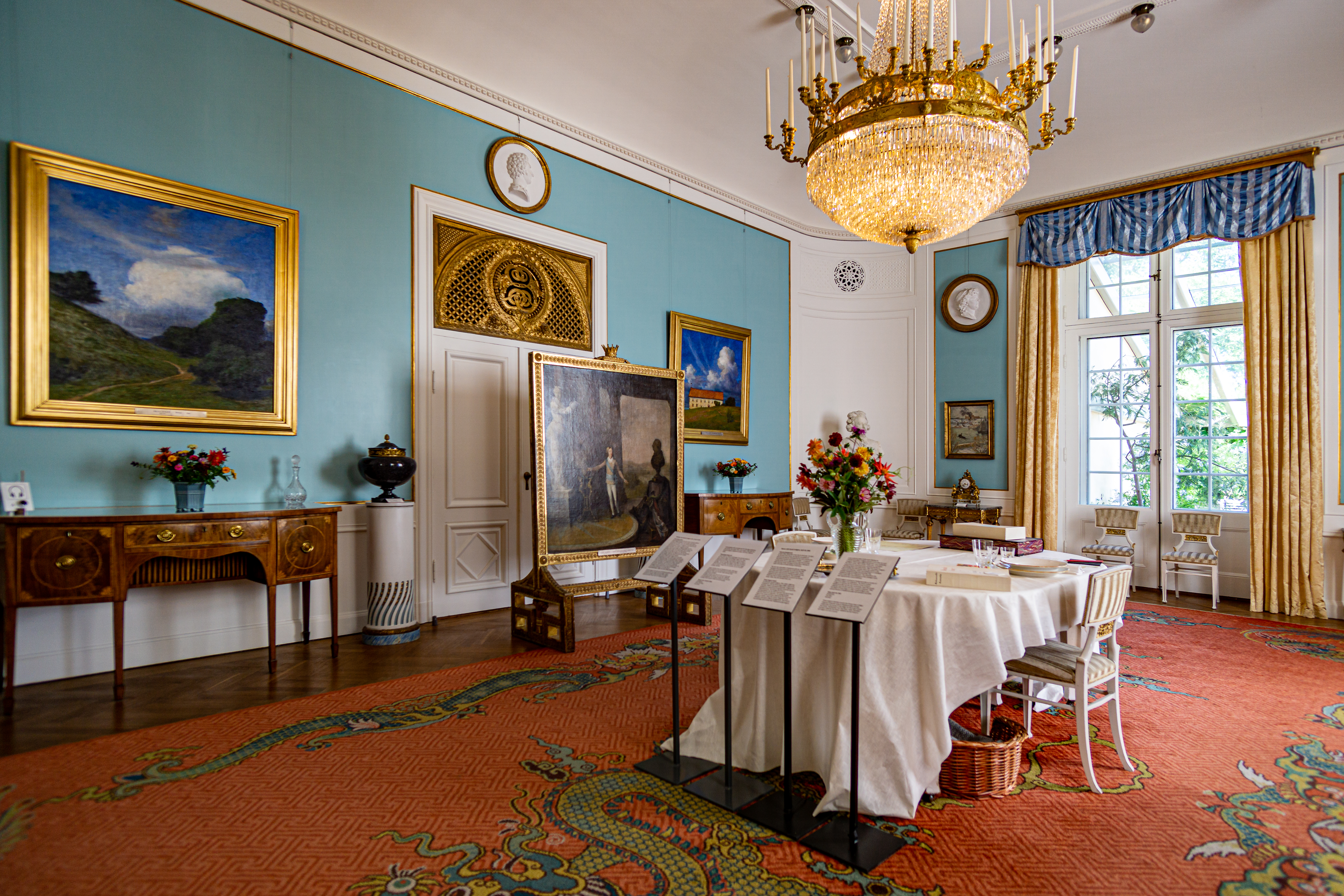
House Interior

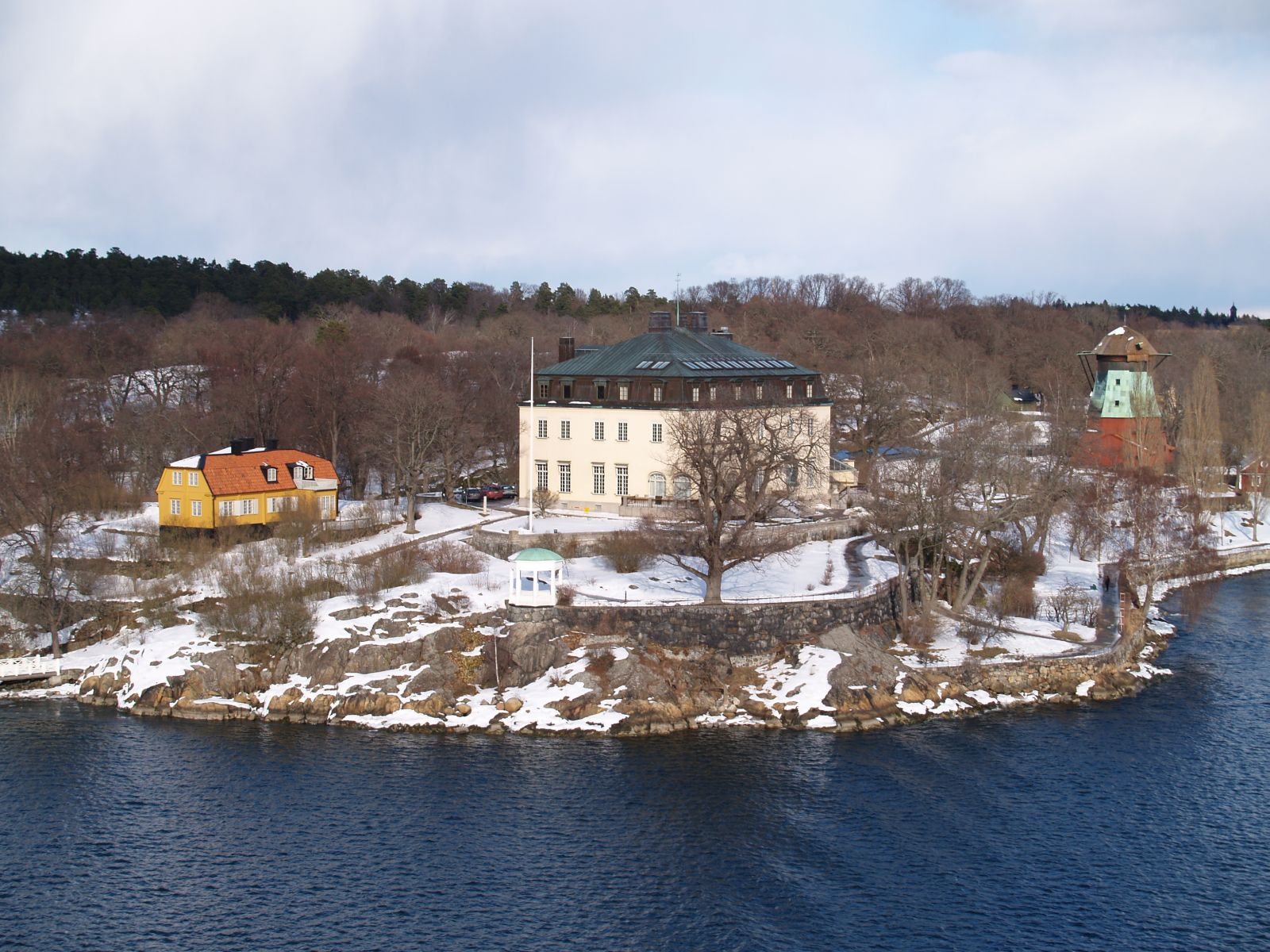
Waldemarsudde in March 2006

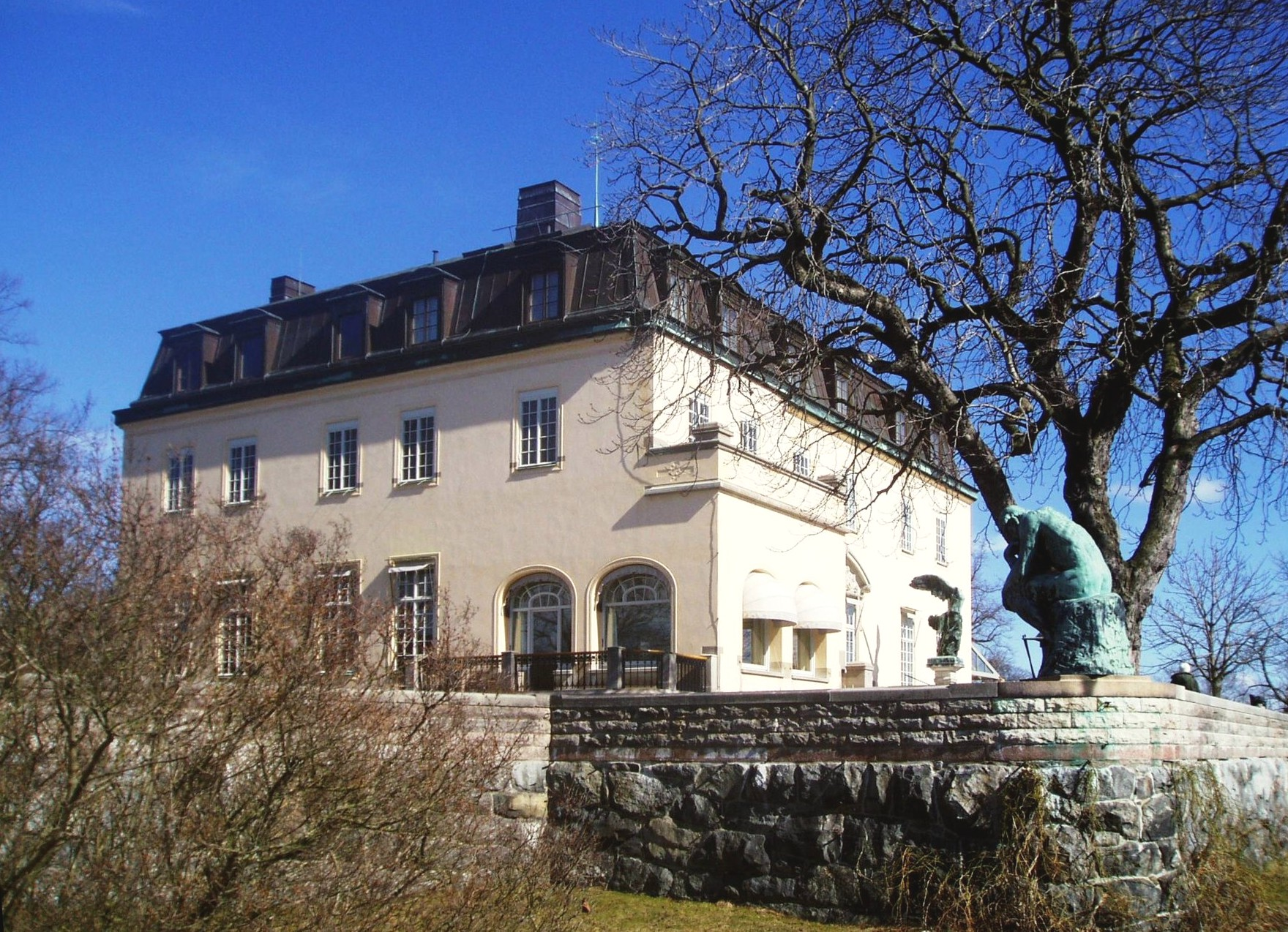
Waldemarsudde in April 2006

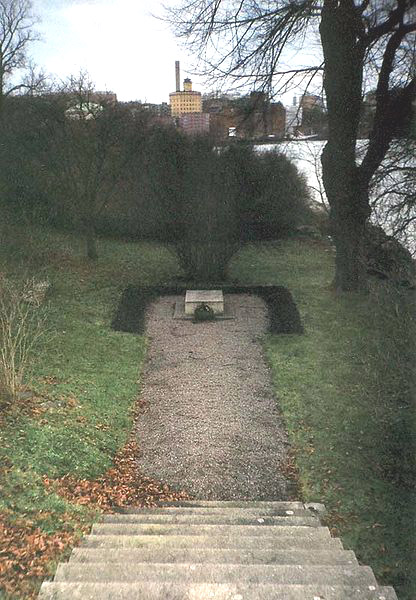
Prince Eugen's grave

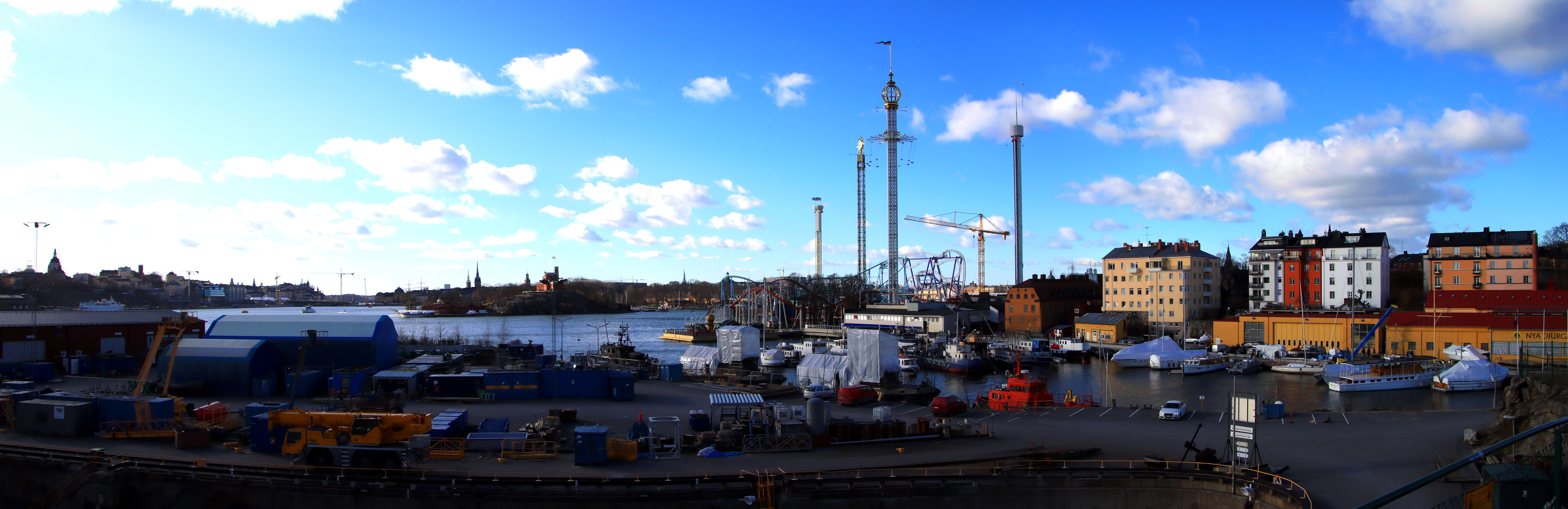
View from Beckholmen in March 2020

== See also ==
- List of museums in Stockholm
- Culture in Stockholm
