= Alvik metro station =

Stockholm Metro and tramway station

Alvik
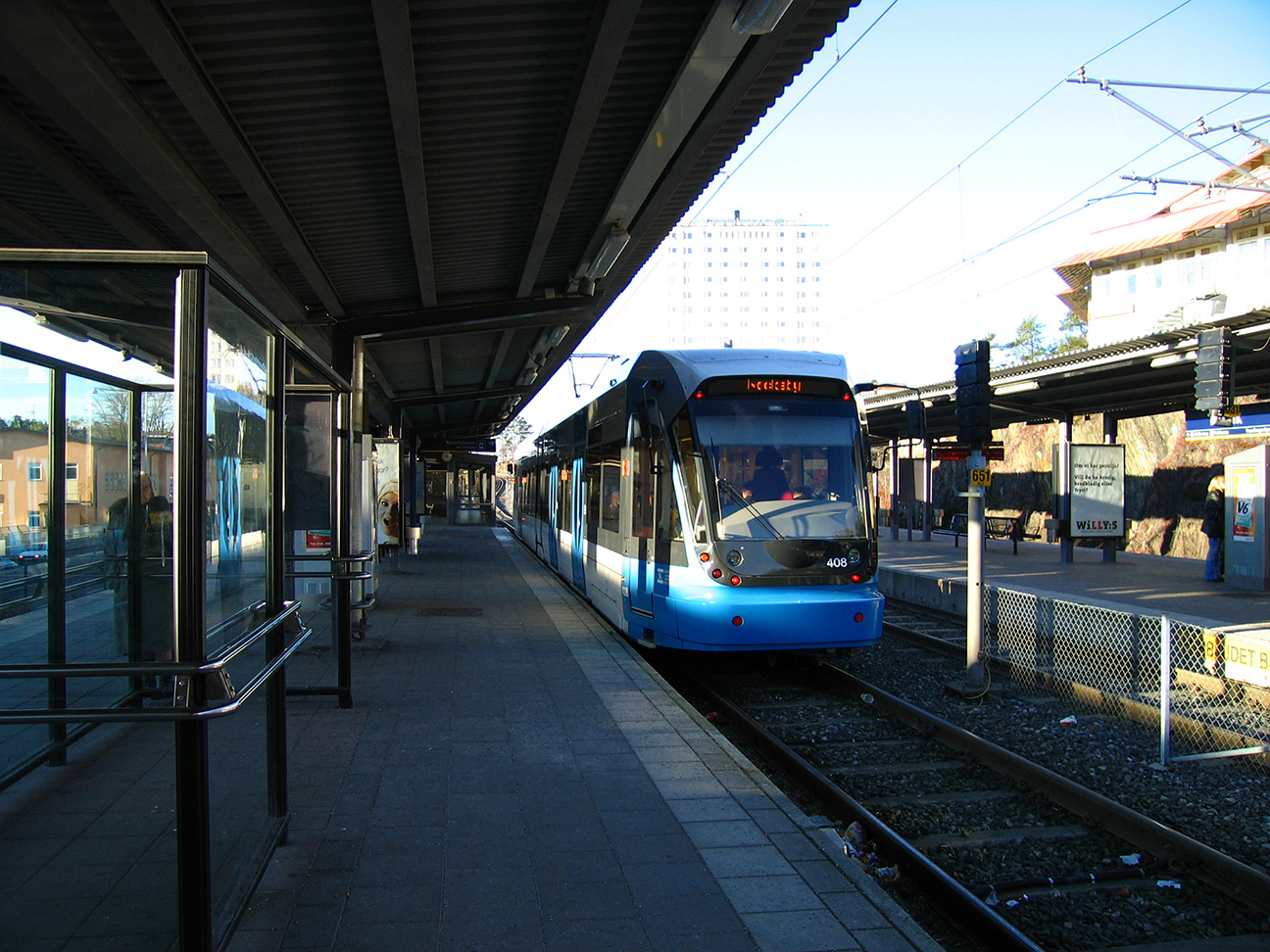
- Inner tracks used by Nockebybanan trams

General information
- Coordinates: 59°20′0″N 17°58′57″E
- System: Stockholm Metro station
- Owner: Storstockholms Lokaltrafik
- Platforms: 2 island platforms, 2 side platforms
- Tracks: 2 (Green Line); 2 (Tvärbanan; 2 (Nockebybanan

Construction
- Structure type: At grade
- Accessible: Yes

Other information
- Station code: ALV

History
- Opened: 26 October 1952; 73 years ago

Passengers
- 2019: 18,100 boarding per weekday (metro)
- 2019: 7,900 boarding per weekday (Tvärbanan)
- 2019: 5,200 boarding per weekday (Nockebybanan)

Services
Preceding station	Stockholm Metro	Following station
Stora mossen towards Åkeshov	Line 17	Kristineberg towards Skarpnäck
Terminus	Line 18	Kristineberg towards Farsta strand
Stora mossen towards Hässelby strand	Line 19	Kristineberg towards Hagsätra

Other services
Preceding station	SL Local & Light Rail	Following station
Johannesfred towards Solna station	Tvärbanan Line 30	Alviks strand towards Sickla
Johannesfred towards Bromma flygplats	Tvärbanan Line 31	Alviks strand Terminus
Alléparken towards Nockeby	Nockebybanan Line 12	Terminus
Location
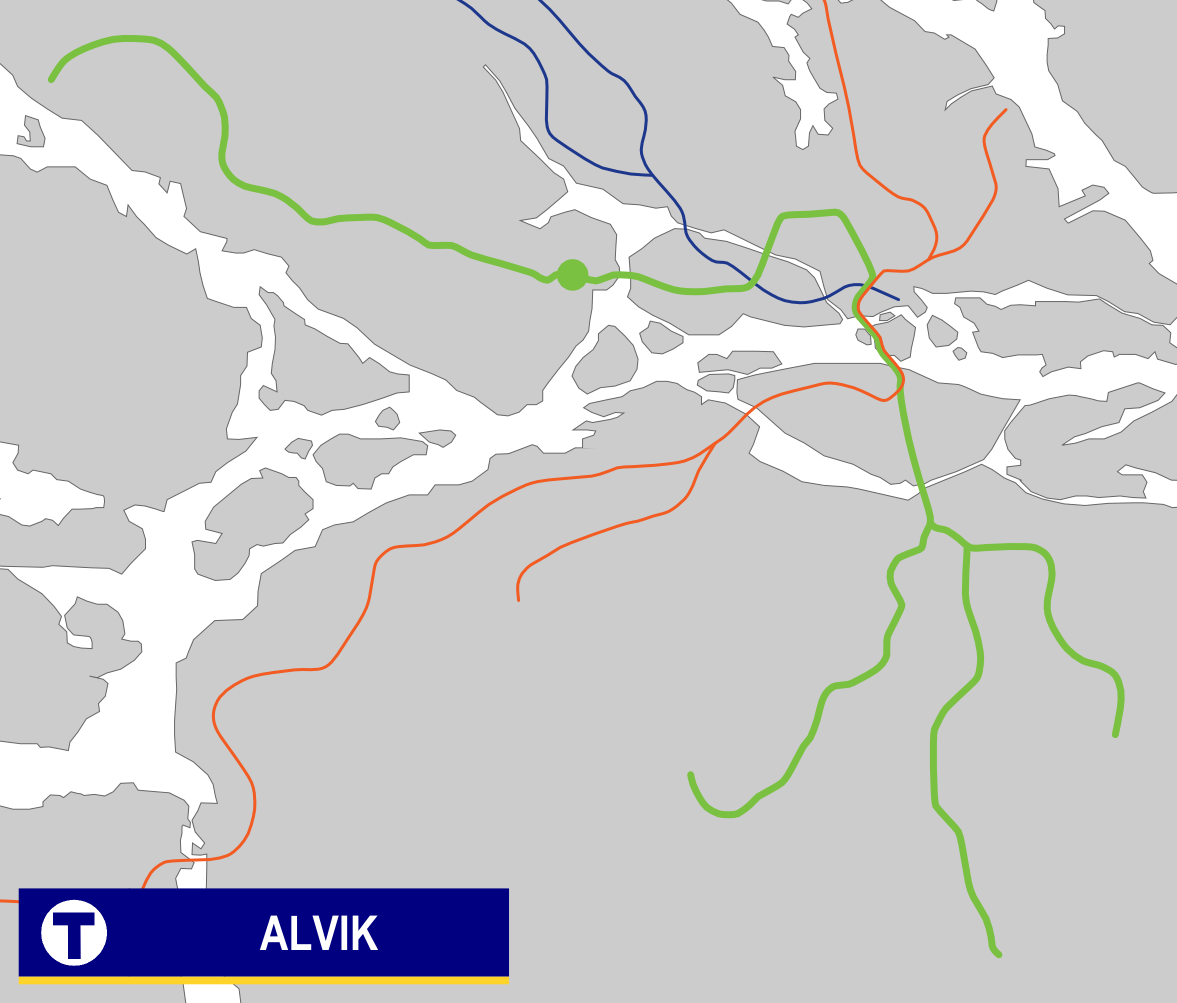

Alvik metro station is a station on the Green Line of the Stockholm Metro, and on the Tvärbanan and Nockebybanan lines of Stockholm tramways. It is located on the border between the districts of Traneberg and Alvik, which are part of the borough of Bromma in the west of the city of Stockholm. The station is one of the intermediate termini along the northern section of the Green Line, with Line 18 trains normally terminating, and is also the terminus of the Nockebybanan.

Alvik station has tracks on two levels, both above ground. The higher level has two island platforms aligned east-west and serving four tracks. The outer pair of tracks are through tracks used by metro trains, whilst the inner pair of tracks are used to terminate Nockebybanan trams, thus providing cross-platform interchange between the Nockebybanan and metro. The lower level, which is at street level, has a pair of side platforms, aligned north-south and just to the west of the higher level platforms, which are used by trams on the Tvärbanan.

At the west end of the station, a complex set of elevated tracks ensures that Metro trains and trams on both lines are segregated from each other. The Metro and the Nockeby tramway are also connected by shared tracks (electrified with both third rail and overhead lines) to the nearby Brommadepån tram depot. Metro trains terminating at Alvik use reversing tracks within the depot to switch between westbound and eastbound metro platforms. A curved tunnel also connects the depot to the lower Tvärbanan tracks, thus allow stock interchange between the two tram lines.

== History ==
The site of Alvik station was situated on the Nockebybanan tram line, which linked central Stockholm with Nockeby and opened in stages between 1914 and 1929. The tram line ran in the streets to the east of Alvik, but ran on segregated track with frequent level crossings to the west. In 1934 the old Tranebergsbron bridge just east of Alvik was replaced by a new bridge with segregated tram tracks. In 1944, the Ängbybanan tram line was opened from Islandstorget to Alvik, with the trams continuing into the city centre over the same tracks as the Nockebybanan. The Ängbybanan was designed and built for use by the future metro, and was segregated without level crossings.

On 26 October 1952, the first northern stretch of the metro opened between Hötorget and Vällingby, including Alvik station. This made use of both the Ängbybanan alignment to the west of Alvik, and the former tram tracks across the Tranebergsbron to the east. The Nockebybanan remained operated by trams, but the conversion of the Tranebergsbron tracks meant it was truncated at Alvik and cut off from the rest of the Stockholm tramway network, so Alvik station was designed to provide cross-platform interchange between Nockebybanan trams and metro trains.

In 2000 the Tvärbanan tramway was connected to Alvik. An extension to Solna was opened in autumn 2013 via a tunnel towards Ulvsunda.
