= Abrahamsberg metro station =

Stockholm Metro station

Abrahamsberg
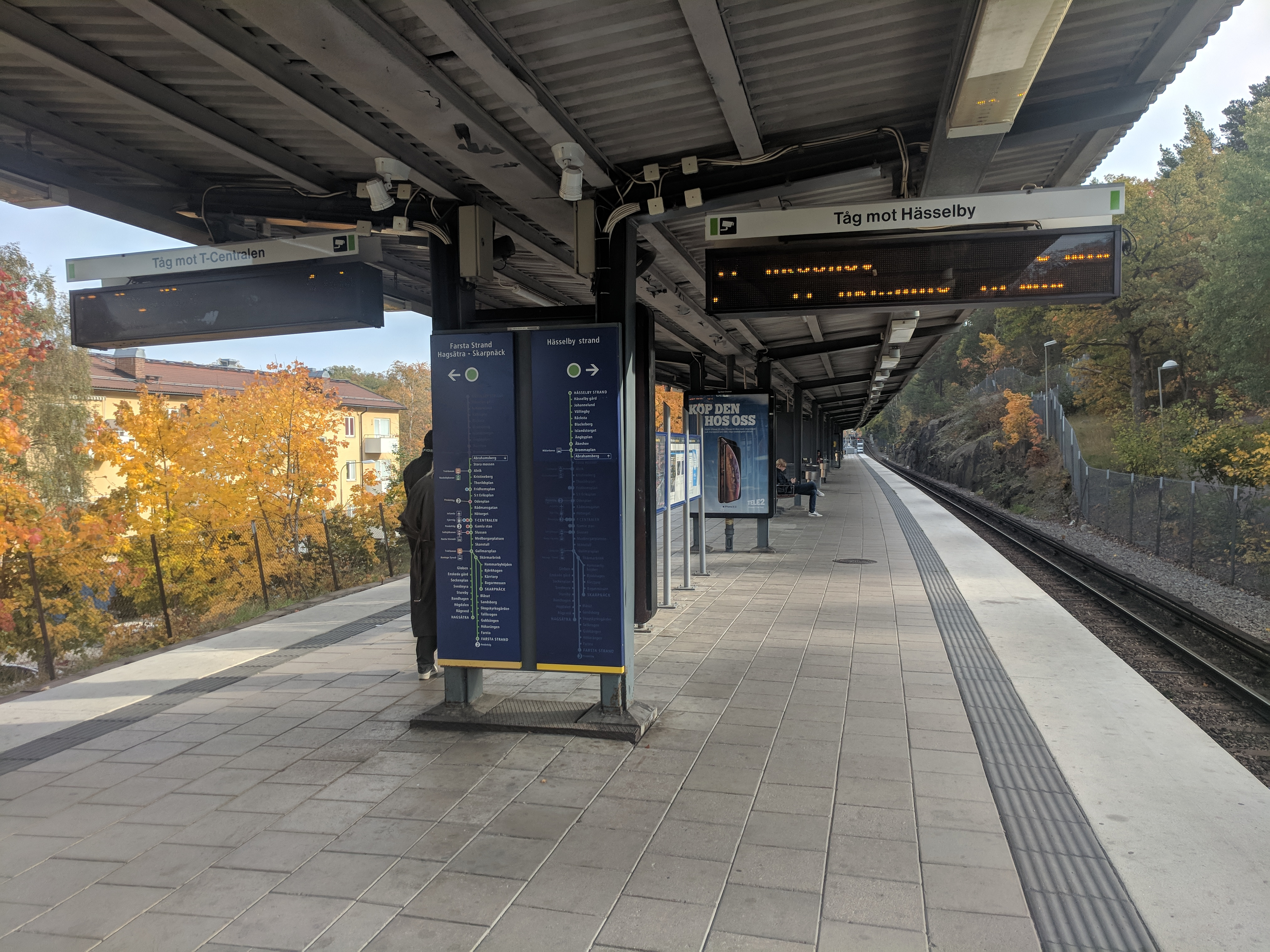
- Station platform, 2018

General information
- Coordinates: 59°20′11″N 17°57′15″E
- System: Stockholm Metro station
- Owner: Storstockholms Lokaltrafik
- Platforms: 1 island platform
- Tracks: 2

Construction
- Structure type: Elevated
- Depth: 0 m (0 ft)
- Accessible: Yes

Other information
- Station code: ABB

History
- Opened: 26 October 1952; 73 years ago

Passengers
- 2019: 4,800 boarding per weekday (metro)

Services
Preceding station	Stockholm Metro	Following station
Brommaplan towards Åkeshov	Line 17	Stora mossen towards Skarpnäck
Brommaplan towards Hässelby strand	Line 19	Stora mossen towards Hagsätra
Location
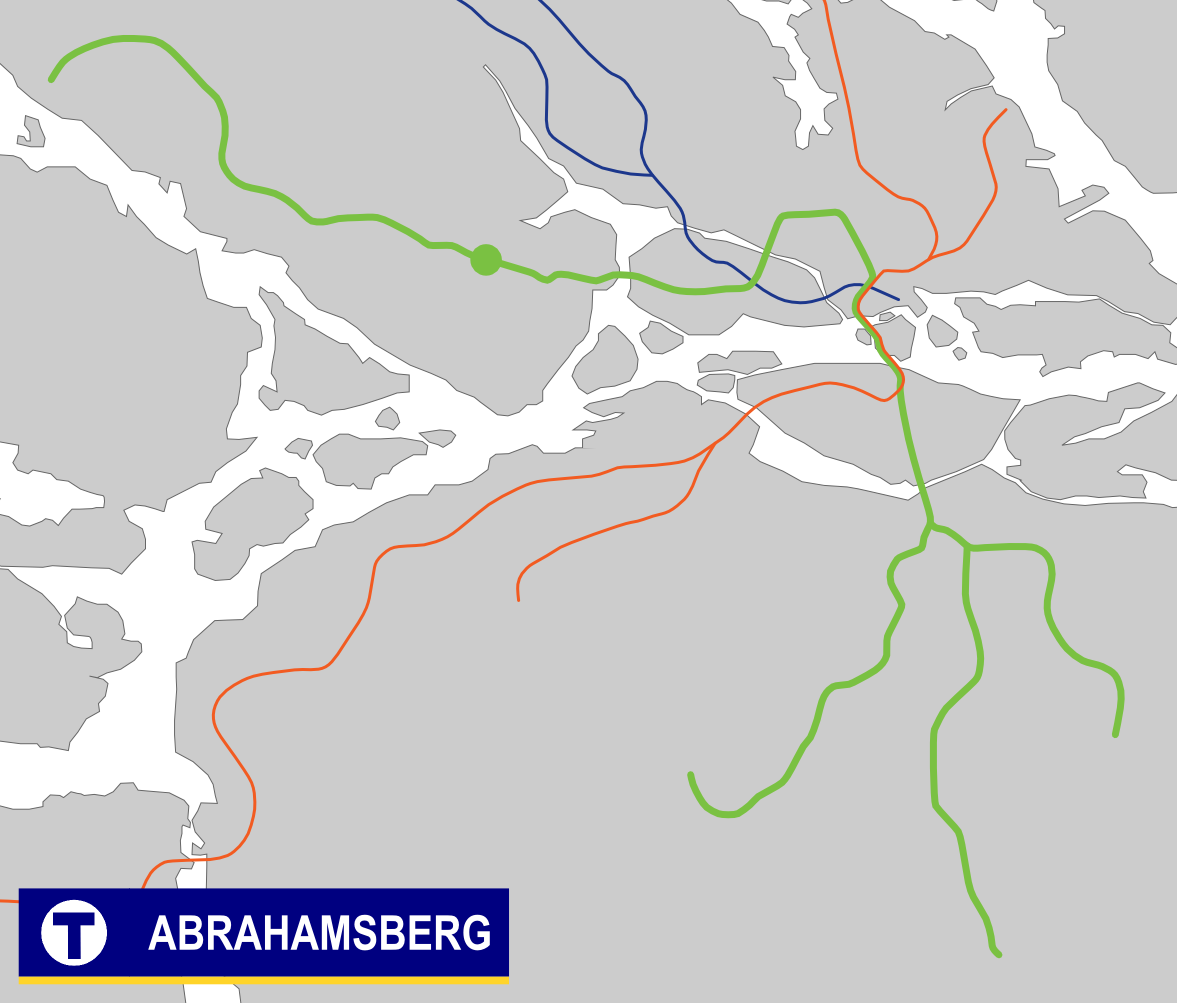

Abrahamsberg is a station on the Green Line of the Stockholm Metro. It is located on the border between the districts of Riksby and Abrahamsberg, which are part of the borough of Bromma in the west of the city of Stockholm. The station is above ground and has a single island platform, with access from underpass carrying Abrahamsbergsvägen under the line.

The station lies on the route of a line known as the Ängbybanan that formerly linked Alvik and Islandstorget. The Ängbybanan was designed and built for use by the future metro, but was operated from 1944 as part of line 11 of the Stockholm tramway. Abrahamsberg station was inaugurated as part of the metro on 26 October 1952 with the conversion of the Ängbybanan and its extension to form the metro line between Hötorget and Vällingby.

In 1998, it was announced the station would be rebuilt beginning that winter. After the renovations, Abrahamsberg was officially re-opened on 25 November 1999. The ceremony featured a performance by the Swedish Wind Ensemble.

As part of Art in the Stockholm metro project, this station features tiling in both the ticket hall and stairwell in a grey scale. A stoneware frieze in the ticket hall, created by Rigmor Roxner, was installed in 1999.

== Gallery ==
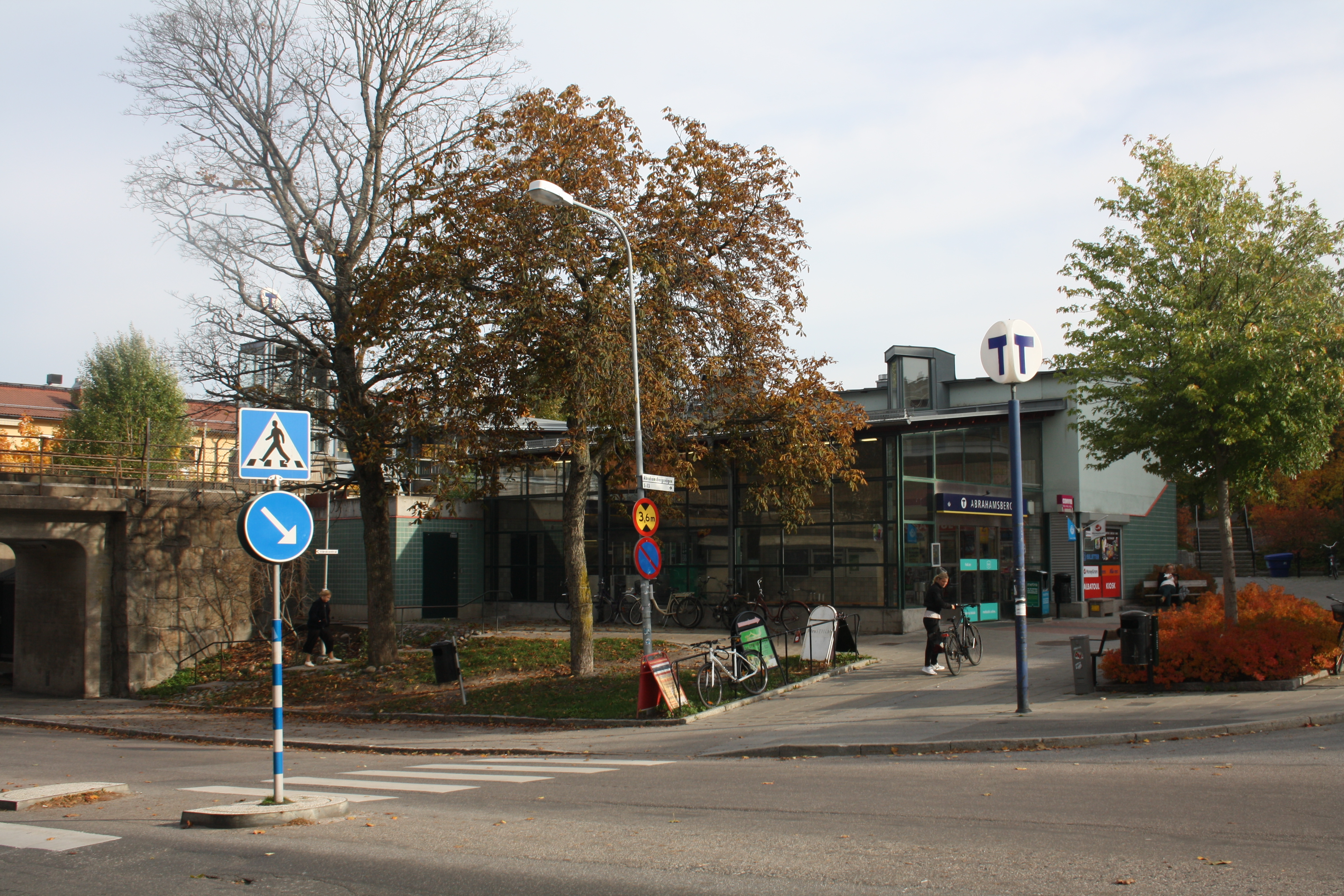
Station entrance, 2019

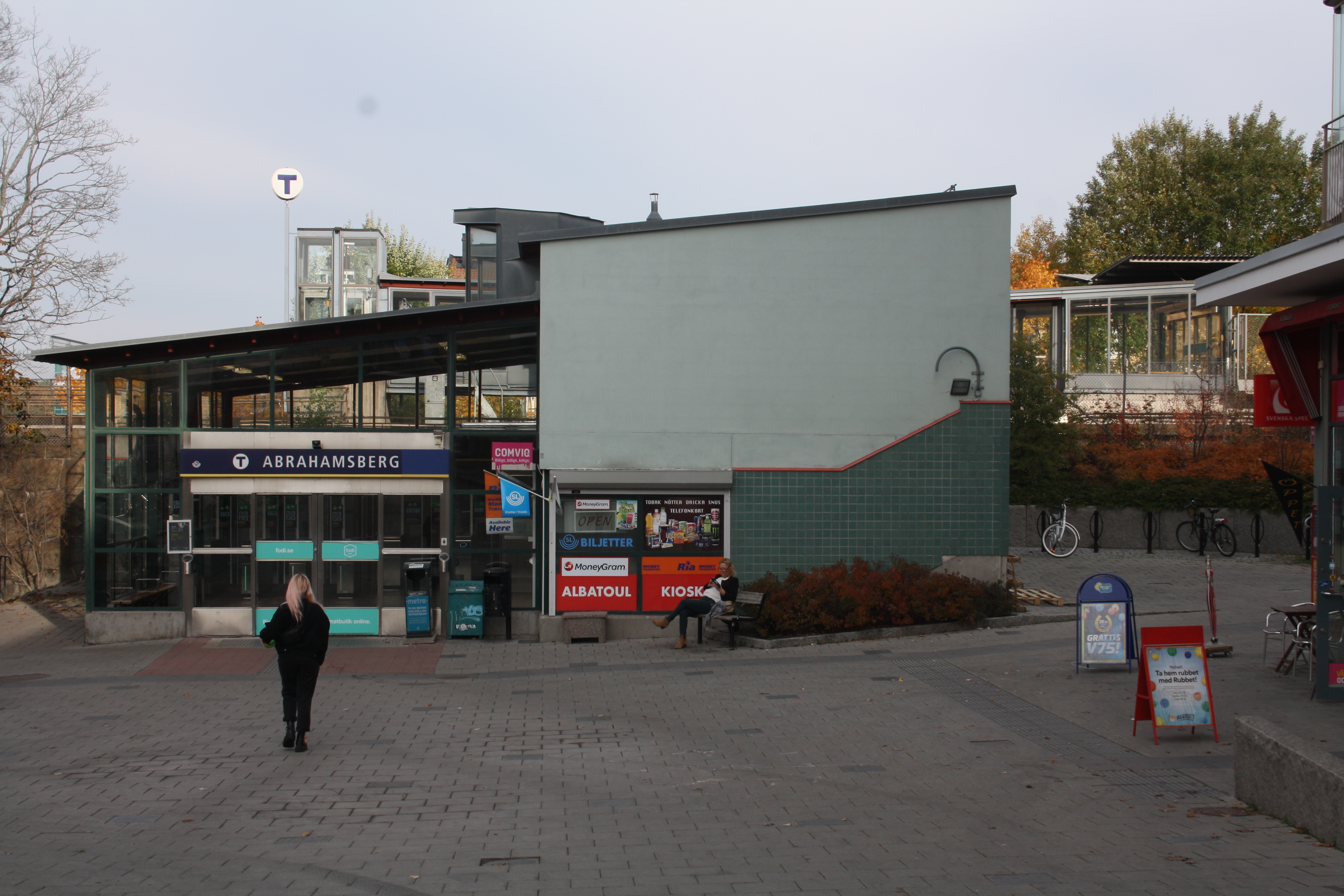
Station building, 2018

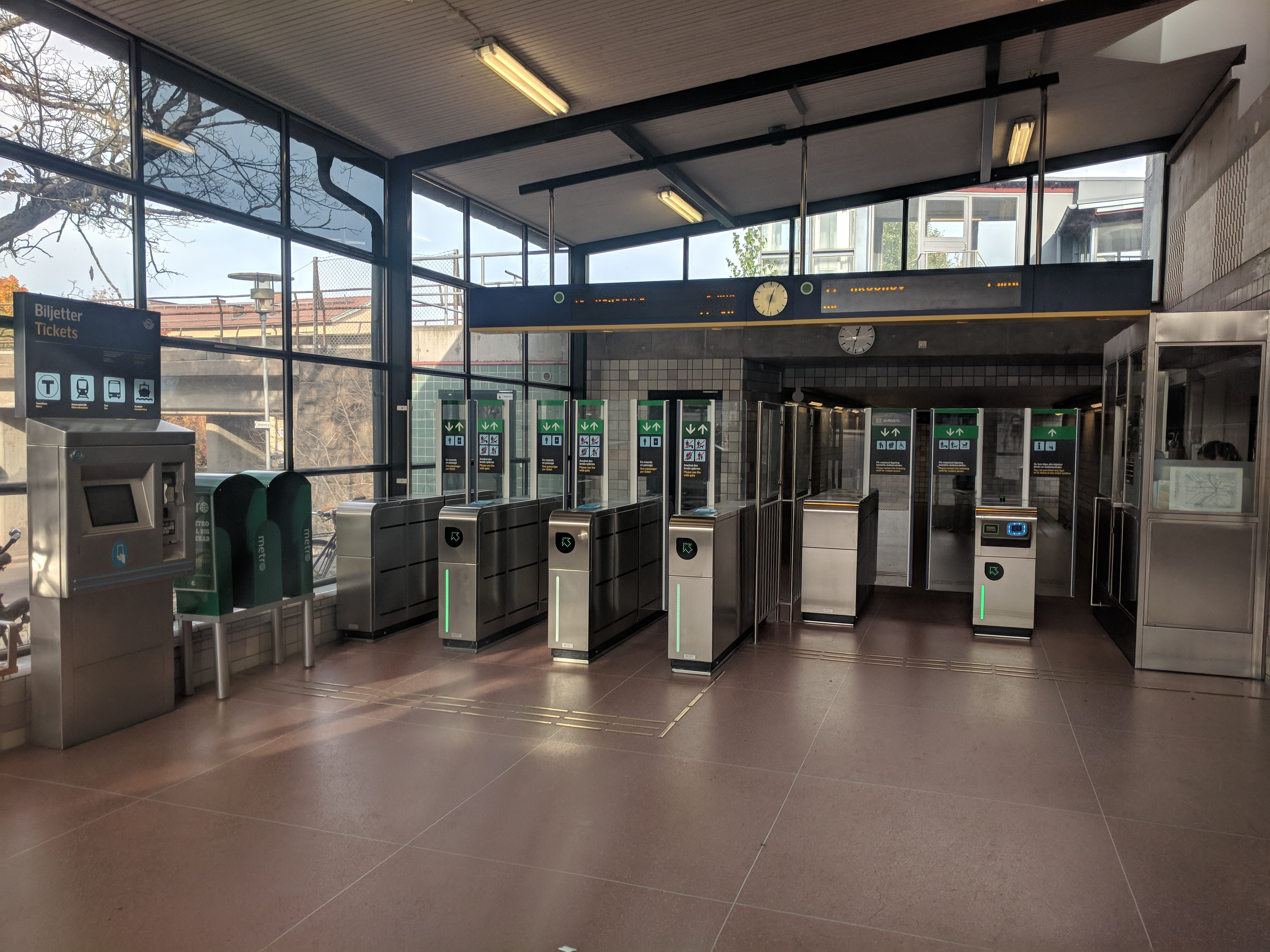
Ticket hall, 2018

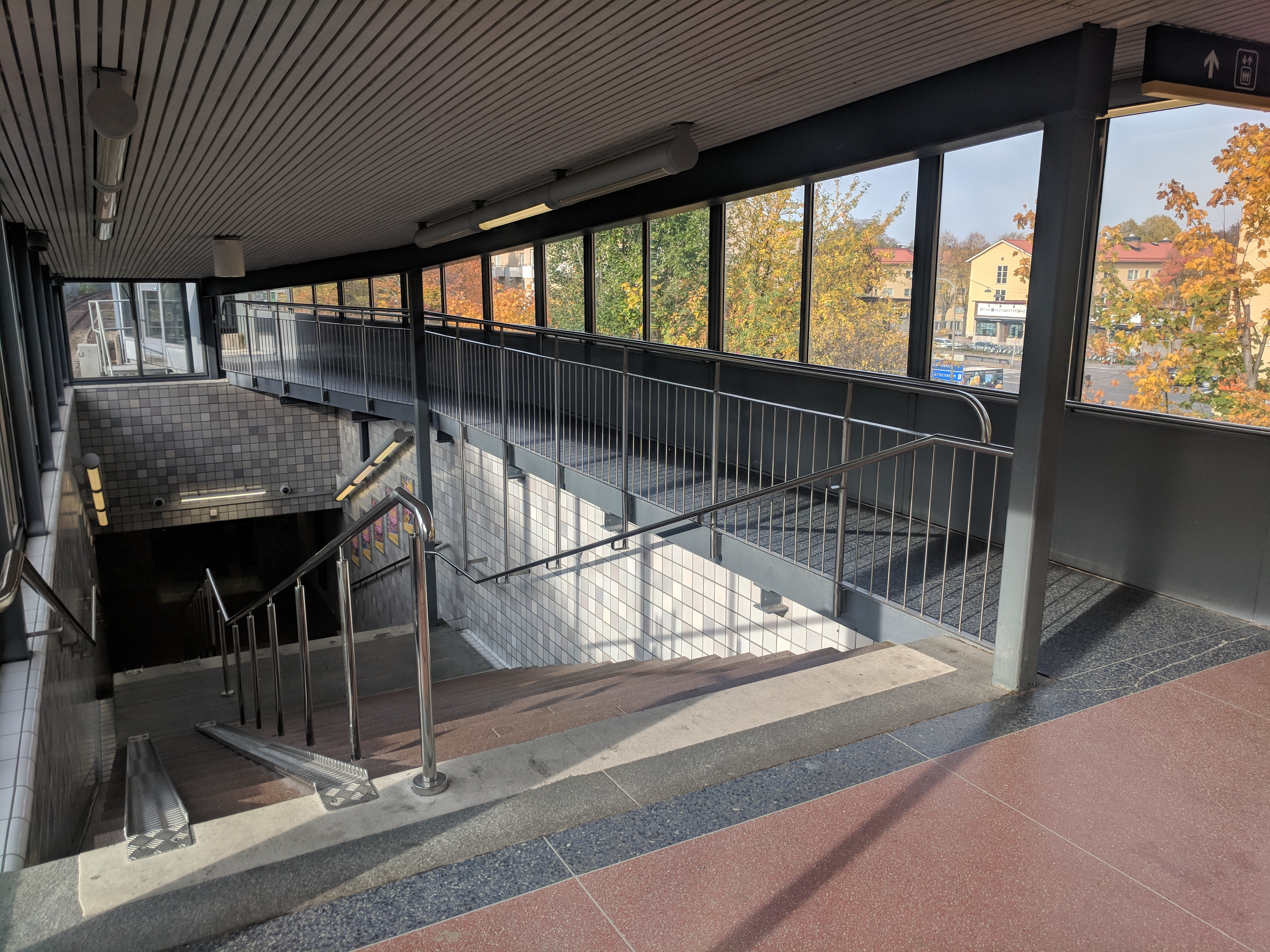
Steps to platform, 2018
