= Stora mossen metro station =

Stockholm Metro station

Stora mossen
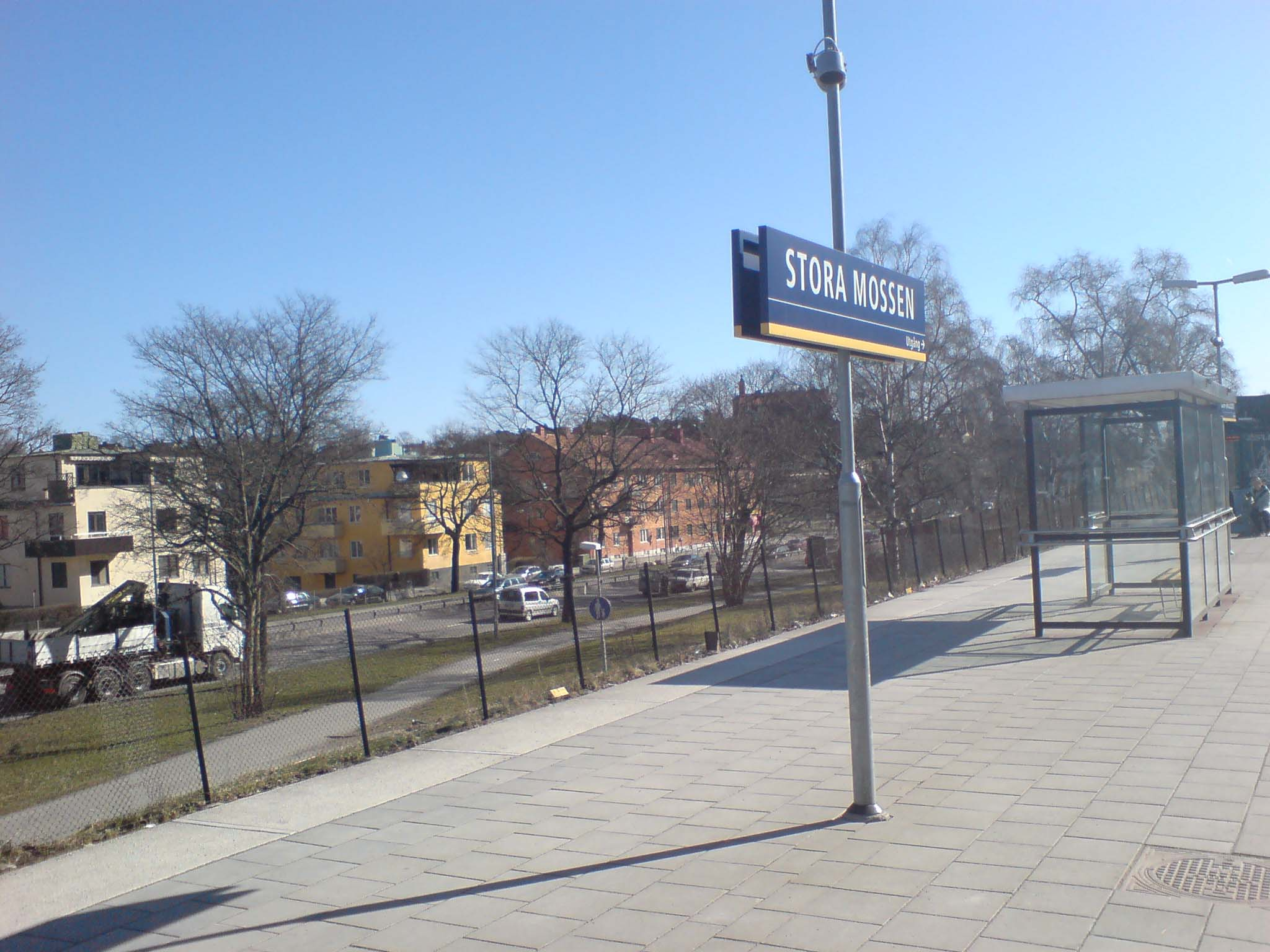
- Station platform, 2007

General information
- Coordinates: 59°20′05″N 17°57′54″E
- System: Stockholm Metro station
- Owner: Storstockholms Lokaltrafik
- Platforms: 1 island platform
- Tracks: 2

Construction
- Structure type: At grade
- Depth: 0 m (0 ft)
- Accessible: Yes

Other information
- Station code: SMO

History
- Opened: 26 October 1952; 73 years ago

Passengers
- 2019: 2,650 boarding per weekday

Services
Preceding station	Stockholm Metro	Following station
Abrahamsberg towards Åkeshov	Line 17	Alvik towards Skarpnäck
Abrahamsberg towards Hässelby strand	Line 19	Alvik towards Hagsätra
Location
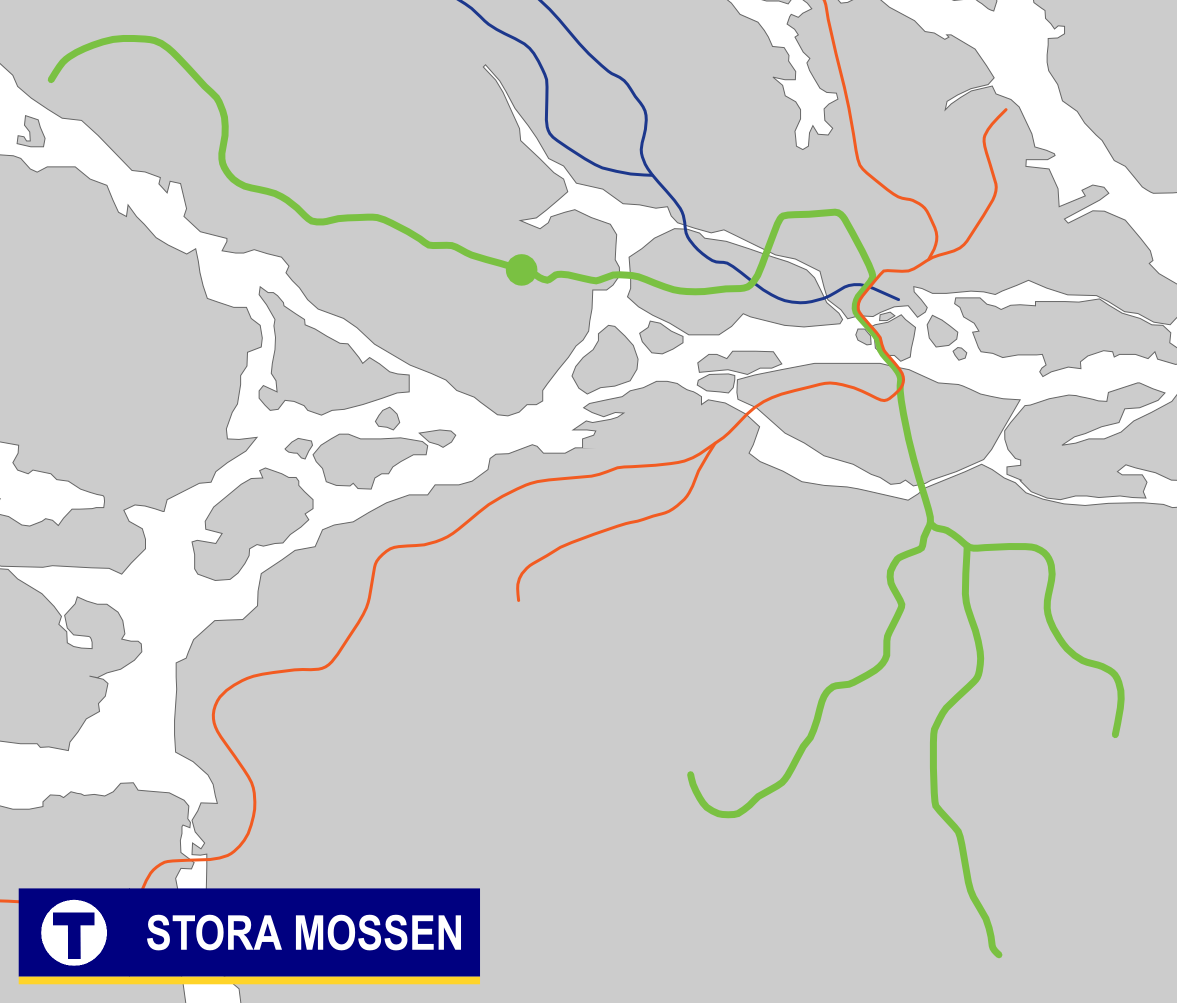

Stora mossen metro station is a station on the Green Line of the Stockholm Metro. It is located on the border between the districts of Ulvsunda and Stora mossen, which are part of the borough of Bromma in the west of the city of Stockholm. The station is on an embankment and has a single island platform, with access from a pedestrian subway under the line linking Drottningholmsvägen and Stora Mossens Backe. The distance to Slussen is 9 km (5.6 mi).

The station lies on the route of a line known as the Ängbybanan that formerly linked Alvik and Islandstorget. The Ängbybanan was designed and built for use by the future Metro, but was operated from 1944 as part of Line 11 of the Stockholm tramway. Stora mossen station was inaugurated as part of the metro on 26 October 1952 with the conversion of the Ängbybanan and its extension to form the metro line between Hötorget and Vällingby.

== Gallery ==
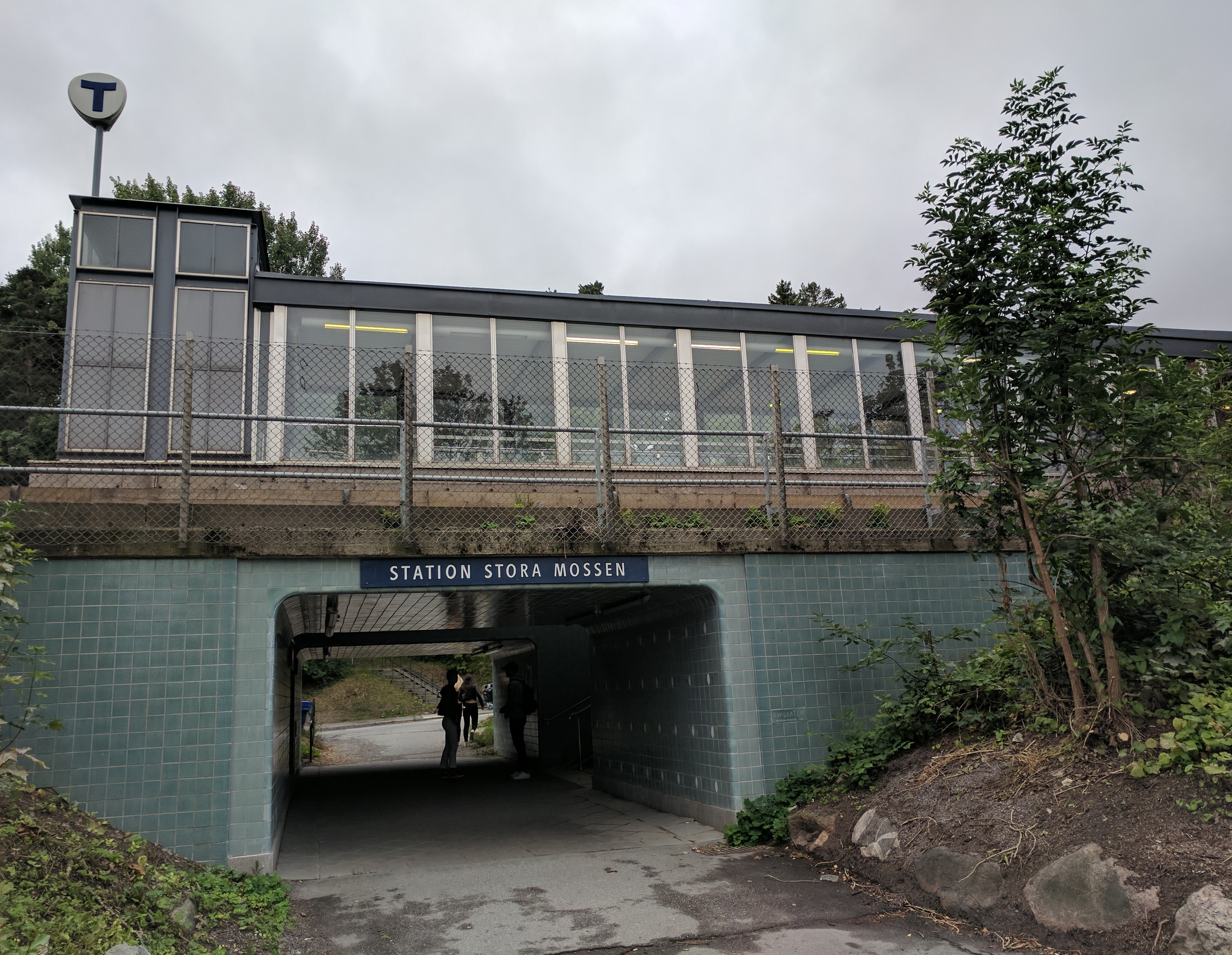
The subway, 2017

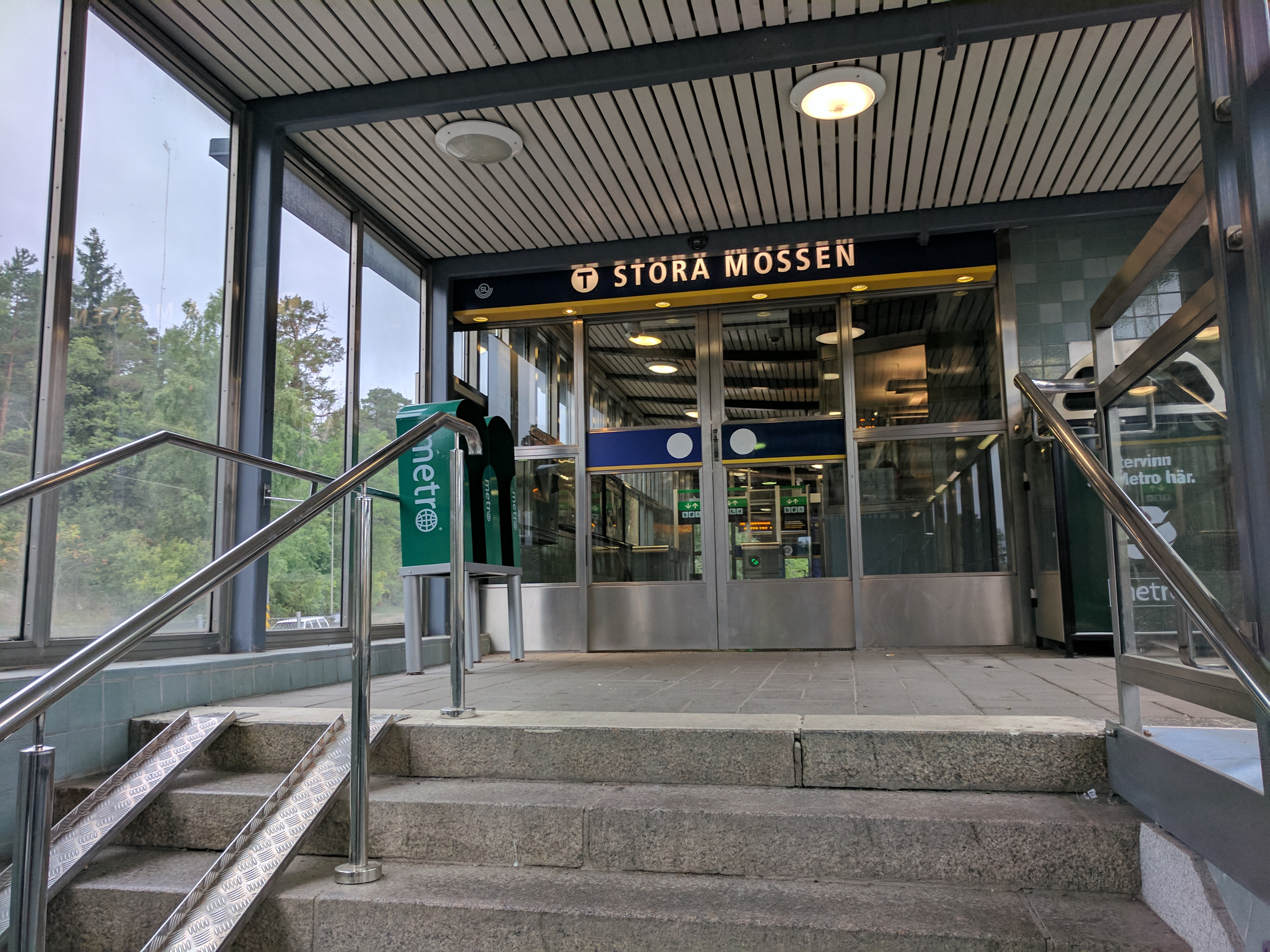
Entrance from subway, 2017

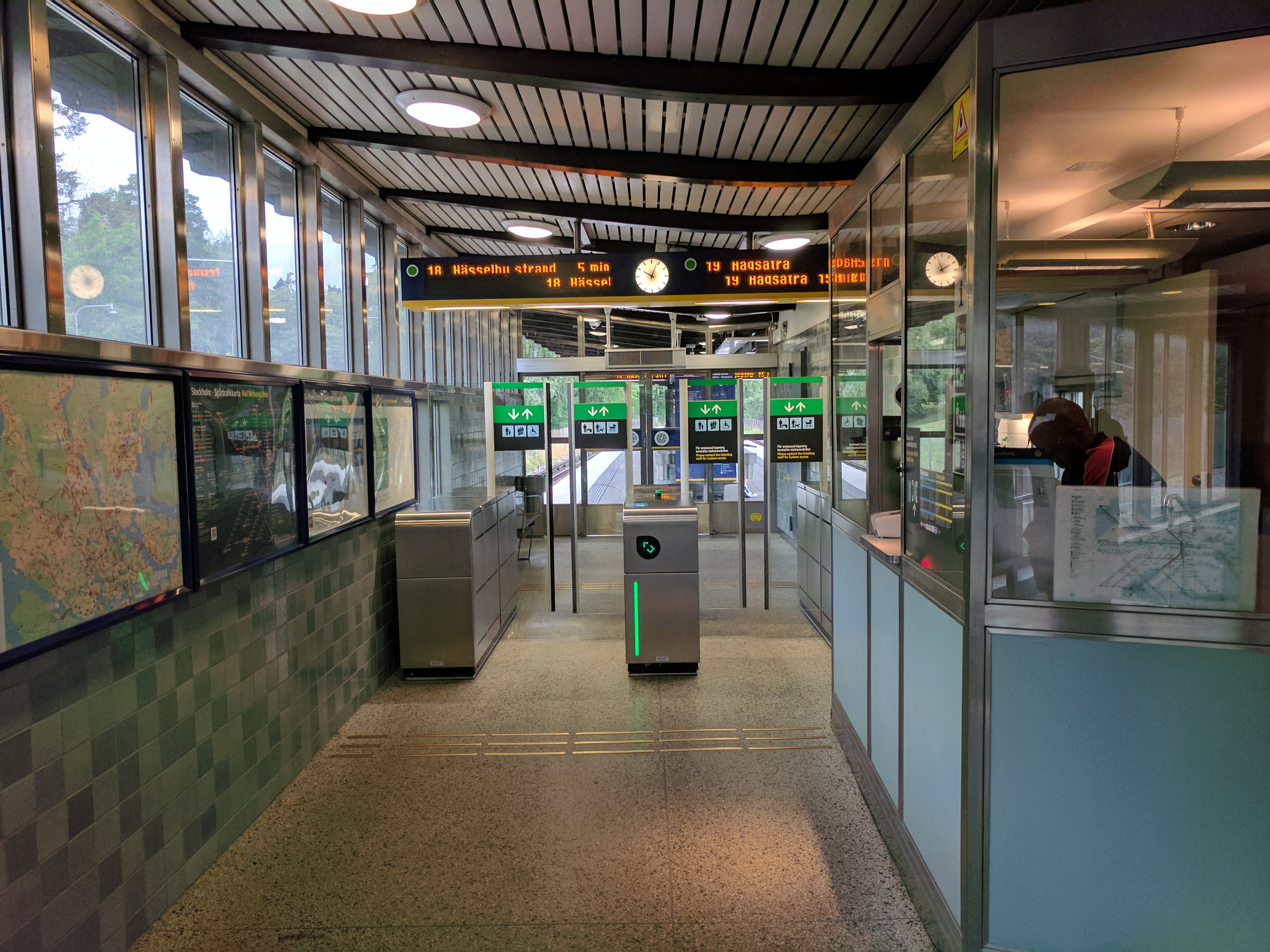
inside the station, 2017

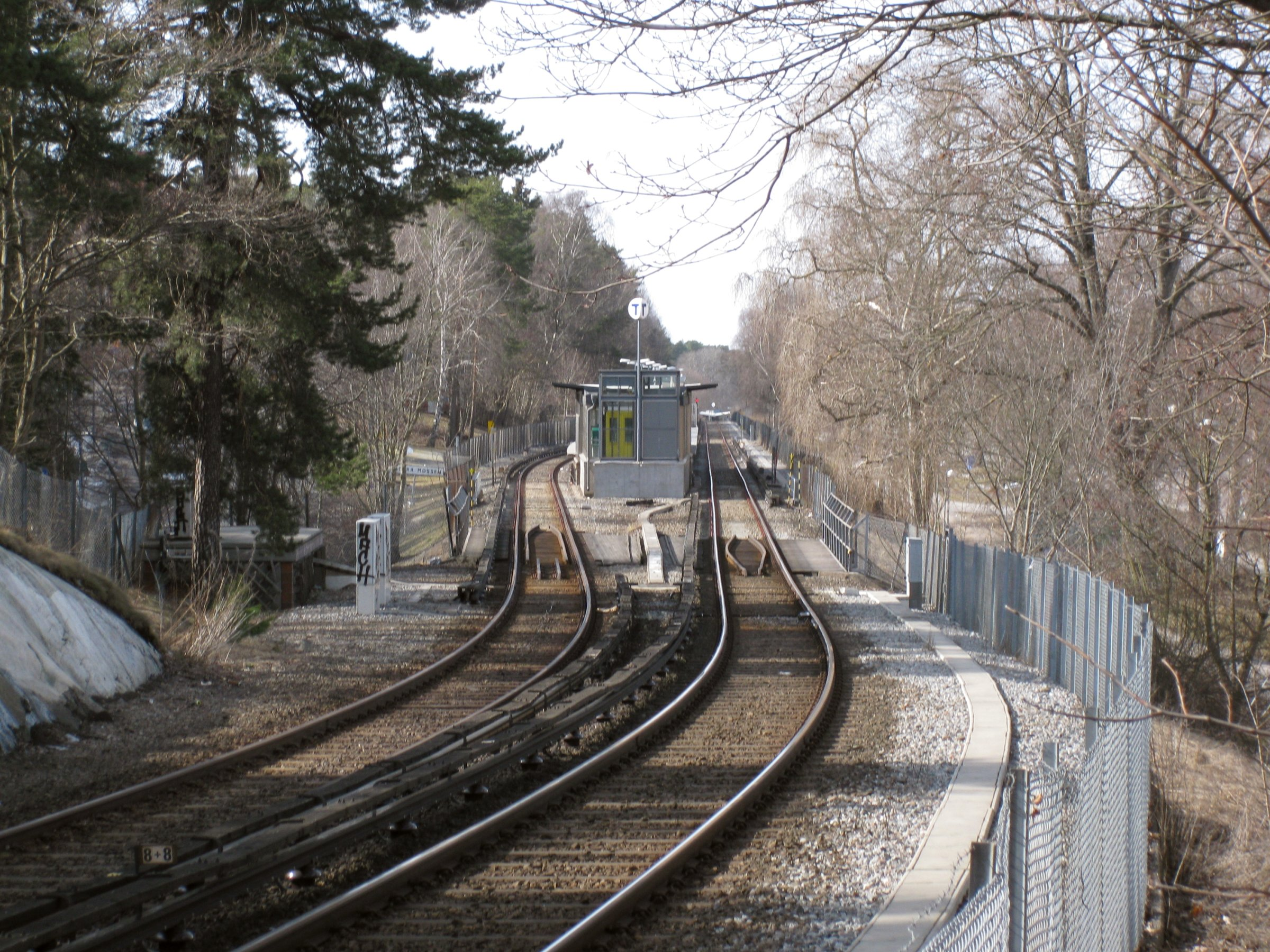
Station from the east, 2010
