= Nockebybanan =

Light rail line in Stockholm, Sweden

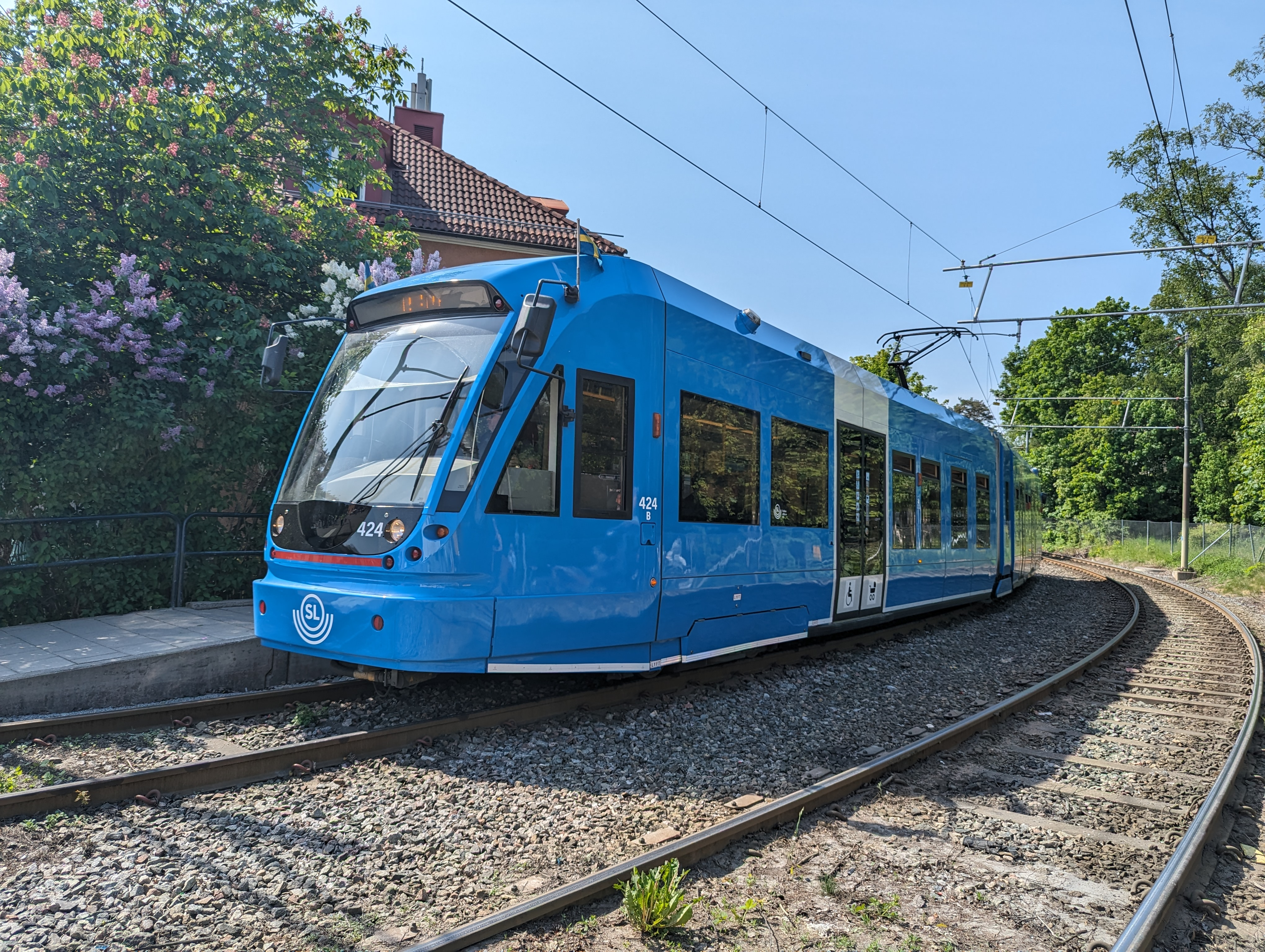

Overview
- Owner: Storstockholms Lokaltrafik
- Locale: Stockholm
- Stations: 10

Service
- Type: Tram/Light-rail
- Operator: Stockholms Spårvägar
- Ridership: 11,800 boardings (2019)

History
- Opened: 1914; 112 years ago

Technical
- Line length: 5.6 km (3.5 mi)
- Track gauge: 1,435 mm (4 ft 8 1/2 in) standard gauge
Route map
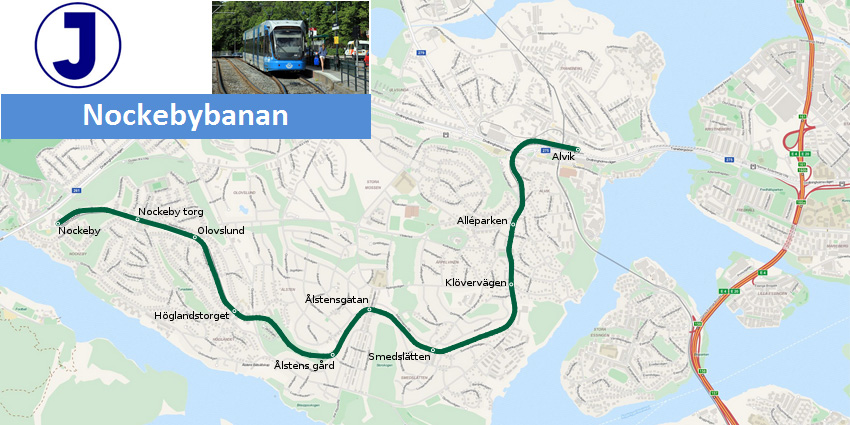

Nockebybanan (lit. 'the Nockeby Line') is a tram/light-rail line between Nockeby and Alvik in the western suburbs of Stockholm, Sweden. The 5.6 kilometers (3.5 mi) long line is part of the Storstockholms Lokaltrafik public transport network, and connects with the Stockholm Metro and Tvärbanan tram at Alvik metro station. The Nockebybanan, also known as line 12, is operated by Stockholms Spårvägar.

== History ==
The first part of the current line to Alléparken was opened in 1914, following the construction of a pontoon bridge across Tranebergssund. The line was then gradually extended westwards, reaching the current terminus at Nockeby in 1929. To the east, the line ran to Tegelbacken in central Stockholm.

The pontoon bridge was replaced in 1934 with the new Tranebergsbron. Planning for a Metro system started around this time, and in 1944 the Ängbybanan route was built from Alvik to Åkeshov (and later Islandstorget), operated initially with trams but designed as a grade-separated route for later conversion. Conversion happened in 1952, forming the western section of the present-day Stockholm Metro's Green Line. Consequently, the Nockebybanan was cut off from running into the city and became a feeder route for the Metro at Alvik.

Nockebybanan and Lidingöbanan were the only tram lines in the Stockholm region not to be withdrawn in conjunction with the switch to right-hand traffic in 1967. Since the line does not run on the street, and was simple and self-contained, and bi-directional rolling stock was available from the pre-metro tram lines, it was easier to convert to right-hand running than the rest of the network. Trams now run on the right from Nockeby to the penultimate station at Alléparken, where they cross over and run on the left into Alvik, permitting cross-platform interchange with the Metro.

By the 1990s, the line and rolling stock was in a poor state of repair and was widely expected to be dismantled and replaced with bus services. In 1975, the line had been re-numbered from 12 to 120, matching the numbering scheme used by local buses. The number was reverted to 12 later. However, a concerted local campaign saved the line and from June 1997 to June 1998 the line was closed and renovated, and new Bombardier Flexity Swift (A32) trams were introduced from 1999.

A running race in the surrounding neighbourhoods, Tolvanloppet takes both name and distance (12 km) from the line number.

== Lines ==
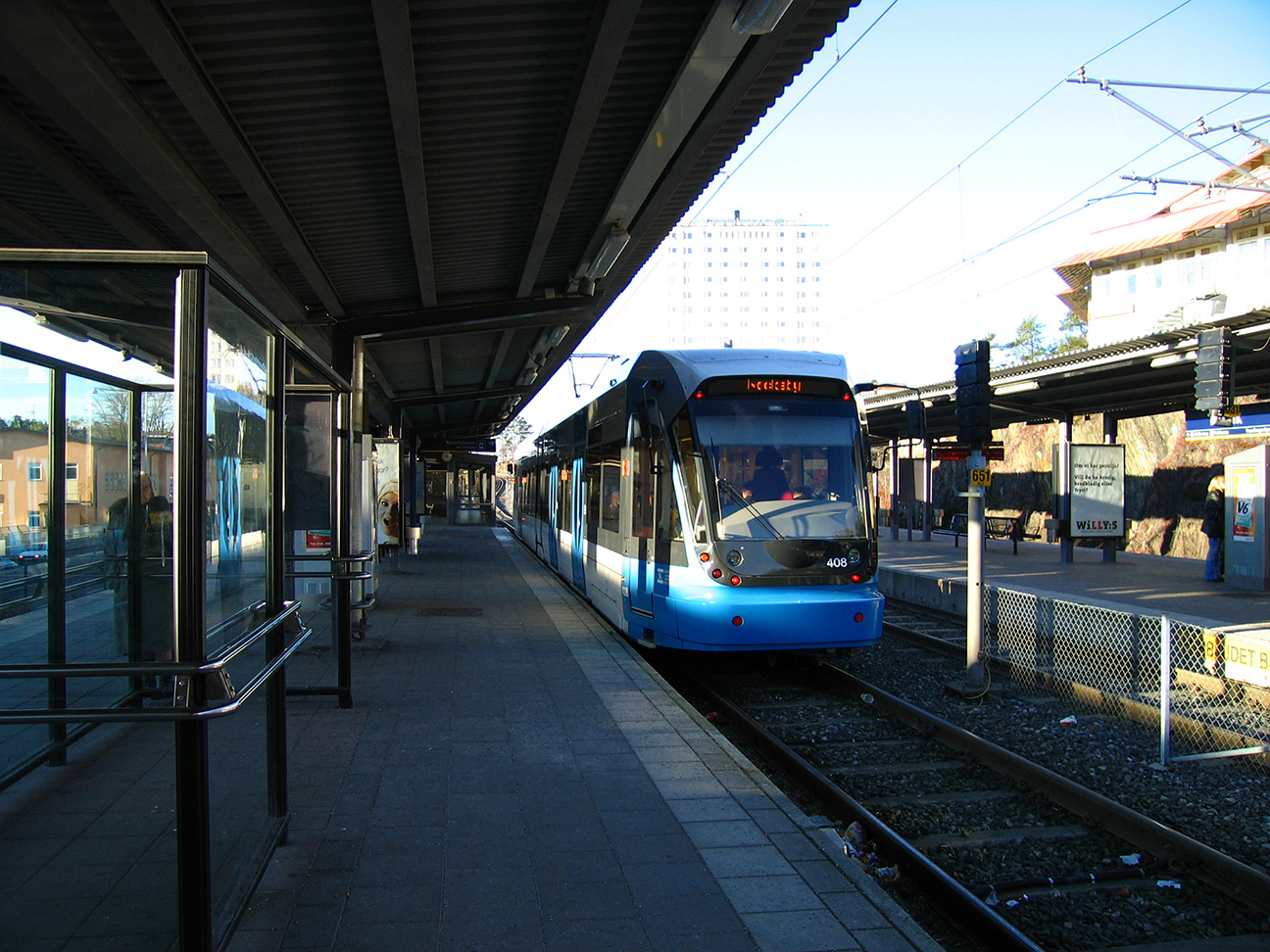
The Alvik metro station with cross-platform interchange to Nockebybanan. The Metro serves the outer tracks, and the Nockebybanan trams serve the inner, allowing a convenient transfer between the two lines.

Geographically accurate map of Nockebybanan

Nockebybanan has a single line (line 12) with ten stops, running from Nockeby to Alvik in Bromma borough. At Alvik metro station, passengers can use the cross-platform interchange provided to change to the Stockholm Metro's Green Line (lines 17, 18 and 19), or they can change to the Tvärbanan (lines 30 and 31) at lower-level platforms. The tramway is separated from roads, but has some level crossings. The journey time from Alvik to Nockeby is 14 minutes, with service intervals varying between 6 minutes in the morning and evening peaks, and 20 minutes during the evening and weekend. Typical weekday traffic is around 11,800 boarding passengers (as of 2019).

| Line | Stretch | Length | Stops | Passengers/day |
|---|---|---|---|---|
| 12 | Nockeby – Alvik | 5.6 km | 10 | 11,800 |

The line is served by 30 meter long Flexity Swift trams. The depot and traffic control center at Alvik are shared with Tvärbanan. As of 2018, new CAF Urbos trams (A35) were ordered for the Tvärbanan extension to Solna. But after Tvärbanan modernisation (23/3 to 2/10, 2017) all A35 were put on whole Tvärbanan, 28% are A35 and 72% are A32.

Trams access the Brommadepån depot at Alvik via tracks to the west of the station. These are shared with the metro (which uses reversing sidings in the depot for trains terminating at Alvik), and therefore are electrified with both overhead lines for trams and third rail for the Metro.

== See also ==
- Roslagsbanan
- Trams in Stockholm
- Public transport in Stockholm
- List of tram and light rail transit systems
