= Brommaplan metro station =

Stockholm Metro station

Brommaplan
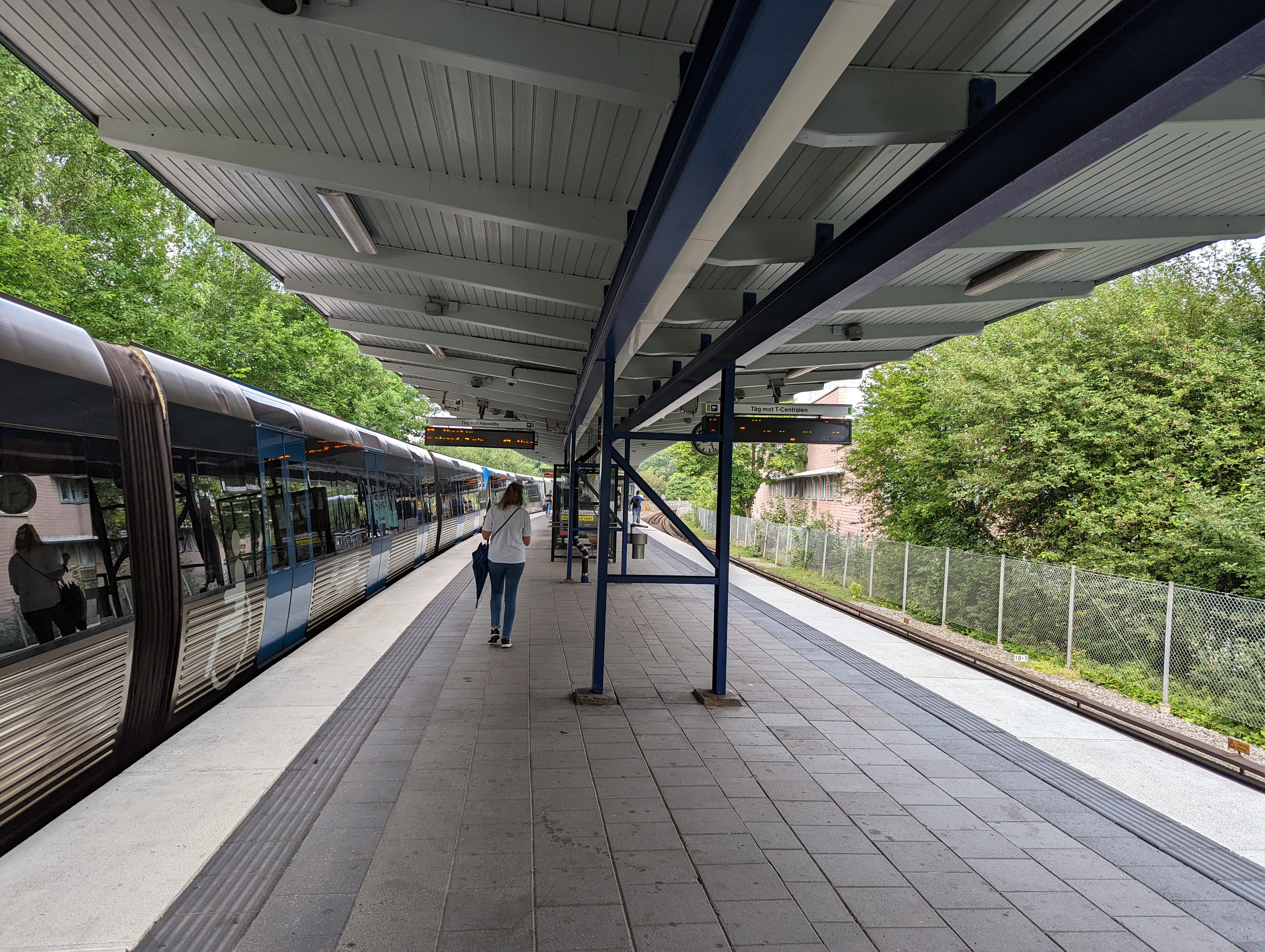
- Station platform, 2018

General information
- Coordinates: 59°20′18″N 17°56′22″E
- System: Stockholm Metro station
- Owner: Storstockholms Lokaltrafik
- Platforms: 1 island platform
- Tracks: 2

Construction
- Structure type: Elevated
- Accessible: Yes

Other information
- Station code: BMP

History
- Opened: 26 October 1952; 73 years ago

Passengers
- 2019: 13,400 boarding per weekday

Services
Preceding station	Stockholm Metro	Following station
Åkeshov Terminus	Line 17	Abrahamsberg towards Skarpnäck
Åkeshov towards Hässelby strand	Line 19	Abrahamsberg towards Hagsätra
Location
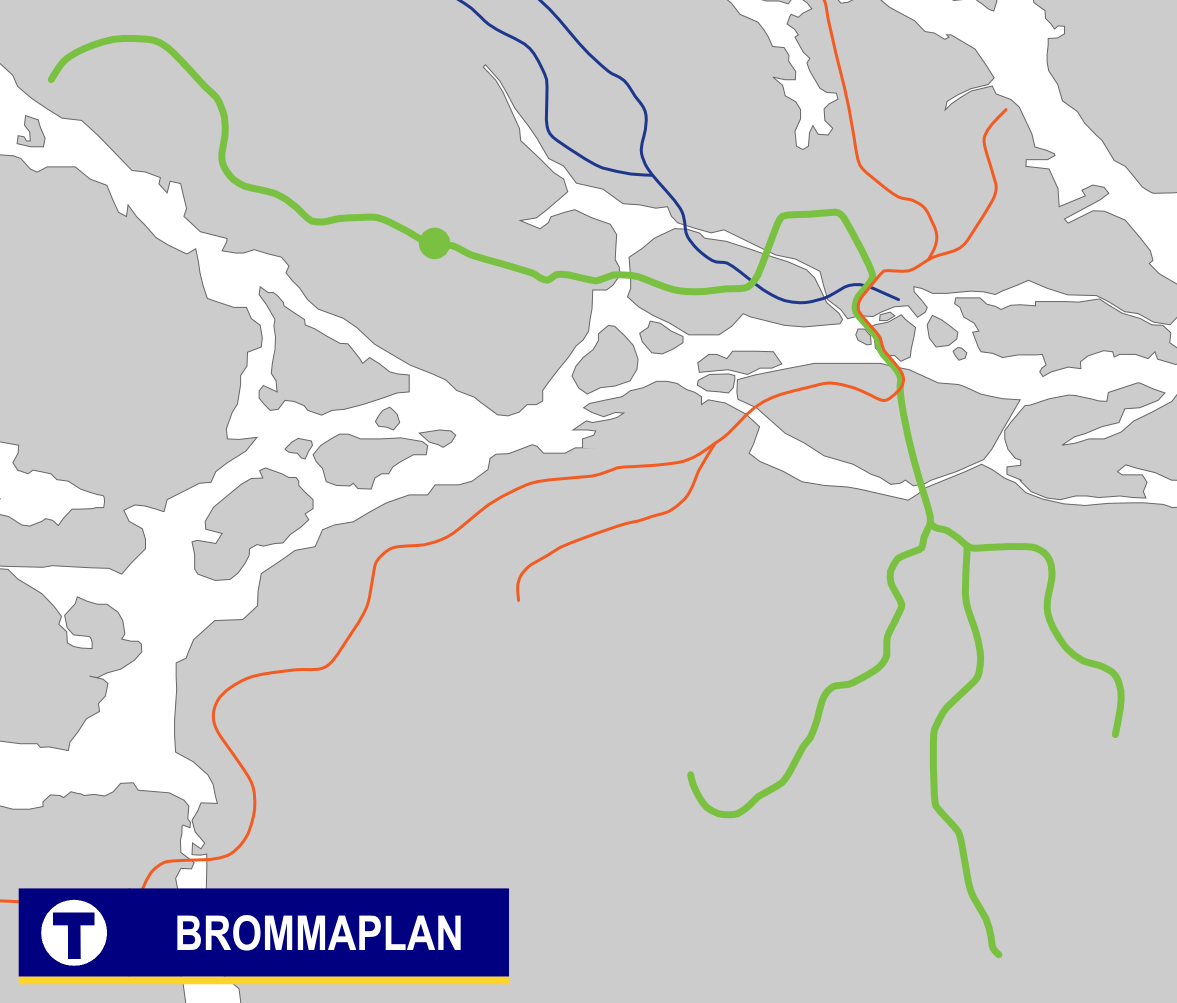

Brommaplan metro station is a station on the Green Line of the Stockholm Metro. It is located in the district of Riksby, which is part of the borough of Bromma in the west of the city of Stockholm. The station is elevated and has a single island platform, with access from a lower level station building. The distance to Slussen is 10.5 km (6.5 mi).

The station lies on the route of a line known as the Ängbybanan that formerly linked Alvik and Islandstorget. The Ängbybanan, which included the elevated tracks at Brommaplan now used by the metro, was designed and built for use by the future metro, but was operated from 1944 as part of line 11 of the Stockholm tramway. Brommaplan station was inaugurated as part of the metro on 26 October 1952 with the conversion of the Ängbybanan and its extension to form the metro line between Hötorget and Vällingby.

As part of Art in the Stockholm metro project, the station received a composition in glass, stainless sheet metal and aluminium referring to the history of aviation and the nearby Bromma Airport. The artwork was created by Peter Svedberg and installed in 1996

== Gallery ==
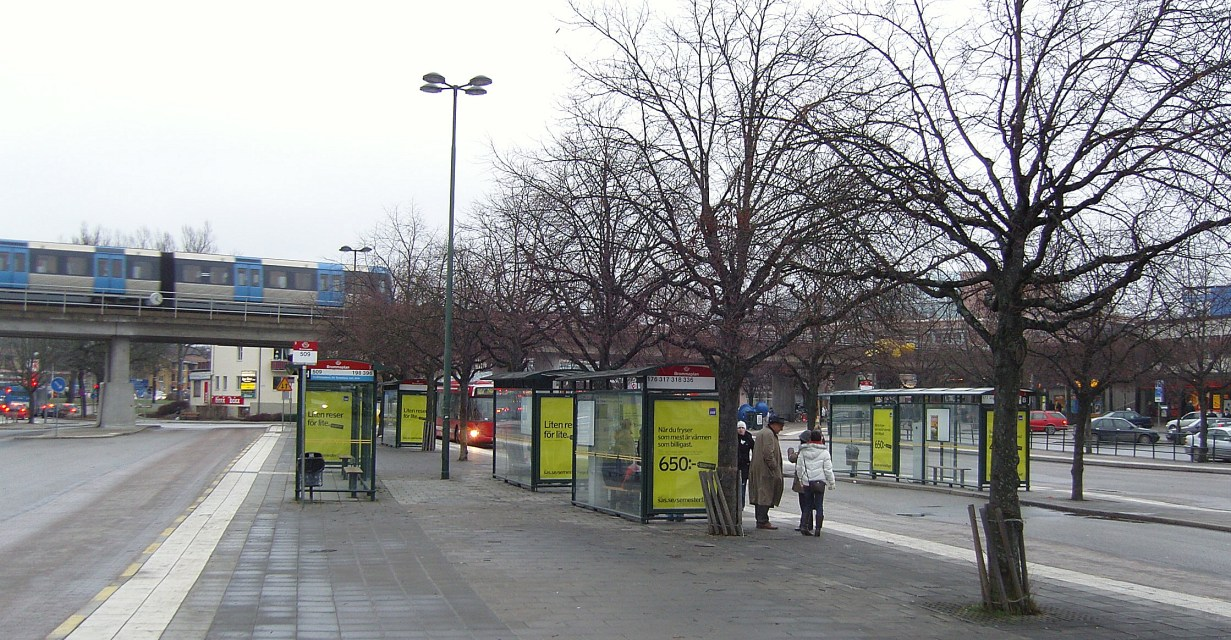
Elevated tracks across Brommaplan, 2007

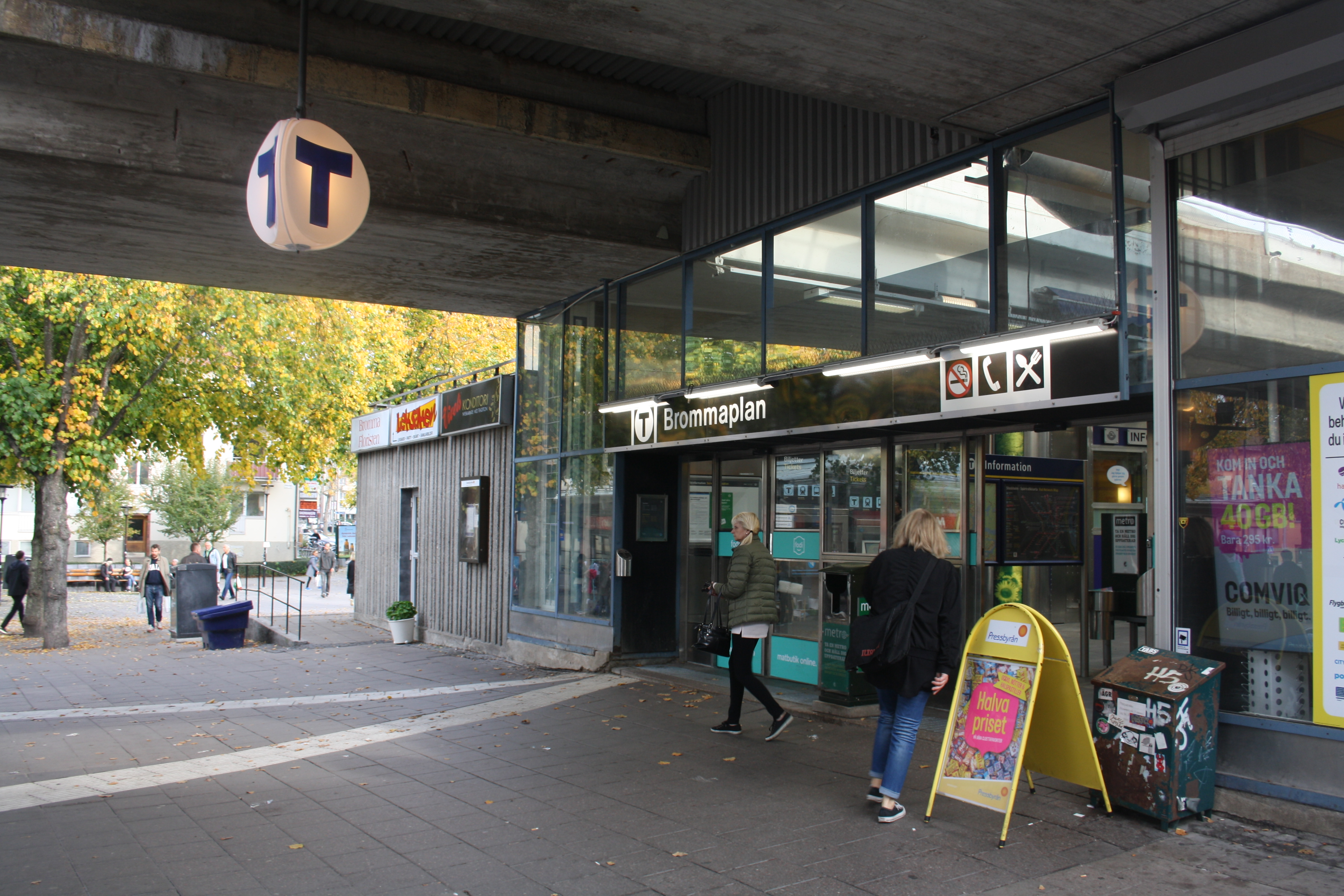
Entrance to the station, 2018

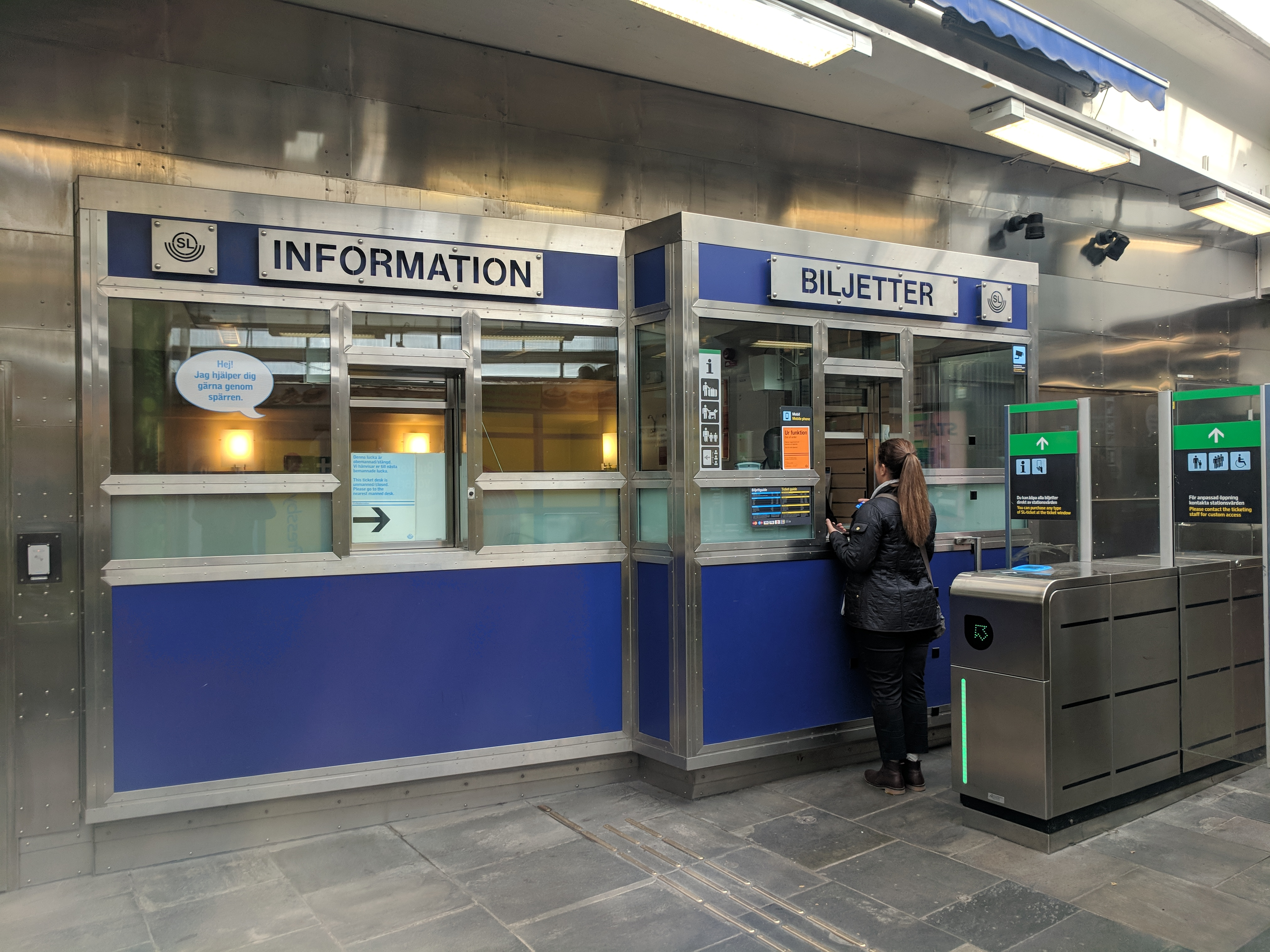
inside the station, 2018

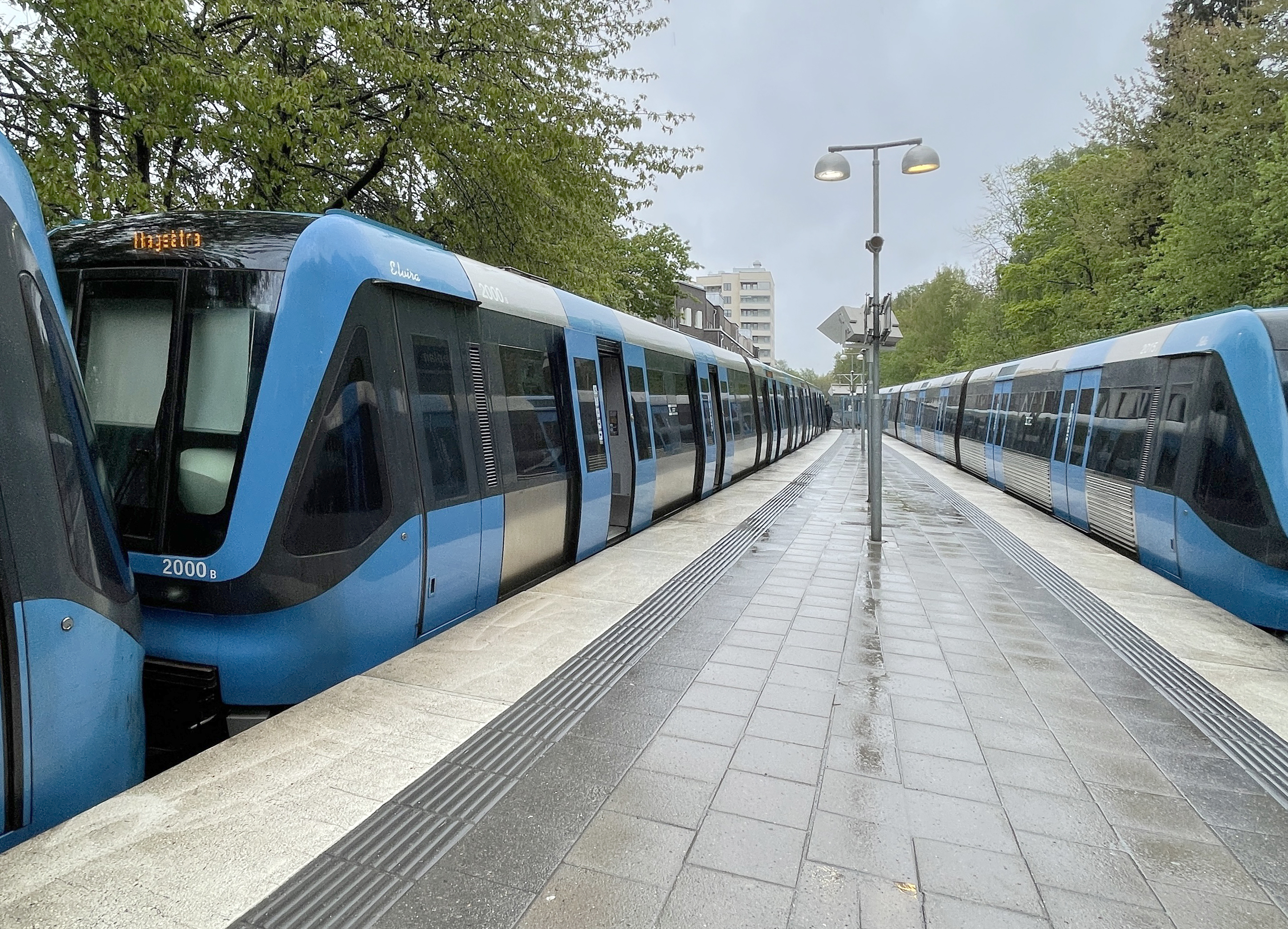
The platforms, 2021
