= Nockeby =

District in Stockholm, Sweden

Coordinates: 59.328411°N 17.922997°E

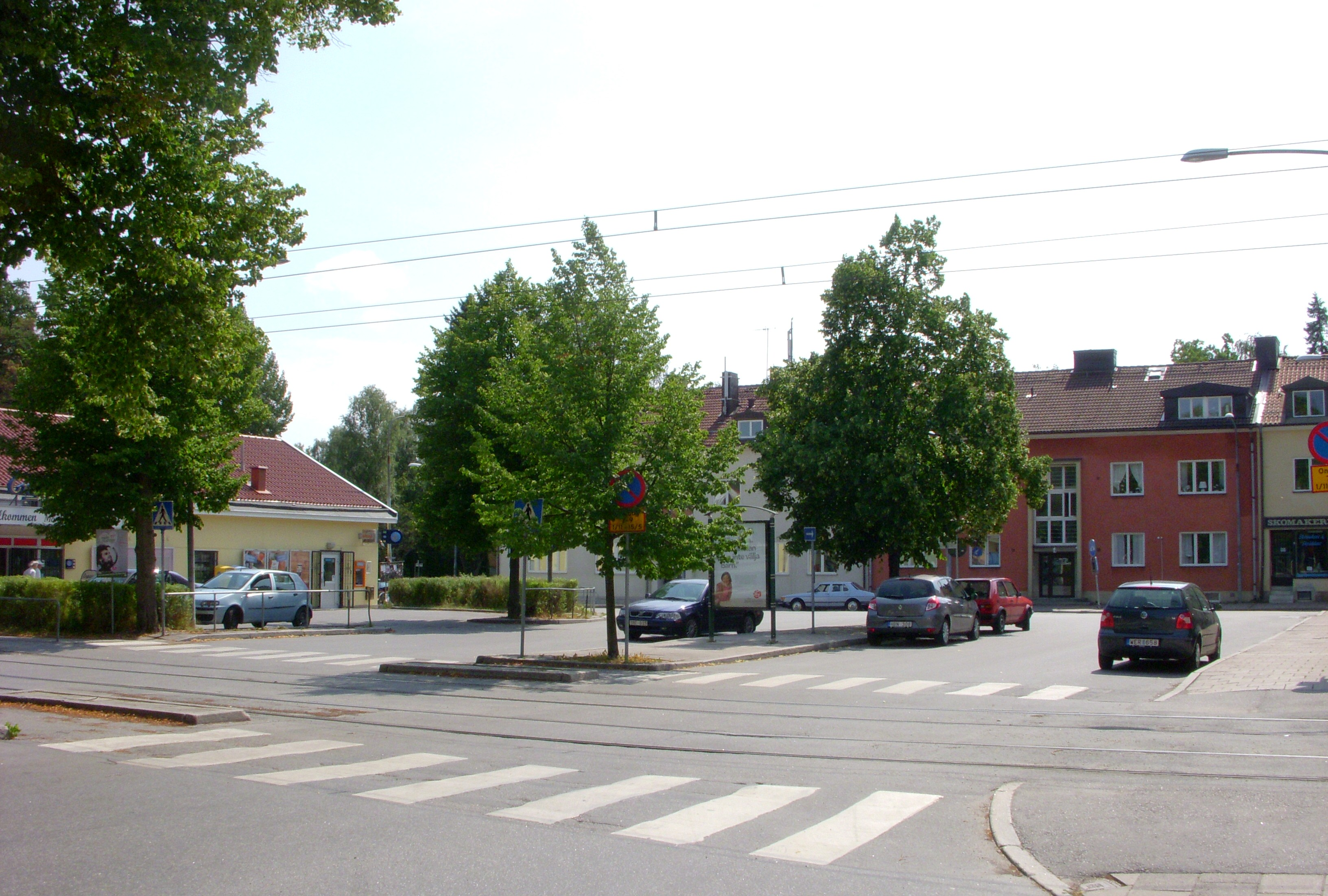
Nockeby

Nockeby is a residential district in western Stockholm and part of the Bromma borough.

It is part of the Bromma district and has an area of 98 hectares.

== See also ==
- Nockeby Light Rail
