= Åkeshov metro station =

Stockholm Metro station

Åkeshov
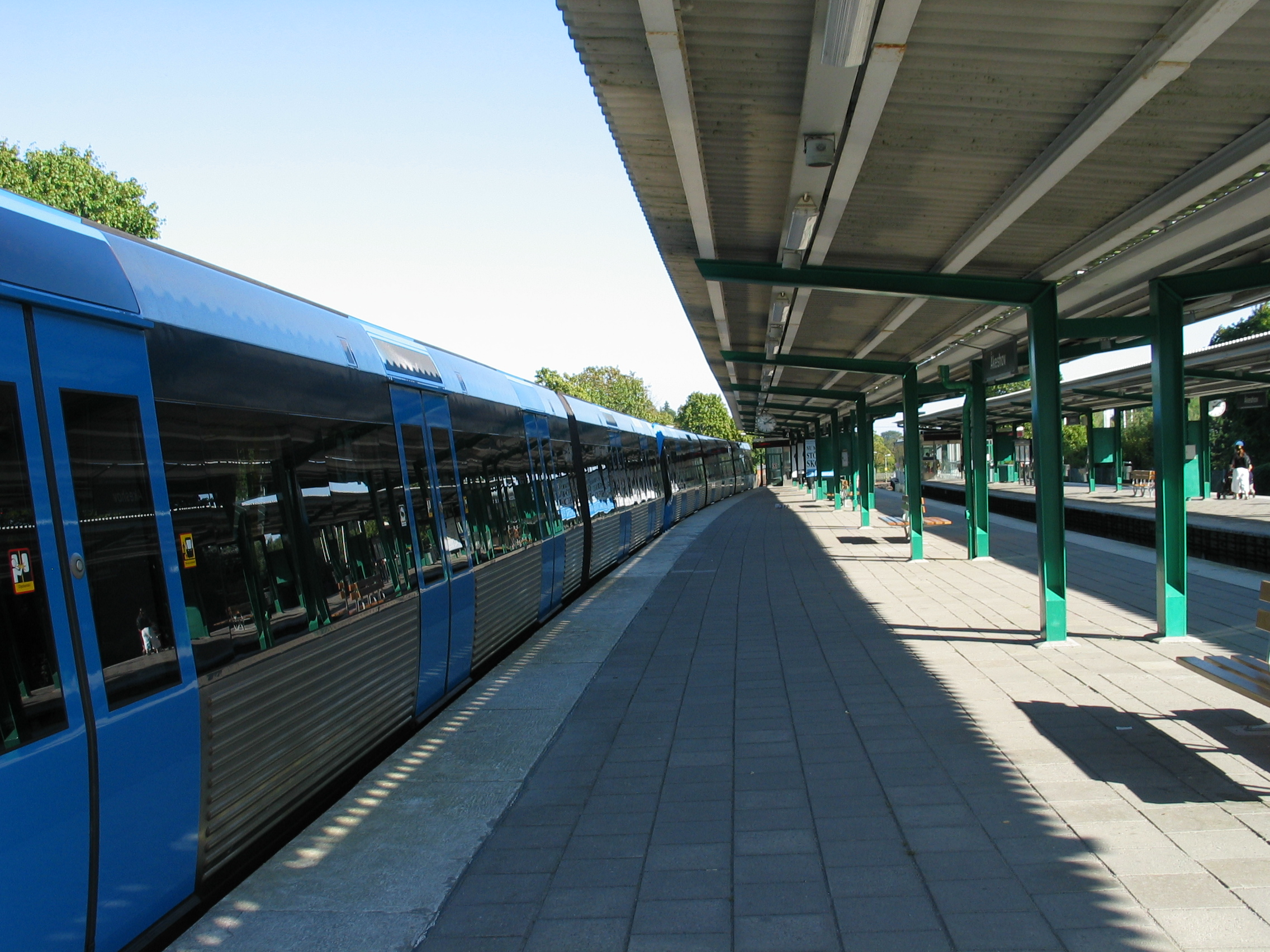
- Station platform, 2006

General information
- Coordinates: 59°20′31″N 17°55′26″E
- System: Stockholm Metro station
- Platforms: 2 island platforms
- Tracks: 3

Construction
- Structure type: At grade
- Depth: 0 m (0 ft)
- Accessible: Yes

Other information
- Station code: ÅKH

History
- Opened: 26 October 1952; 73 years ago

Passengers
- 2019: 2,450 boarding per weekday

Services
Preceding station	Stockholm Metro	Following station
Terminus	Line 17	Brommaplan towards Skarpnäck
Ängbyplan towards Hässelby strand	Line 19	Brommaplan towards Hagsätra
Location
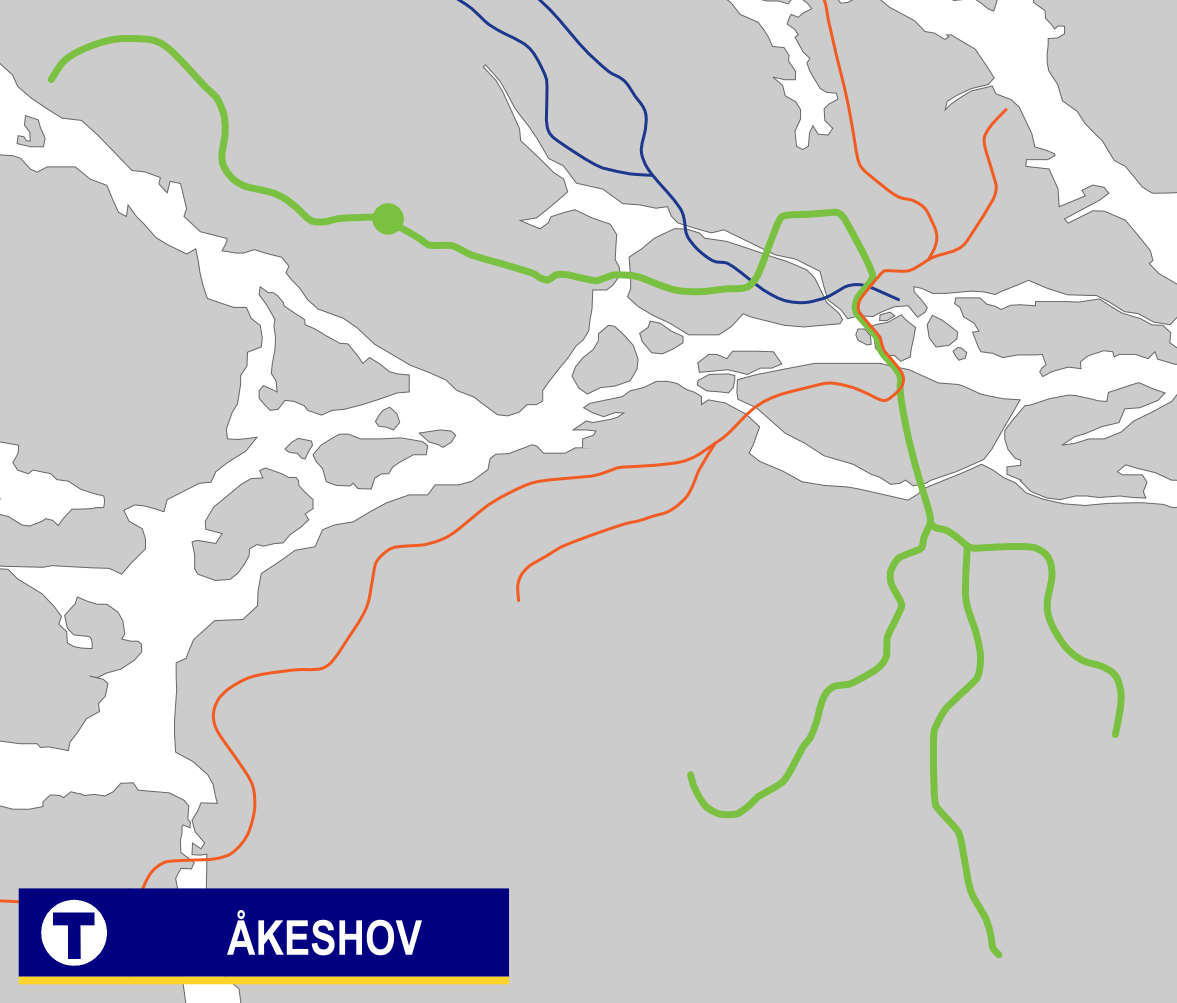

Åkeshov is a station on the Green Line of the Stockholm Metro. It is located in the borough of Bromma in the west of the city of Stockholm. The station is at ground level, has two island platforms flanking three through tracks, and is one of the intermediate termini along the northern section of the Green line, with Line 17 trains normally terminating. Access is by way of a pedestrian underpass that passes under both the Metro line and the adjacent Bergslagsvägen street.

== Location and history ==
The station lies on the route of a line known as the Ängbybanan that formerly linked Alvik and Islandstorget. The Ängbybanan was designed and built for use by the future metro, but was operated from 1944 as part of line 11 of the Stockholm tramway. Åkeshov station was inaugurated as part of the metro on 26 October 1952 with the conversion of the Ängbybanan and its extension to form the metro line between Hötorget and Vällingby.

=== Bronze sculpture ===
As part of Art in the Stockholm Metro project, the station features a bronze sculpture in the ticket hall symbolizing non-violence. The sculpture was created by Carl Fredrik Reuterswärd in 1998.

== Gallery ==
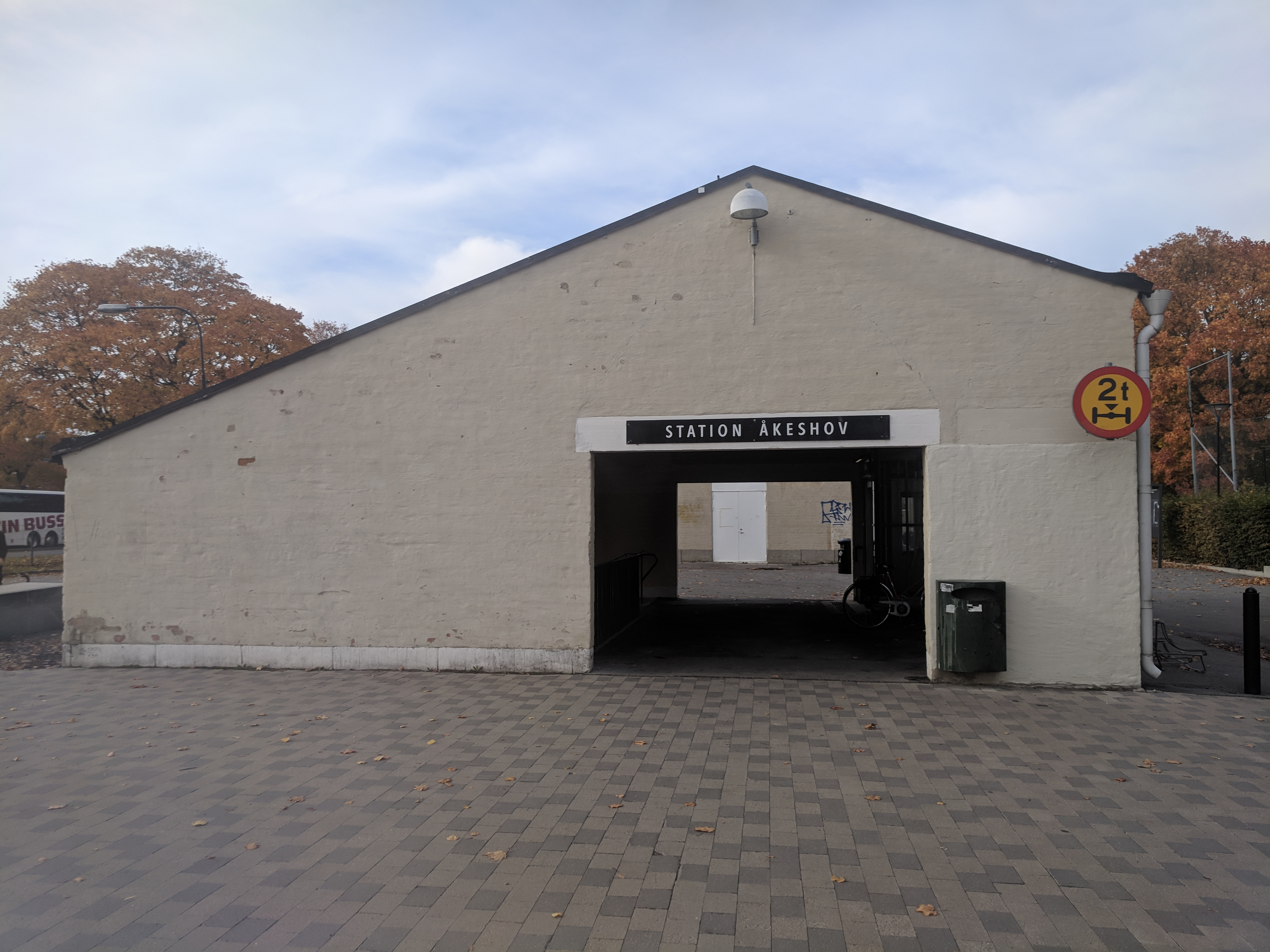
Entrance on the north side of Bergslagsvägen, 2018

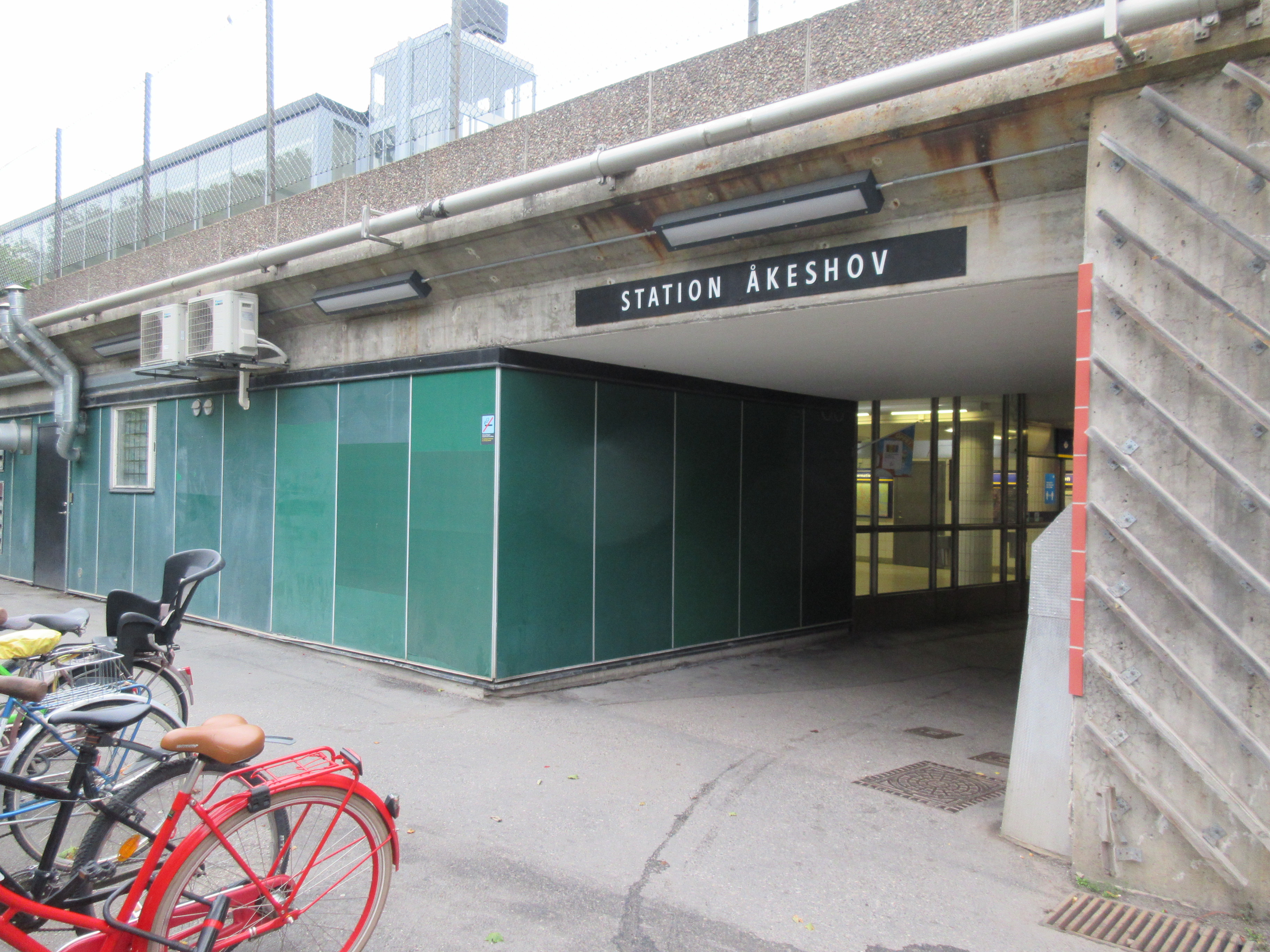
Entrance on the south side of the station, 2021

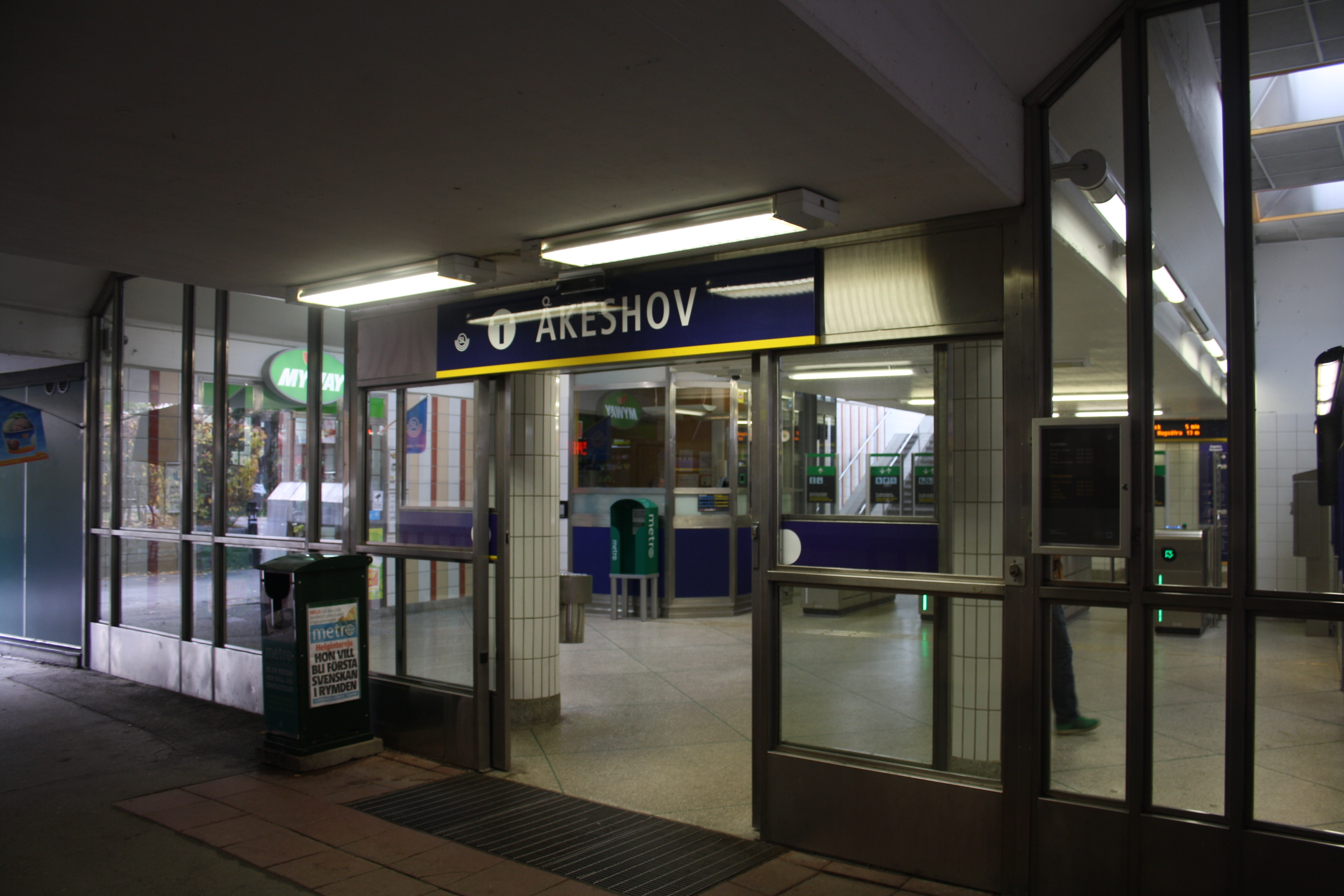
Station interior, 2018

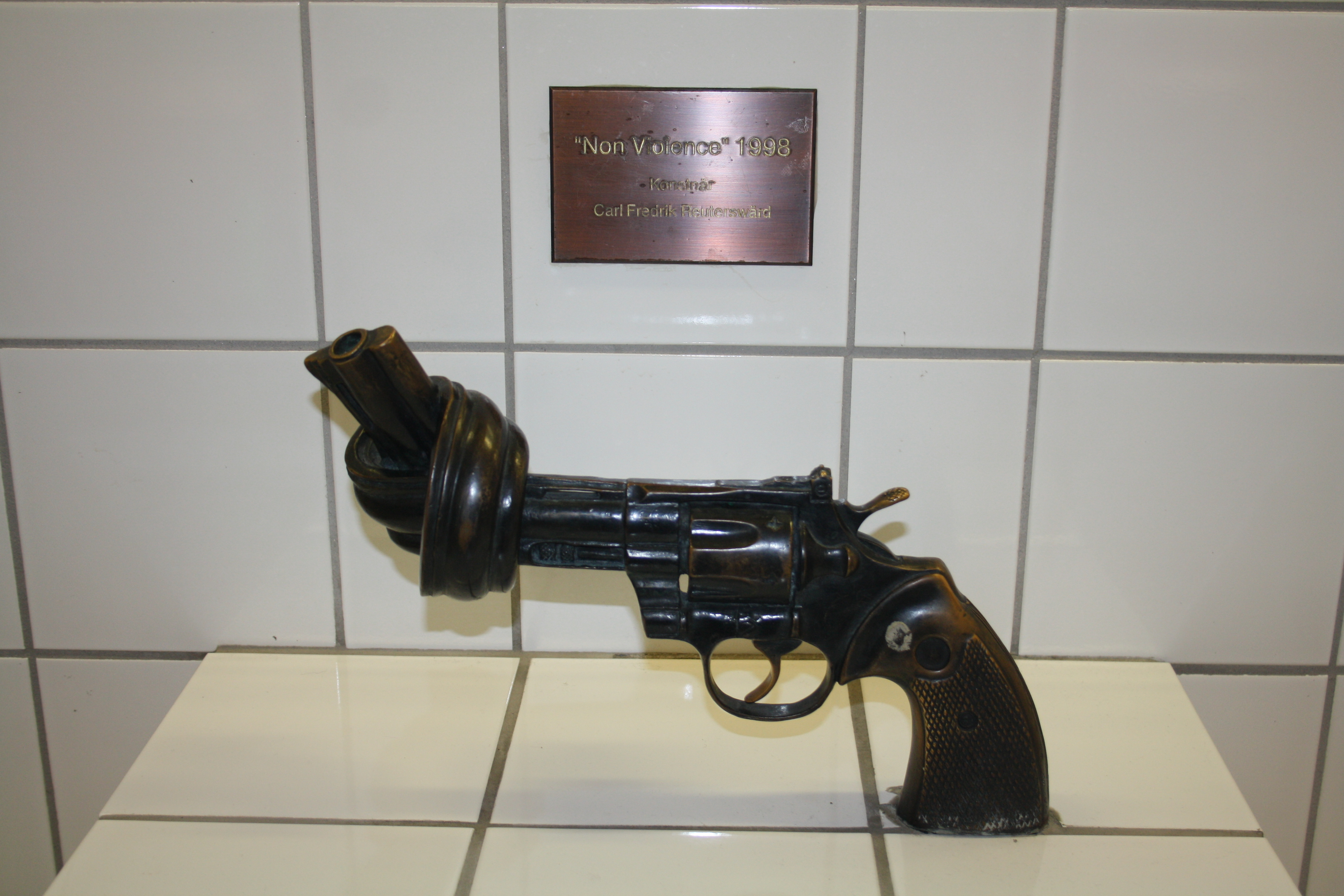
Sculpture Non-Violence, 2018

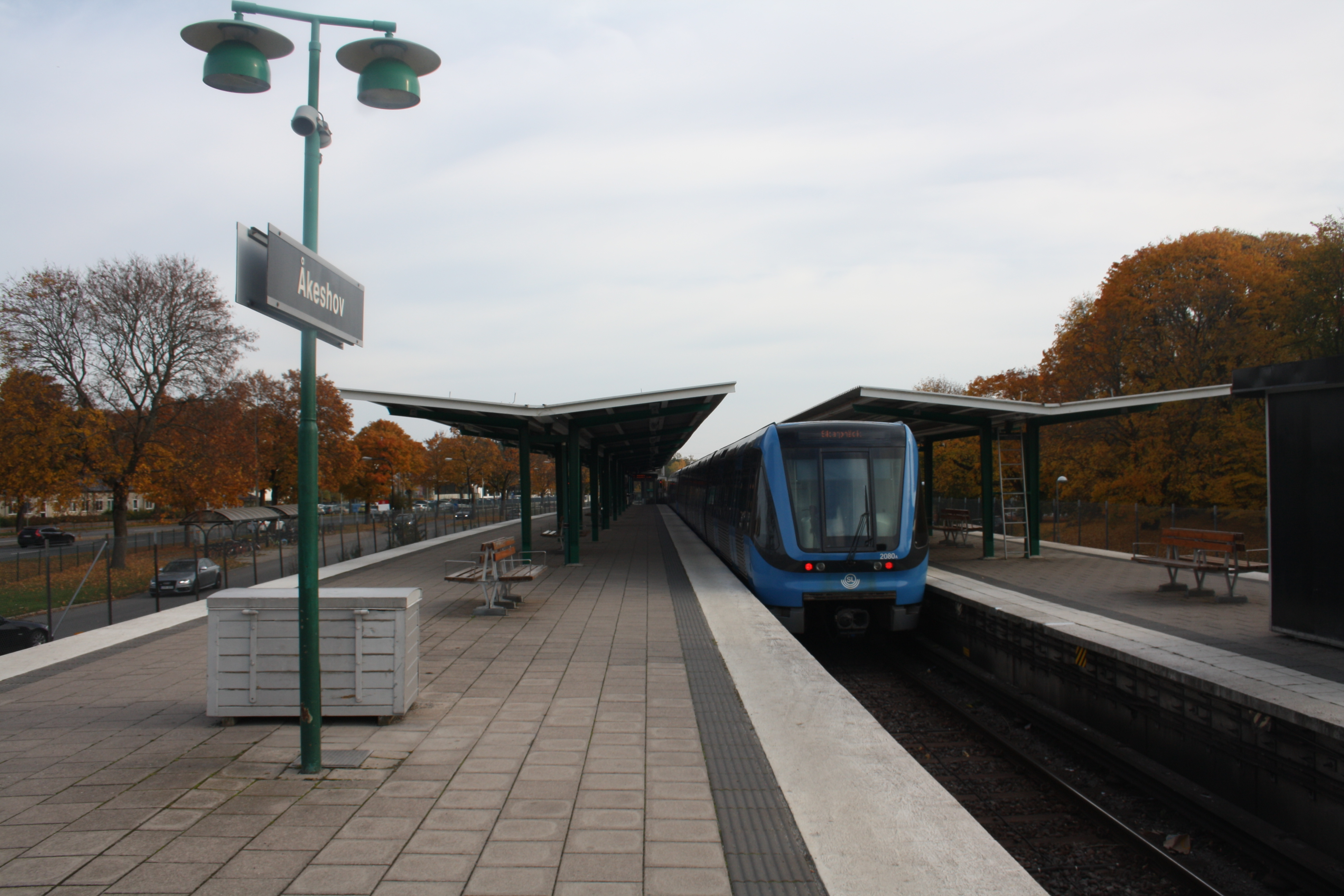
Twin platforms with terminating train, 2018
