= Islandstorget metro station =

Stockholm Metro station

Islandstorget
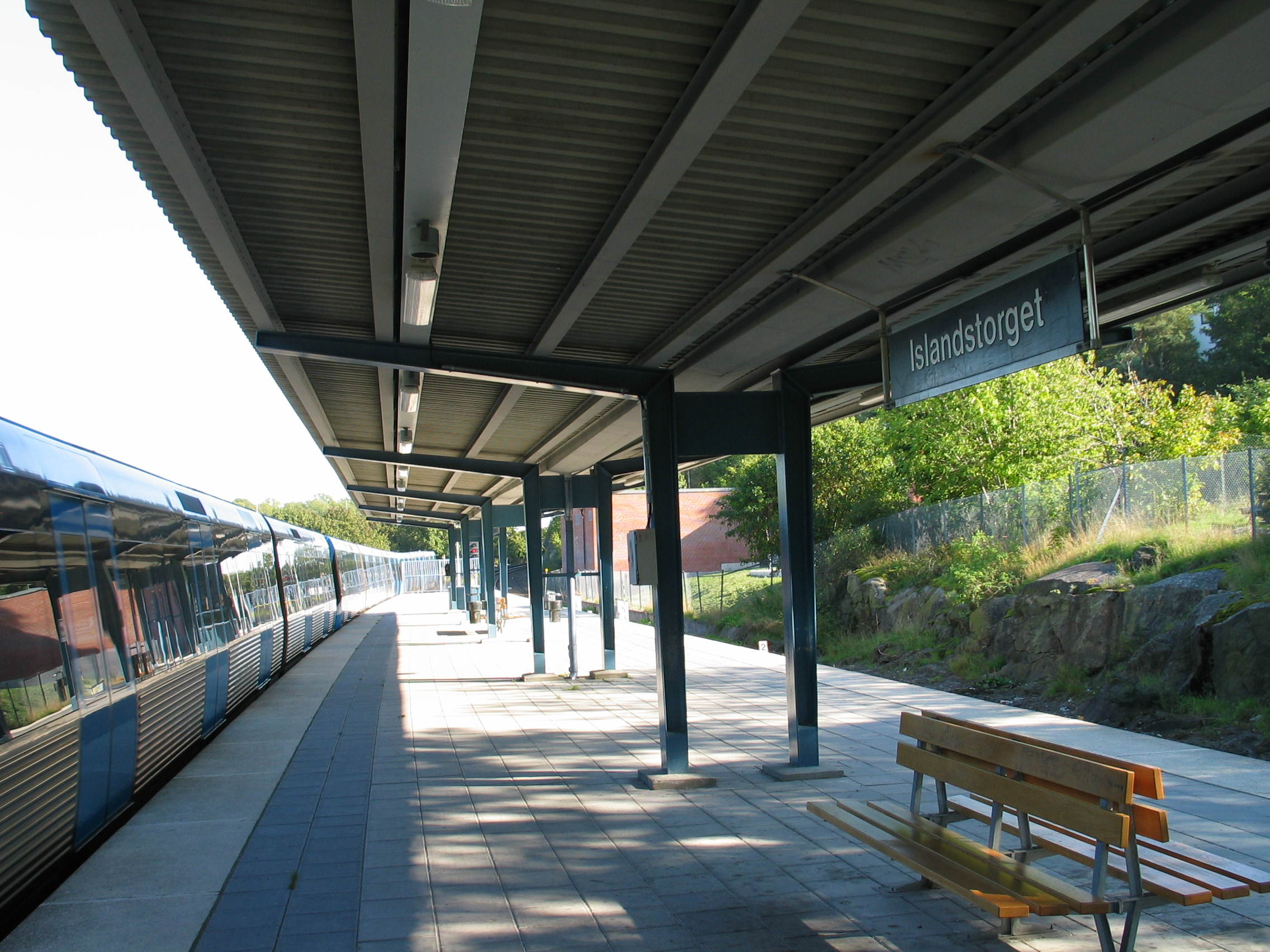
- Station platform, 2006

General information
- Coordinates: 59°20′46″N 17°53′34.5″E
- System: Stockholm Metro station
- Owner: Storstockholms Lokaltrafik
- Platforms: 1 island platform
- Tracks: 2

Construction
- Structure type: At grade
- Accessible: Yes

Other information
- Station code: ILT

History
- Opened: 26 October 1952; 73 years ago

Passengers
- 2019: 3,450 boarding per weekday

Services
Preceding station	Stockholm Metro	Following station
Blackeberg towards Hässelby strand	Line 19	Ängbyplan towards Hagsätra
Location
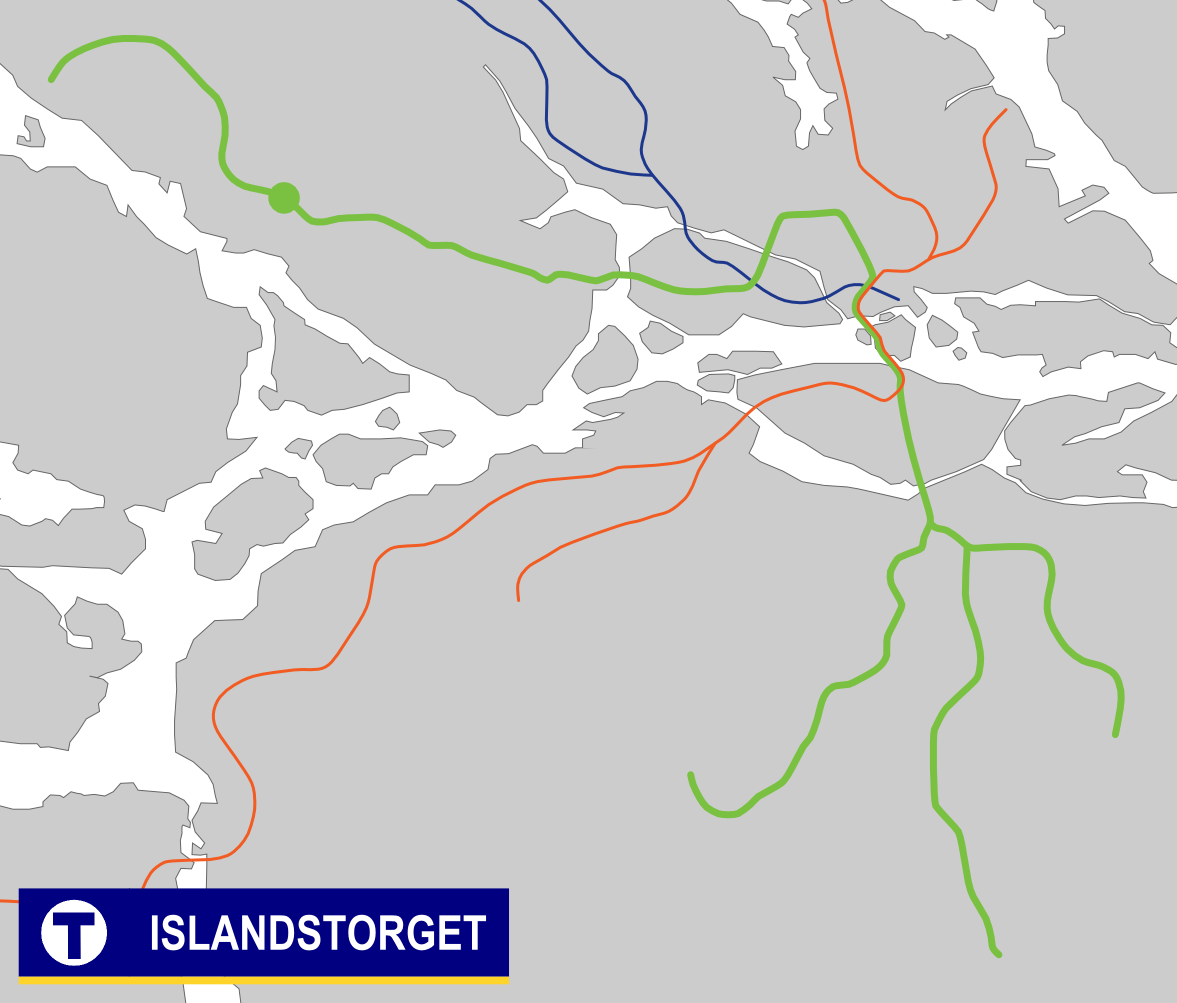

Islandstorget is a station in the Stockholm Metro on the Green Line. It is located in the district of Södra Ängby, which is part of the borough of Bromma in the west of the city of Stockholm. The station is above ground with a single island platform. The entrance is from Blackebergsvägen, which passes over the line. On a workday there are some 3,450 passengers who travel from Islandstorget.

The site of the station was the western terminus of a line known as the Ängbybanan that ran from Alvik. The Ängbybanan was designed and built for use by the future metro, but was operated from 1944 as part of line 11 of the Stockholm tramway. Islandstorget station was inaugurated as part of the metro on 26 October 1952 with the conversion of the Ängbybanan and its extension to form the metro line between Hötorget and Vällingby.

== Gallery ==
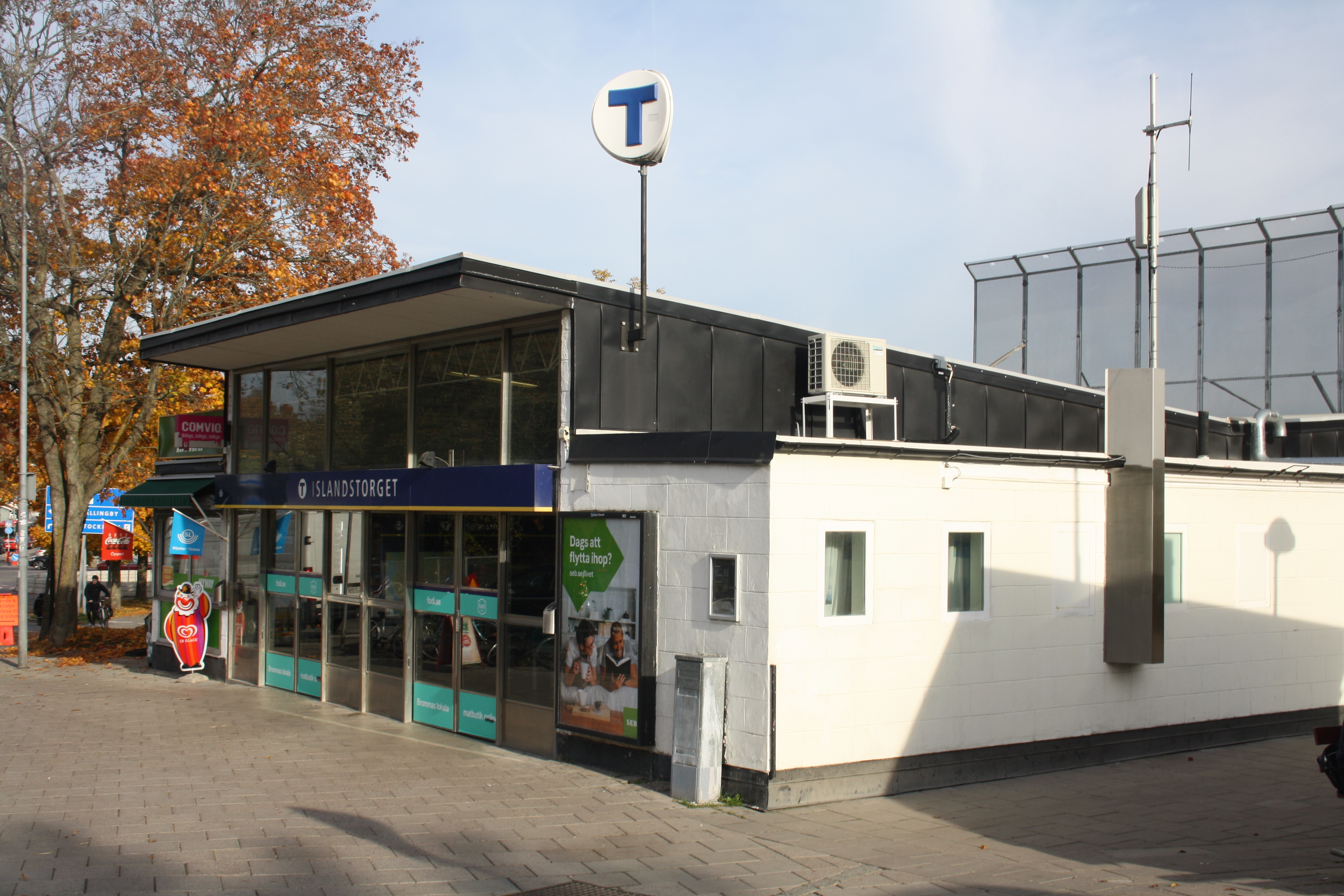
Station building, 2018

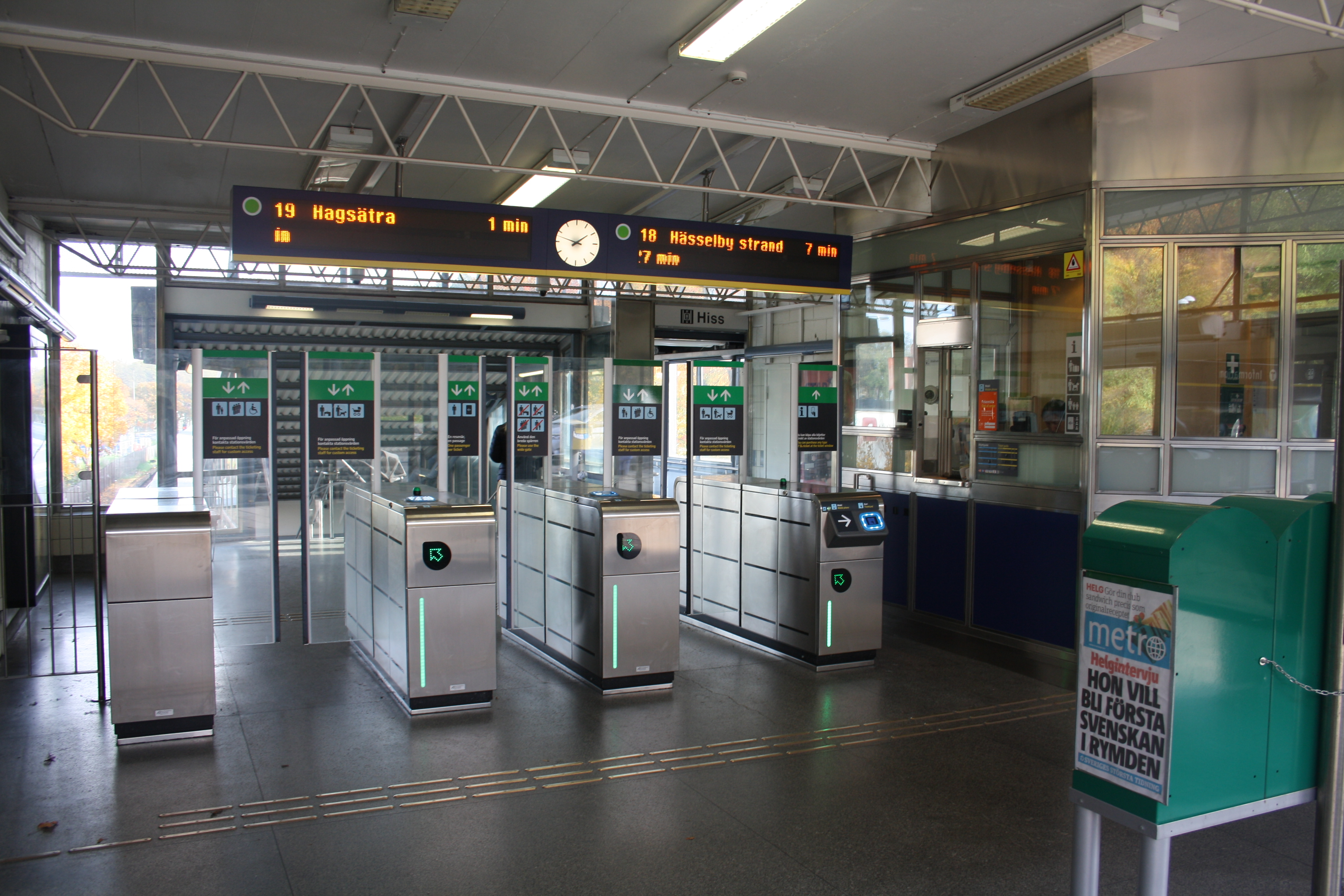
Station interior, 2018
