= Alvik =

Urban district in Stockholm, Sweden

- Residential district
- Interactive map of Alvik
- Country: Sweden

Alvik is a residential district in western Stockholm municipality and part of the Bromma borough.

== See also ==
- 08 Stockholm Human Rights
- Alvik metro station
