= Slussen bus terminal =

Underground bus terminal in Södermalm, Stockholm, Sweden

Slussen bus terminal Slussens bussterminal
- Entrance under construction in 2025

General information
- Location: Katarinaberget; Södermalm, Stockholm; Sweden
- Elevation: 10-35 meters below ground
- Owner: Region Stockholm
- Operator: Storstockholms Lokaltrafik (SL)
- Bus routes: SL services to Nacka and Värmdö
- Bus stands: 17 departure bays 6 arrival bays
- Connections: Slussen metro station (Stockholm Metro)

Construction
- Structure type: Underground

History
- Opening: Late 2026

Slussen bus terminal (Swedish: Slussens bussterminal) is an underground bus terminal in Södermalm, Stockholm, Sweden. It is adjacent to Slussen metro station, which serves the Stockholm Metro and is also the terminus of the Saltsjöbanan.

The new terminal forms part of the redevelopment of Slussen and is intended to serve SL bus services connecting central Stockholm with Nacka and Värmdö in Stockholm County. The terminal is expected to open before Christmas 2026, although an exact opening date has not been announced.

The terminal was completed by Stockholm Municipality and handed over to Region Stockholm on 30 September 2026. It has 17 departure bays, six arrival bays and a separate indoor passenger waiting hall. Preparations and operational testing are being carried out before passenger services begin.

The new facility replaces the former Slussen bus terminal, which operated from 1971 until 2018. The original terminal was located beneath the Slussen road interchange. Following its closure, bus services were transferred to temporary terminals while the underground terminal was constructed.

== History ==
=== Original bus terminal (1971–2018) ===
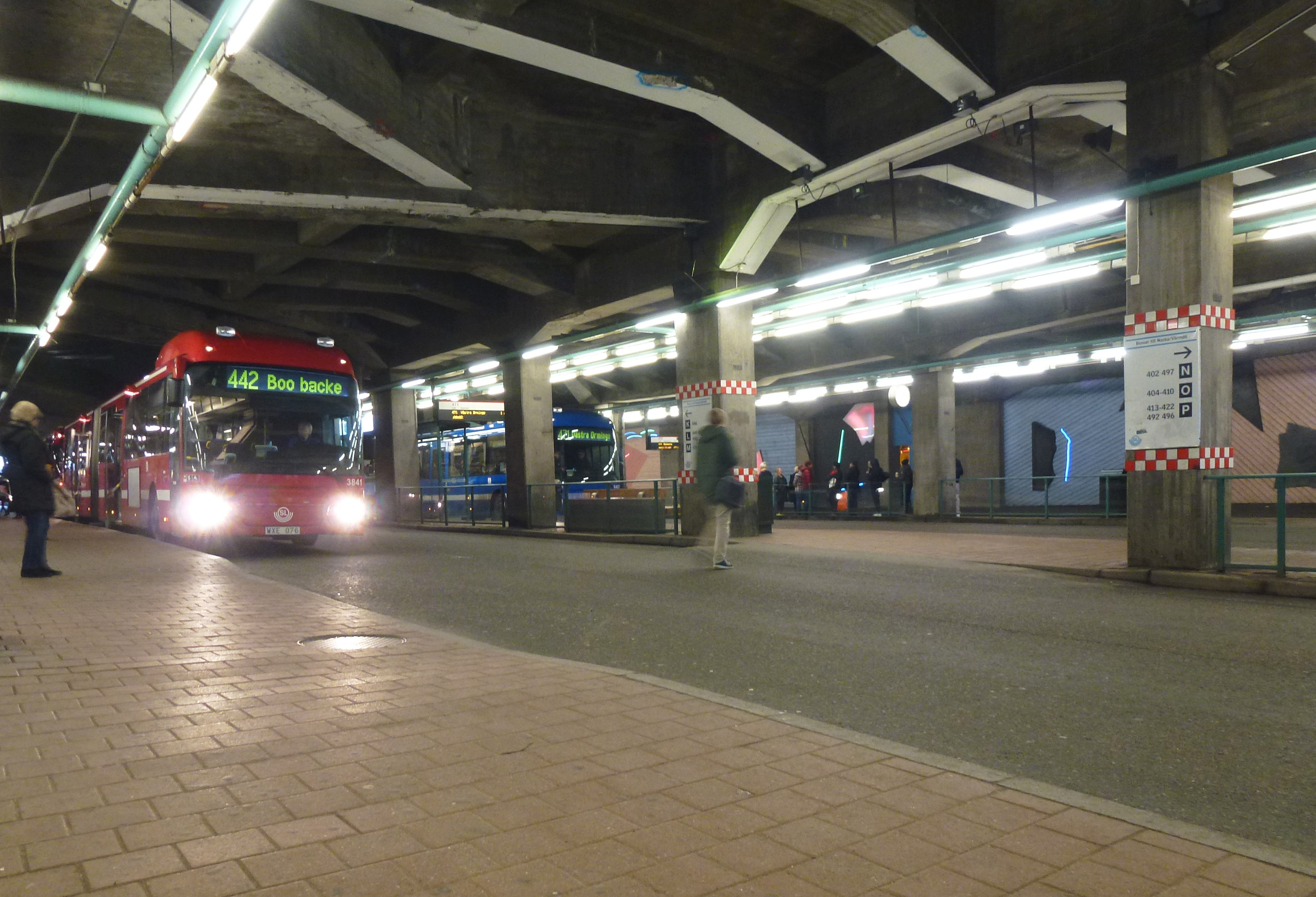
The original bus terminal in 2014

The original bus terminal opened in 1971 on the site of a former railway marshalling yard near Saltsjöbanan. It served regional bus services to Nacka and Värmdö, with connections to Slussen metro station and Saltsjöbanan.

The terminal underwent a renovation between 1985 and 1987, when a noise barrier designed by artist Gun Gordillo was installed. The terminal had approximately 47,500 departing passengers per day in 2015, making it the busiest bus terminal in Sweden.

The terminal closed on 2 May 2018 as part of the Slussen redevelopment project.

=== Temporary terminals (2018–present) ===
The first temporary bus terminal in October 2023

Following the closure of the original terminal on 2 May 2018, bus services to Nacka and Värmdö were transferred to a temporary terminal at Stadsgården. The arrangement was intended to remain in place while the new underground terminal was constructed.

On 19 August 2024, services moved to a second temporary terminal at Stadsgårdskajen, near Fotografiska. It continued to serve regional buses to Nacka and Värmdö while construction of the permanent terminal was completed.

The second temporary terminal is located approximately 780 metres from the metro station, requiring passengers to walk between the bus terminal and the metro and other transport connections. The longer distance was associated with a decline in bus commuting between Nacka and Värmdö and Slussen. During January to May 2025, the average number of weekday journeys fell by 29.2% compared with the same period in 2024. SL attributed part of the change to passengers using alternative routes, including other bus stops and commuter boats.

== New bus terminal ==
=== Planning and construction ===
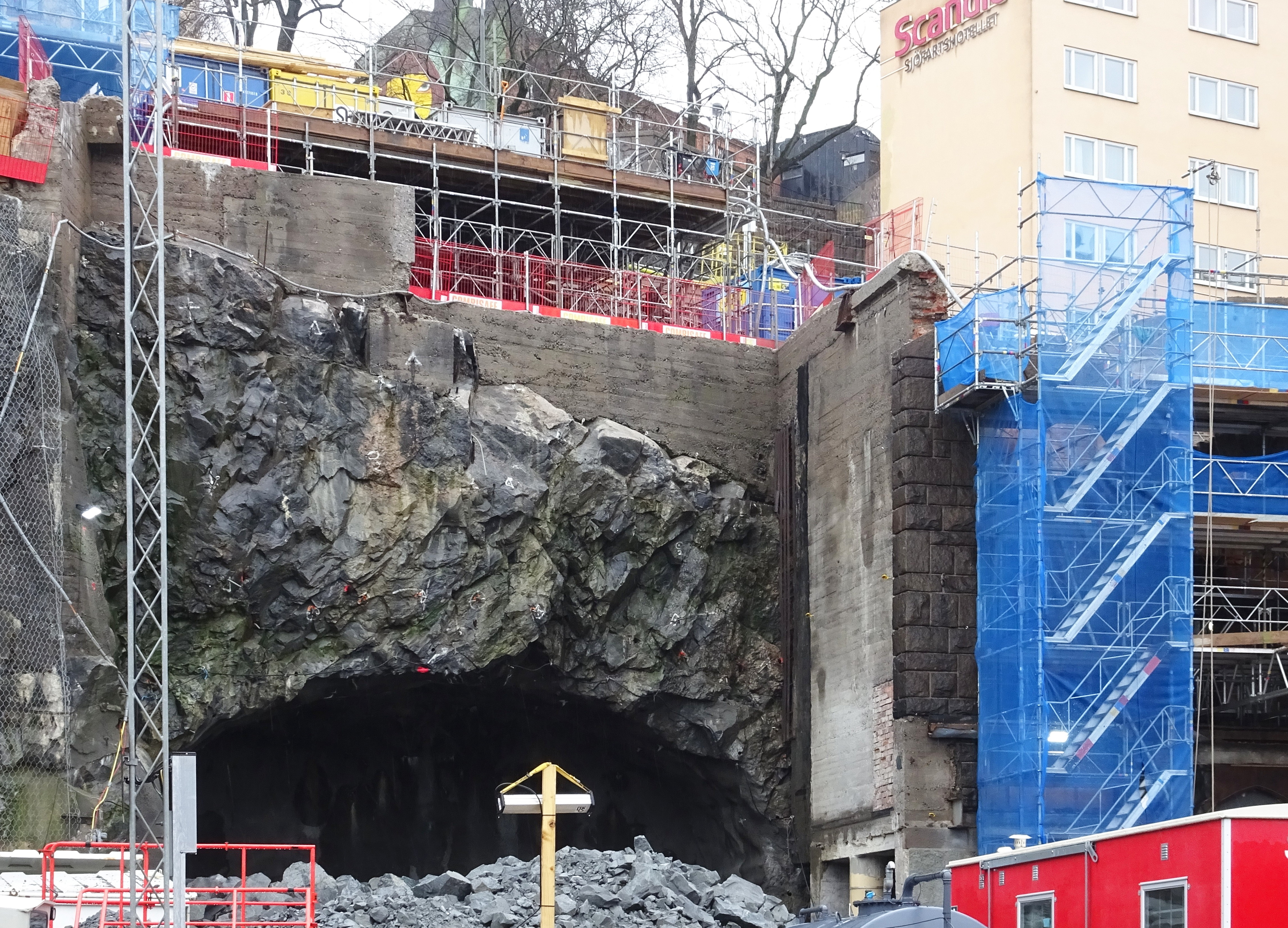
Construction work for the new terminal at Stadsgårdskajen, March 2019.

Inside the terminal in June 2023

The new bus terminal is part of the wider Slussen redevelopment project and was planned as a permanent replacement for the former bus terminal. The detailed development plan was upheld on 4 May 2018, when the Land and Environment Court of Appeal declined to grant leave to appeal.

Stockholm Municipality was responsible for constructing the terminal. Region Stockholm, through its transport administration and SL, is responsible for its operation. The project has been financed jointly by Stockholm Municipality, Region Stockholm and the Swedish state, and has cost 6.5 billion kronor.

Construction took approximately eight years and involved excavating around 330,000 cubic metres of rock from Katarinaberget. Blasting began in 2019 and ended in 2021. The terminal was built inside the rock, with buses accessing it through a tunnel from Stadsgårdsleden.

Stockholm Municipality completed the construction and handed the facility over to Region Stockholm on 30 September 2026. The handover marked the start of preparations and testing of the terminal and its systems.

=== Design and facilities ===
The underground terminal is designed as a docking terminal, with a separate indoor waiting hall for passengers. This separates passengers from bus traffic.

The terminal has 17 departure bays and six arrival bays, with two additional bays that can also be used for arrivals. There is also space for up to 17 buses waiting between services. The waiting hall includes a kiosk and public toilets.

Art is integrated into the terminal's design. The artwork Den röda tråden (The Red Thread), by artist Gunilla Klingberg, consists of three parts inspired by the textile heritage of Södermalm and Almgren's Silk Weaving Mill. These include a sculptural wall at the eastern entrance, a patterned terrazzo floor in the waiting hall and an illuminated wall in the passage connecting the hall to the metro.

=== Entrances and connections ===
Bus entrance on Stadsgårdsleden during construction

The terminal has entrances from Katarinavägen and Stadsgårdskajen, as well as pedestrian connections to the adjoining metro station and Saltsjöbanan platform. The bus tunnel connects the terminal to Stadsgårdsleden, near Fotografiska. The walking distance from the farthest arrival bay to the metro is approximately 300 metres.

=== Opening ===
Following the handover in September 2026, Region Stockholm began preparations for the terminal's operation in cooperation with the traffic operator and other parties. These include inspections, staff training, operational preparations and tests of the terminal and its traffic systems. A full-scale exercise and a test involving buses operating in the terminal without passengers are also planned before it opens.

In November 2026, traffic regional councillor Jakop Dalunde said that the terminal was expected to open before Christmas 2026. An exact opening date had not yet been announced.

== Services ==
Until the extension of the Stockholm metro to Nacka is completed, the new terminal is intended to serve SL bus services from both Nacka and Värmdö. Following the metro extension, it is expected to be used primarily by buses from Värmdö, together with a smaller number of services from Nacka.

== See also ==
- Cityterminalen
- Public transport in Stockholm
