= Järla metro station =

Metro station in Stockholm County, Sweden

Järla
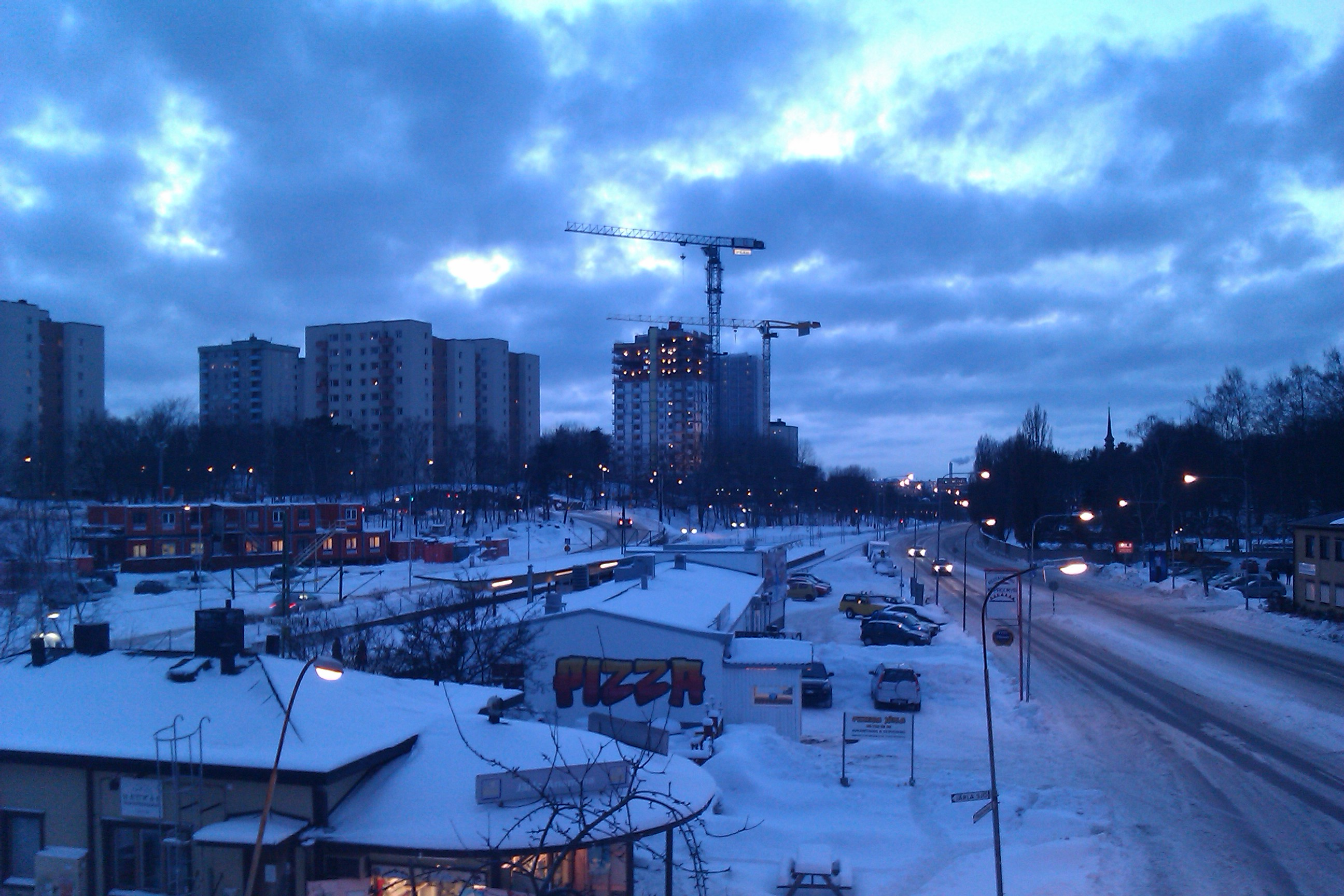
- The station area before construction works

General information
- Location: Järla, Nacka, Stockholm
- System: Future Stockholm Metro station
- Line: Blue Line
- Platforms: 1 island platform
- Tracks: 2

Construction
- Structure type: Underground
- Depth: 40 m (130 ft)

History
- Opening: 2030

Services
Preceding station: Sickla
Proceeding station: Nacka (Terminus)

Järla is a future station on the Stockholm Metro's Blue Line in Nacka municipality. Scheduled to open in 2030, the station is part of the Blue Line extension from Kungsträdgården to Nacka. The station will be located around 40 meters beneath Värmdövägen and Birkavägen in Järla, Nacka.

== Location and entrances ==
Järla station will feature two main entrances. The primary entrance will be located at a new square on Värmdövägen, and a second entrance will connect to Birkavägen. The station will be located near the Saltsjöbanan's Saltsjö-Järla station, though without a direct connection between the two stations. Construction of the station is coinciding with the development of around 600 new residential units in the area.

== Design and construction ==
The station will feature a dark grey granite facade with cream-colored ceramic tiles surrounding the entrance doors. The interior design, including platform and ticket hall, will incorporate patterns by artist Cilla Ramnek, inspired by traditional textiles. The station is expected to accommodate approximately 1,000 passengers per hour during peak hours once operational in 2030.

Construction of the station began in 2020 as part of the larger extension of the Blue Line. Tunnel blasting in the area was completed by February 2024, when the tunnels between Järla and Nacka met. Further tunnel work between Järla and Sickla was finished later that year. Future construction phases will include the installation of platforms, escalators, and other station facilities, with the line expected to be operational by 2030.
