= Nacka metro station =

Nacka
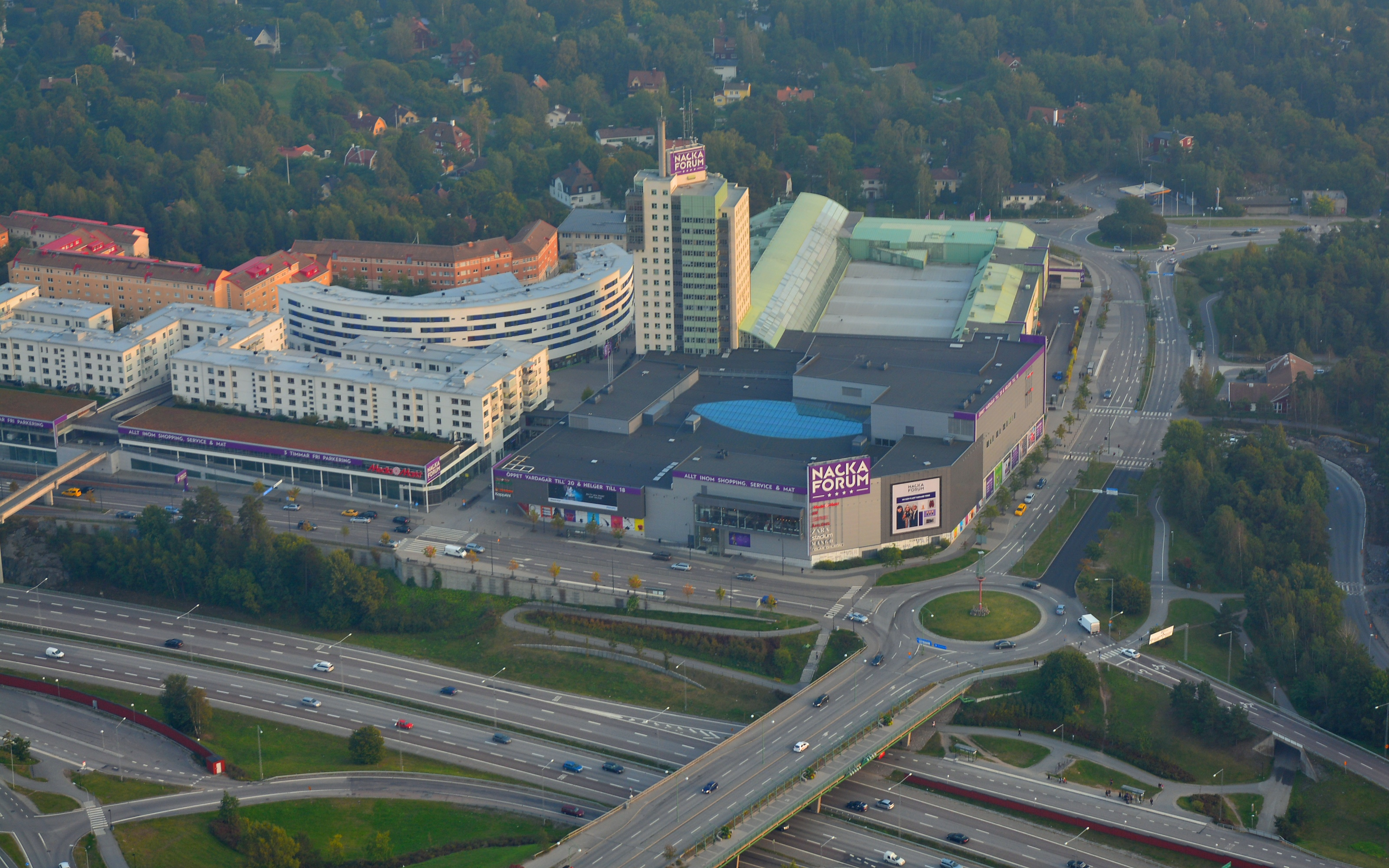
- Road 222 and Nacka Forum, where station's main entrances will be

General information
- Location: Nacka, Stockholm
- System: Future Stockholm Metro station
- Line: Blue Line
- Platforms: 1 island platform
- Tracks: 2
- Connections: Bus services at Nacka Forum

Construction
- Structure type: Underground
- Depth: 40 m (130 ft)

History
- Opening: 2030

Services
Preceding station: Järla
Proceeding station: (Terminus)

Nacka is a future station on the Stockholm Metro's Blue Line. Scheduled to open in 2030, the station is part of the Blue Line extension from Kungsträdgården to Nacka. The station will be located around 40 meters beneath Road 222, close to Nacka Forum shopping centre. It is unrelated to the similarly named Nacka station on the Saltsjöbanan, which is located around 2km to the east.

== Location and entrances ==
Nacka station will feature three main entrances. The primary entrance will be near Vikdalsbron, with another entrance across Vikdalsvägen near the planned Nacka city park. An additional entrance will be constructed at Jarlabergsvägen. The station will have transfer options to bus services connecting to other parts of Nacka and Stockholm. Many of the Nacka busses currently terminating at Slussen will be moved to a new bus terminal at Nacka metro station. Once the station is complete, the travel time from Nacka to Kungsträdgården in 10 minutes, and to T-Centralen in 12 minutes.

== Construction ==
Construction began in 2020 as part of the larger extension of the Blue Line. By February 2024, tunnel blasting was completed when the tunnels from Nacka and Järla stations met. Further tunnel work between Järla and Sickla stations was completed later that year. Future work will include the installation of platforms, escalators, and other station facilities, with the line expected to be operational by 2030.
