= 2013 Saltsjöbanan train crash =

Railway incident in Sweden

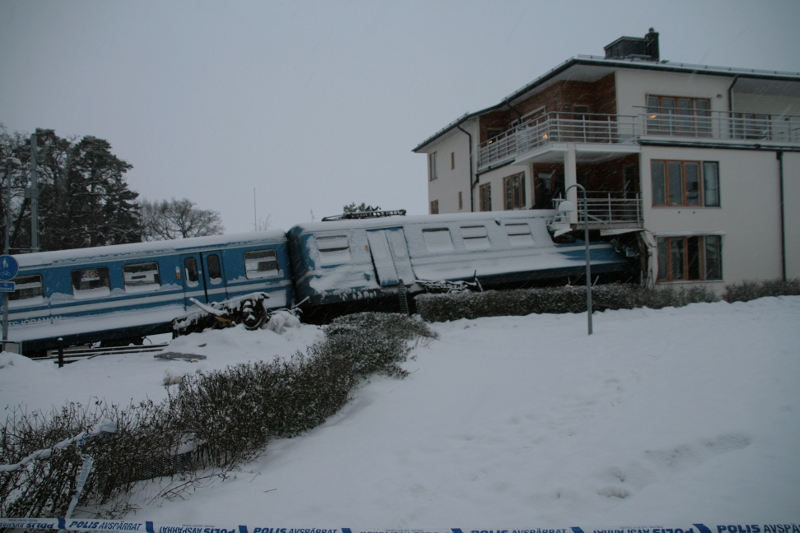

Details
- Date: 15 January 2013
- Location: Saltsjöbaden
- Coordinates: 59°16′44″N 18°18′50″E
- Country: Sweden
- Line: Saltsjöbanan
- Operator: Arriva
- Incident type: Train runaway
- Cause: Human error

Statistics
- Trains: 1
- Passengers: 1 (a cleaner)
- Deaths: 0
- Injured: 1
- Damage: One carriage written off.

The 2013 Saltsjöbanan train crash occurred in the early morning hours of 15 January 2013. A passenger train started to move without authorization, with only a cleaner on board. It overran a set of buffer stops and crashed into a block of flats in Saltsjöbaden, Sweden. The cleaner was at first suspected of having "stolen" the train, but was later cleared of blame, as the train was found to have started moving because of violation of safety procedures.

== Incident ==
On 15 January 2013, a Saltsjöbanan commuter train crashed into a residential building in the Stockholm suburb of Saltsjöbaden, seriously injuring a cleaner who was in the train at the time. Travelling through two stations at 80 km/h (50 mph), the train derailed, running into the ground-floor kitchen of a house. The woman's condition was described as "serious but stable" in hospital. None of the five people who were inside the house at the time of the crash was hurt.

Bertil Grandinson, a resident on the top floor of the house, explained: "We woke up at half past two by a terrible bang. It was as if an aeroplane crashed. I looked out the window and noted then to my great surprise that the train had run into the house. It is terrible and very shocking".

Police spokesman Ulf Lindgren said: "It's incredibly lucky that no one in the house was injured. The head of the emergency services crew has ordered the house to be evacuated for safety reasons".

== Investigation and aftermath ==
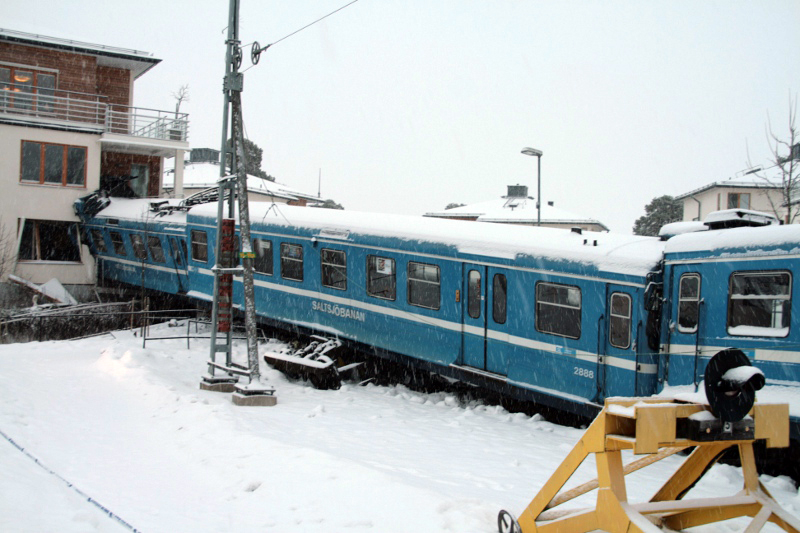
View from the other side of tracks.

Initially media reports suggested the train had been stolen by a 20-year-old cleaner; however, the train owner Storstockholms Lokaltrafik and operator Arriva spokespeople later apologised for this explanation and suggested that it was only ever an initial hypothesis, which they should not have shared with the media in such a way. As of 20 January 2013, the cleaner's union, SEKO, was reportedly considering legal action for defamation on her behalf.

Two weeks after the accident the cleaner claimed not to remember anything about the incident. The cleaner was cleared of all suspicion by the prosecutor's office on 18 January 2013. The prosecutor alleged that a number of "unfortunate circumstances" and "a number of serious safety breaches on the train and where it was parked" had led to the crash. The investigation was reported to be considering whether or not any laws had been broken in the accident.

The remaining train car was removed from the house on 28 January, nearly two weeks after the crash occurred. The stretch of the railway between Neglinge and Saltsjöbaden was closed for maintenance work until mid-September 2013.

On 5 May 2014 the Swedish Accident Investigation Authority published its final report absolving the injured woman of all responsibility. The report states that a switchman had secured the "dead man's switch" in its depressed position with a foreign object, leaving the train stationary with brakes released and the power control lever in full forward power. Only the open doors caused the power to be cut off. After finishing her work, the cleaner entered the motorman's cabin as instructed to close the passenger-doors and exit through the cab door. When she closed the doors, the power to the traction switched in and the train took off. Lacking training, the cleaner could find no way to stop the train. Failure to set points to prevent the train entering the main line made the accident more serious than it would otherwise have been.

Arriva was eventually fined SEK 500,000 for workplace safety violations, and ordered to pay the cleaner SEK 20,000 in compensation.
