= Slussen metro station =

Stockholm Metro and local rail station

Slussen
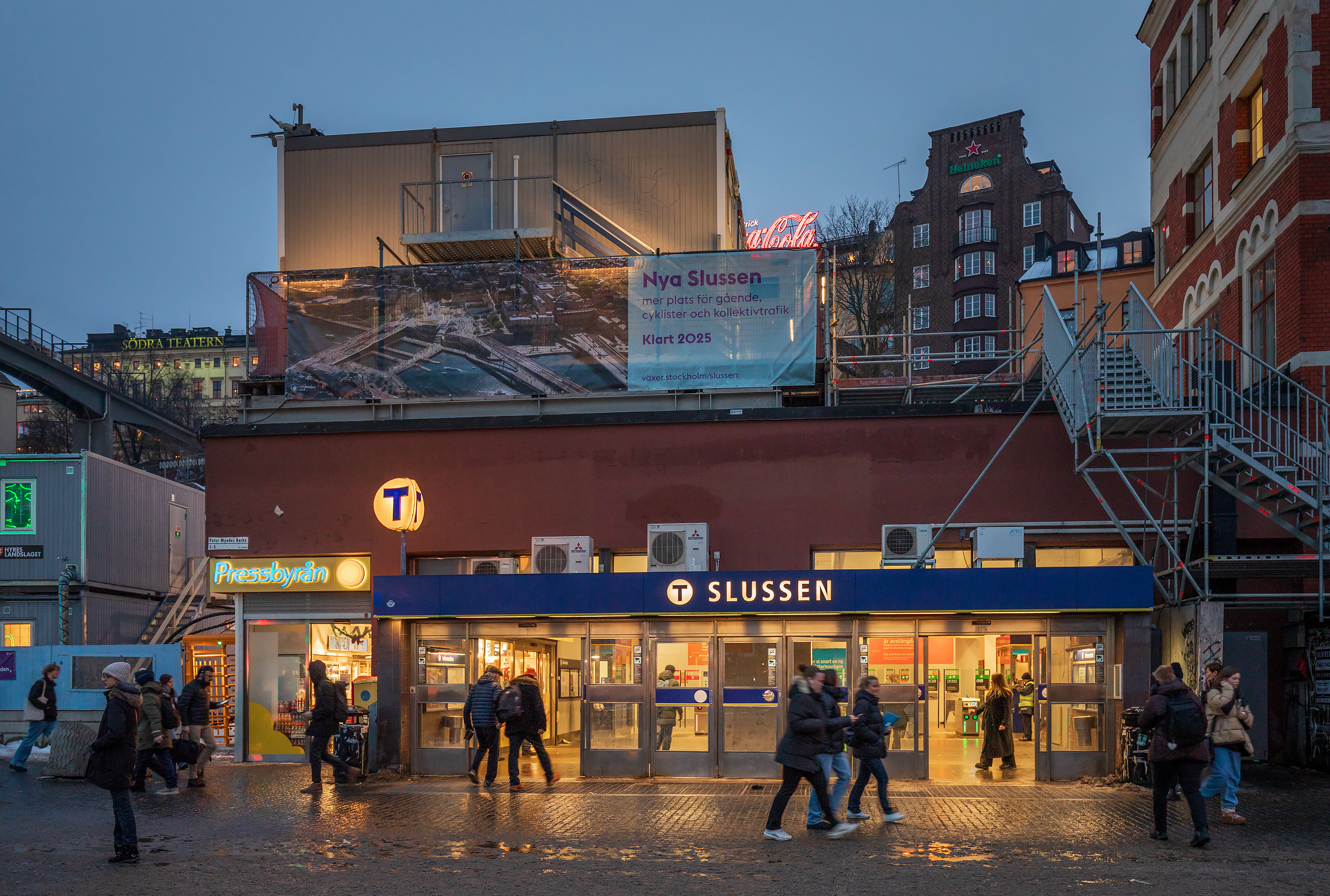
- Station entrance at Ryssgården

General information
- Location: Södermalm, Stockholm
- Coordinates: 59°19′9″N 18°4′19″E
- Elevation: 8 m (26 ft) above sea level
- System: Stockholm Metro station
- Owner: Storstockholms Lokaltrafik
- Platforms: 2
- Tracks: 4

Construction
- Structure type: Underground
- Depth: 7–24 m (23–79 ft)
- Accessible: Yes

Other information
- Station code: SLU

History
- Opened: 1 October 1933; 93 years ago
- Rebuilt: 1957

Passengers
- 2019: 79,000 boarding per weekday (metro total)
- 2019: 39,450 (Green Line)
- 2019: 39,550 (Red Line)

Services
Preceding station	Stockholm Metro	Following station
Mariatorget towards Norsborg	Line 13	Gamla stan towards Ropsten
Mariatorget towards Fruängen	Line 14	Gamla stan towards Mörby centrum
Gamla stan towards Åkeshov	Line 17	Medborgarplatsen towards Skarpnäck
Gamla stan towards Alvik	Line 18	Medborgarplatsen towards Farsta strand
Gamla stan towards Hässelby strand	Line 19	Medborgarplatsen towards Hagsätra

Other Services
Preceding station	SL Local & Light Rail	Following station
Terminus	Saltsjöbanan Line 25	Henriksdal towards Saltsjöbaden
Location
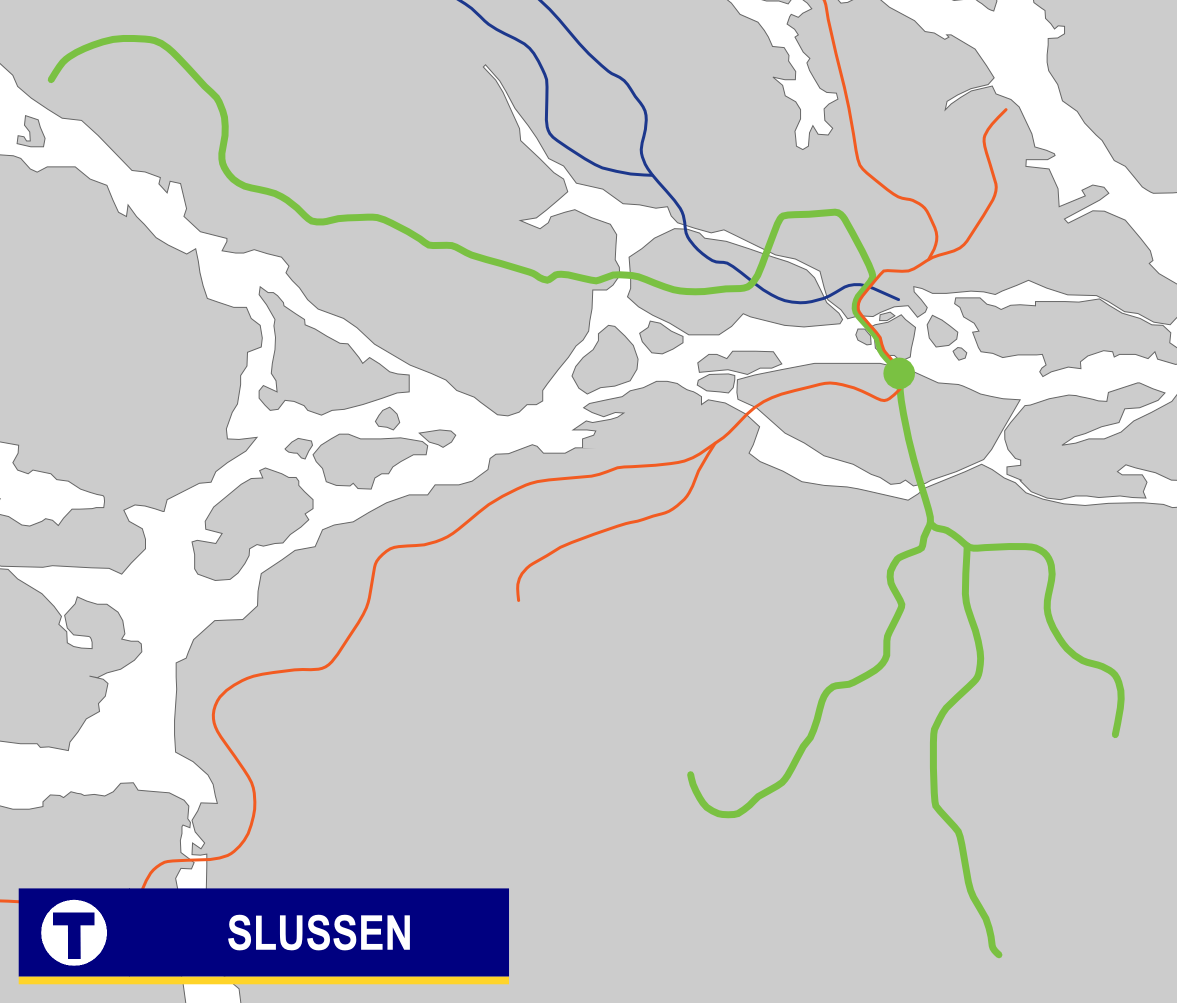
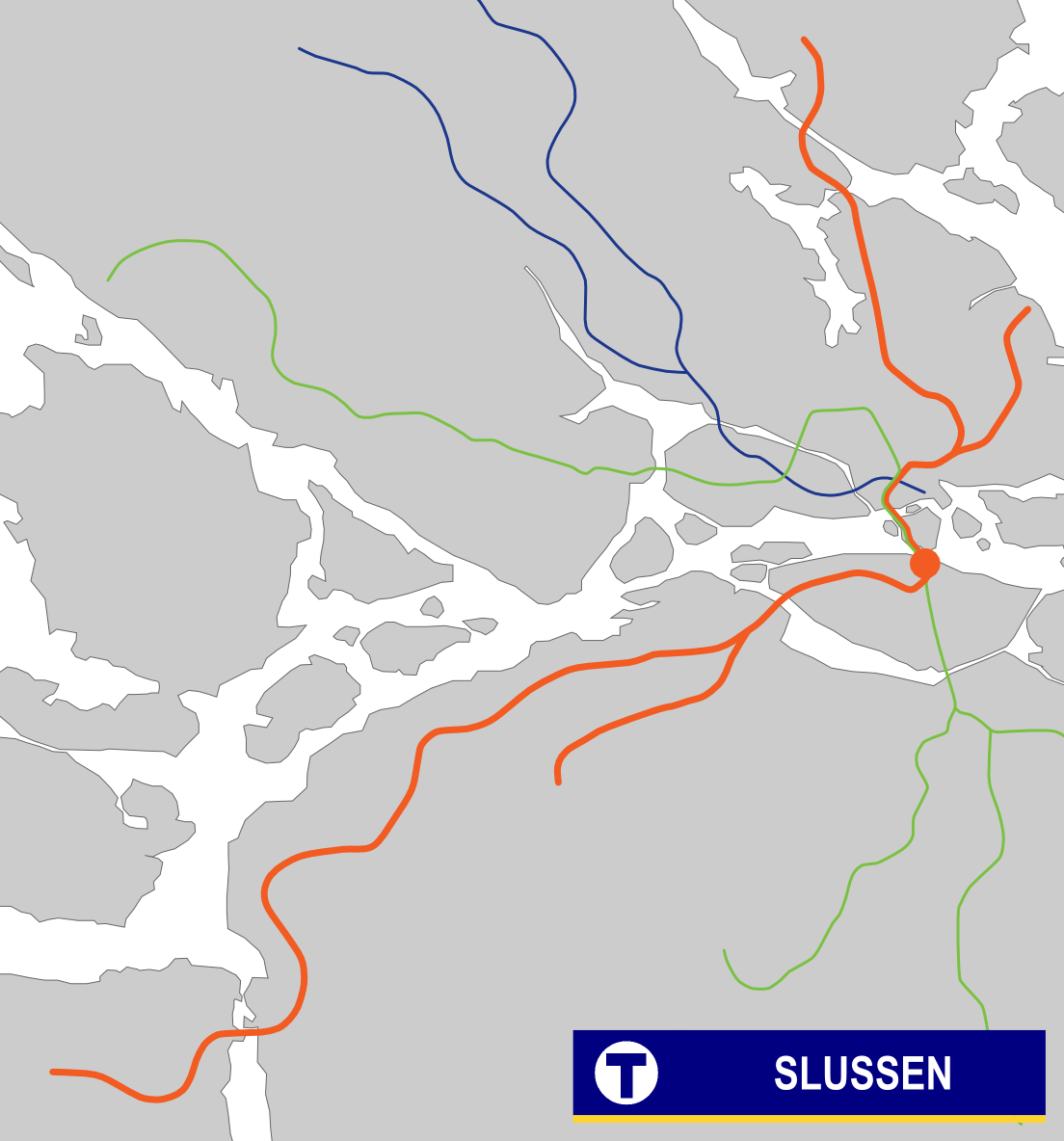
- Green Line highlighted Red Line highlighted

Slussen is a station on the Stockholm Metro and Saltsjöbanan, located at Slussen in the district of Södermalm. It is served by the Red and Green lines, and originally opened in 1933 as an underground tram stop. On 1 October 1950, it became the terminus of Stockholm's first metro line, which ran south to Hökarängen. The station was rebuilt when the line was connected north to Hötorget in 1957. In 1964, Slussen became part of the Red Line when its first section, between T-Centralen and Fruängen, opened.

Slussen has also been the terminus of the Saltsjöbanan since the 1940s. However, services have been diverted to Henriksdal since 2016 due to the reconstruction of Slussen, with the terminus expected to reopen in 2028.

Slussen bus terminal, serving routes mainly to the Nacka and Värmdö municipalities, is adjacent to the station.

== History ==
By 1930, the dense tram traffic on the streets of Södermalm to the south of Slussen was seen as problematic. 0n 30 March 1931, the Stockholm City Council decided to build the Södertunneln, a tunnel linking Slussen to Skanstull. Whilst initially built to carry tram services, the tunnel was built to pre-metro standards, allowing for eventual conversion to metro service.

The tunnel opened on 30 September 1933, and the project included the original Slussen station. This was built in the open air at the northern end of the tunnel, and included low-height platforms and a turning loop for the trams. In 1936, the Saltsjöbanan local railway was extended some 300 m (980 ft) from its previous terminus at Stadsgården station to a new terminus below and to the east of the tram station.

In 1949, work started on converting the Södertunneln to full metro standard, and the conversion of the erstwhile tram station into a metro station, albeit one still above ground. On 1 October 1950, the metro service with the new metro trains was inaugurated. With this, Slussen became the terminal of the Stockholm's first metro line, which ran south to Hökarängen and now forms part of the Green line.

In 1952, a second, detached section of line opened in the north of the city from Hötorget to Vällingby. On 24 November 1957, the two sections were connected and Slussen became a through station. Much of the connecting route was built with four tracks, although only two were used by the Green line, and it approached Slussen by a bridge over the Söderström from Gamla stan.

Between 1962 and 1964, the metro station was rebuilt and covered over, with the Ryssgården square created above it. With this, the station took on its current appearance. On 5 April 1964, the first stretch of the Red line, between T-Centralen and Fruängen, was opened, using the extra pair of tracks between T-Centralen and Slussen and serving the rebuilt station.

Until 1971, the Saltsjöbanan railway station had an associated goods yard, but in that year this was removed and a new bus station built on its site, to serve as a terminus of services to the Nacka and Värmdö municipalities. The bus station underwent a major renovation between 1985 and 1987.

In 2016, the Saltsjöbanan terminus was tenporarily moved to Henriksdal in order to facilitate the reconstruction of Slussen, with a rail replacement bus service bridging the gap. For the same reason, the bus station was relocated to a temporary location at Stadsgårdsleden in 2018. A further relocation, to Stadsgårdsterminalen, followed in 2024. It is expected both the Saltsjöbanan and bus stations will reopen when the reconstruction is complete in 2028.

== Operation ==
=== Metro station ===
The station is oriented on a north-south axis, and has four tracks and two island platforms. In order from west to east, the tracks are used by:

- Northbound Green line trains towards Hässelby strand
- Northbound Red line trains towards Ropsten and Mörby centrum
- Southbound Red line trains towards Norsborg and Fruängen
- Southbound Green line trains towards Skarpnäck, Farsta strand and Hagsätra

One island platform serves all northbound trains, whilst the other serves all southbound trains.

At the northern end of the station, the tracks are above ground level, albeit enclosed by the surrounding development. However the ground level rises steeply to the south, and at the southern the tracks are well below ground level. There are three ticket halls and barrier lines, the northern two of which are directly accessible from Ryssgården and the surrounding streets, and which provide access by stairs and lifts to the platforms at their north and middle respectively.

The third ticket hall is to the south of the station, where the ground level is much higher, and is at a mid-level between ground and platform level. It is accessed from an entrance on Götgatan, with escalator access from both street level and to platform level. This entrance has no lifts.

North of Slussen, the four tracks cross the Söderström on the Söderströmsbron. Crossovers between the tracks provide connections between the Red and Green lines. South of the station, the tracks enter tunnels, where a grade-separated junction separates the two lines. Owing to the proximity of this junction to the station, the southern ends of the platforms are divided between two levels, with steps connecting the two sections.

=== Saltsjöbanan station ===
The Saltsjöbanan station has been closed since 2016, in order to facilitate the reconstruction of Slussen, with a rail replacement bus service bridging the gap to an interim terminus at Henriksdal. It is expected the terminus will reopen when the reconstruction is complete in 2028.

The old Saltsjöbanan station was situated to the east of, and at a lower level than the metro tracks. It had a single track, which ran at roughly right-angles to the metro tracks, serving a single platform. The replacement station will be built on the same alignment, but some 70 m (230 ft) further east, and will have two tracks and a 110 m (360 ft) long platform. Like its predecessor, it will be connected to the metro station by a walkway.

=== Bus station ===
The original bus terminus at Slussen closed in 2018, and moved to a temporary bus terminal at Stadsgårdsleden, slightly to the east. In the summer of 2024, the temporary bus terminal moved further east to a new location at Stadsgårdsterminalen.

A new bus terminal is under construction within a rock cavern under Katarinaberget. It will have an arrival area with space for 6 buses, 17 departure bays and a separate waiting hall. Buses will enter and exit the terminal from Stadsgårdsleden with the Saltsjöbanan railway passing over the entrance on a bridge. Enclosed pedestrian routes will be provided from both the metro and Saltsjöbanan stations, and there will be pedestrian entrances from Katarinavägen and Stadsgårdskajen.

== Art ==
Slussen metro station has a number of permanent art works on display, including:

- Dividing gates between the platforms, executed in iron and concrete by Aston Forsberg in 1964.
- Enamelled sheet metal wall designs in the passage to Götgatan, executed by Sune Fogde in 1965.
- Deep relief in white marble concrete in the ticket hall at Götgatan, entitled Admission 70 öre and executed by Aston Forsberg and Birger Forsberg in 1965.
- Glass painting in the ticket hall at Slussen, entitled Off the tracks and executed by Harald Lyth in 1983.
- Latticed blue screens with triangular patterns in the track area, executed by Bernt Rafael Sundberg in 1990.

The metro station is also part of the metro's Konstväxlingar (art exchanges) program, displaying rotating temporary art exhibitions. An exhibition by Liv Strömquist entitled The Night Garden was shown here in November 2017, sparking a debate about the appropriateness of showing depictions of menstruation to children.

There is also a 90-metre long noise divider at the bus terminal, executed in neon and black granite by Gun Gordillo in 1987.

== Gallery ==
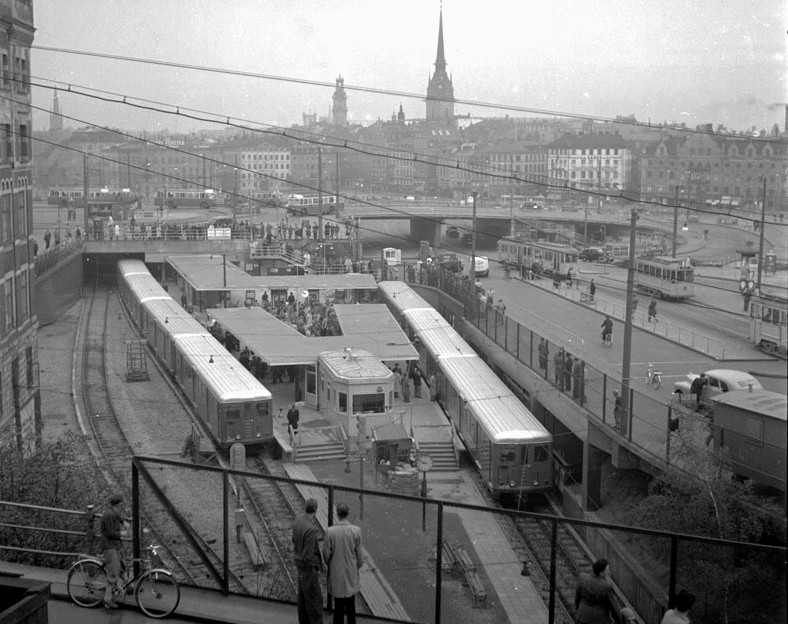
Slussen metro station in 1950, before it was covered by the Ryssgården square

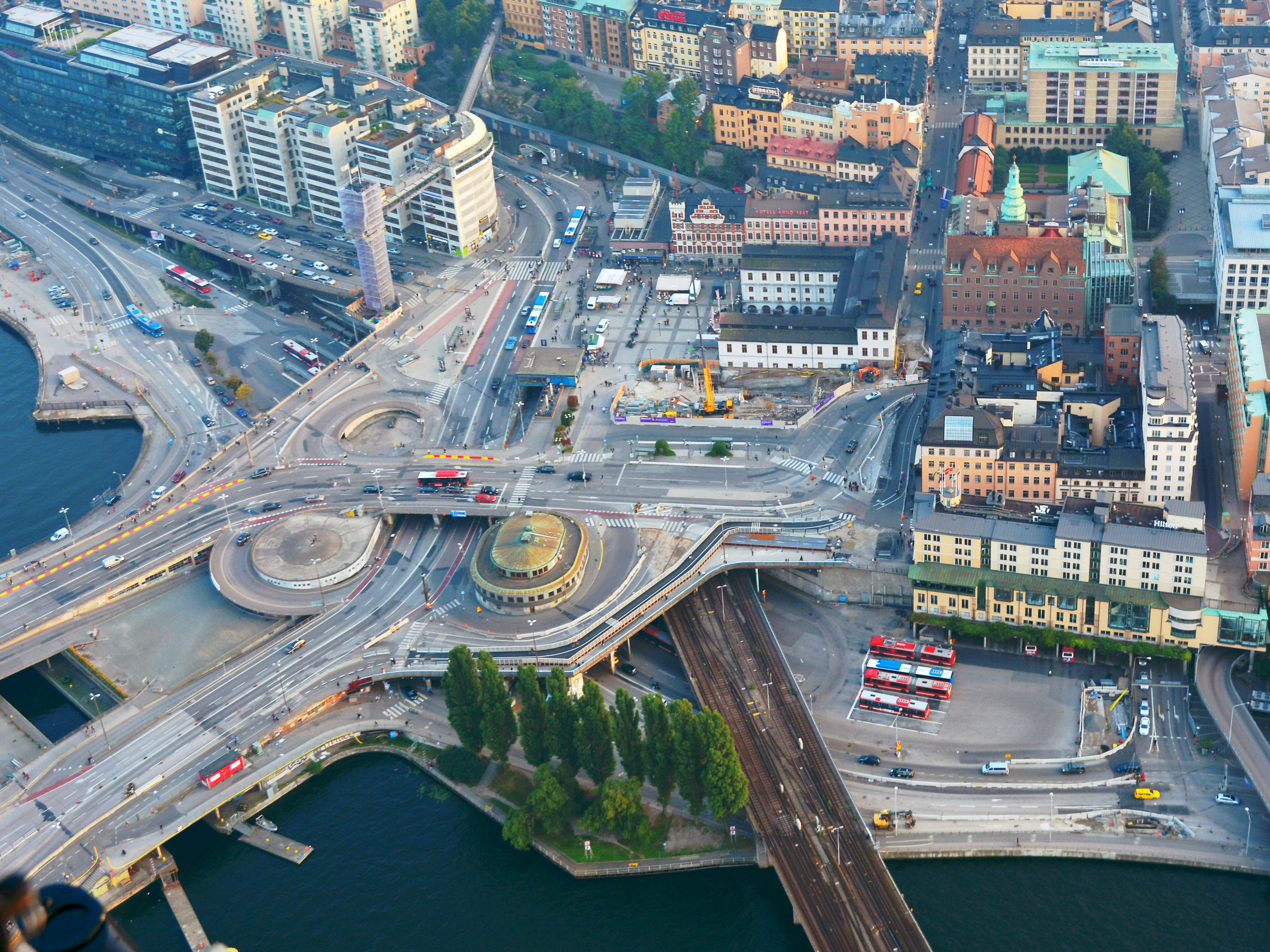
Slussen station in 2014, with Ryssgården centred and Saltsjöbanan top left

Ryssgården square above the station, with station entrance in distance

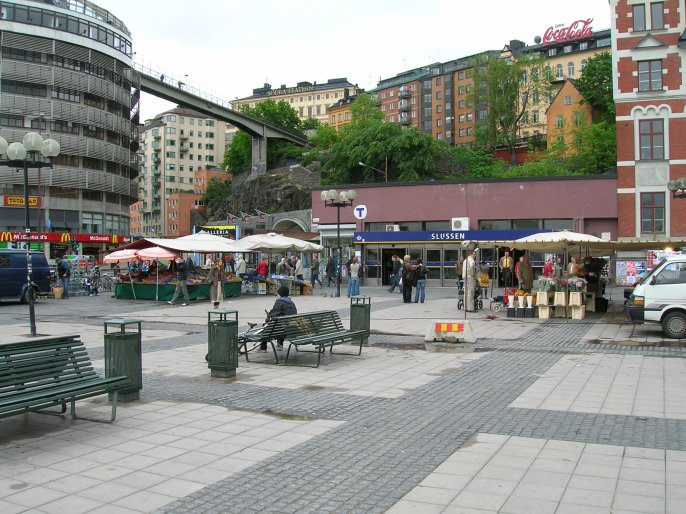
The middle of the three station entrances, on Ryssgården

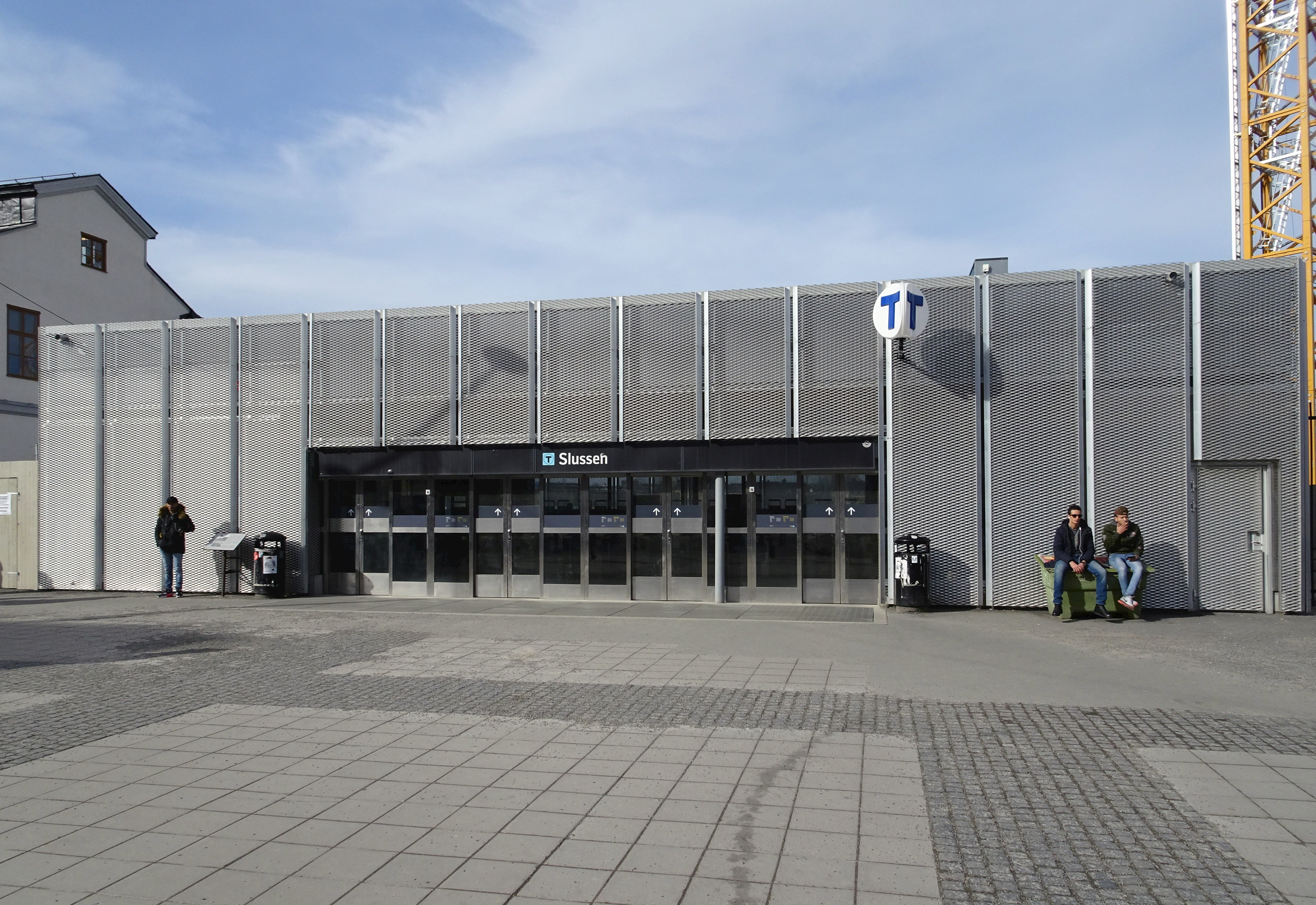
Temporary building for the northern station entrance, also on Ryssgården

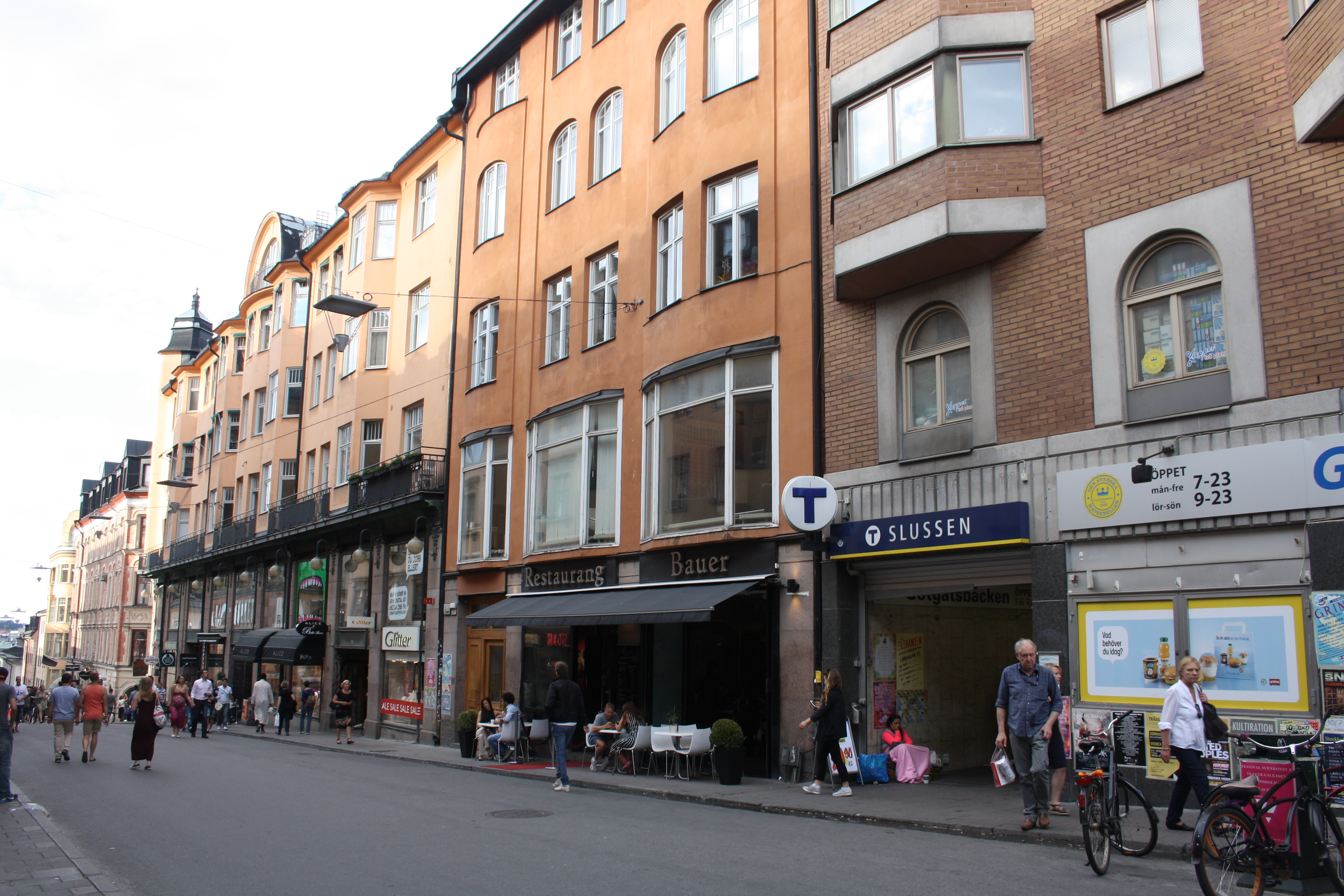
The southern station entrance, on Götgatan

Ticket hall and barriers, in the temporary northen entrance

One of the metro station's two platforms

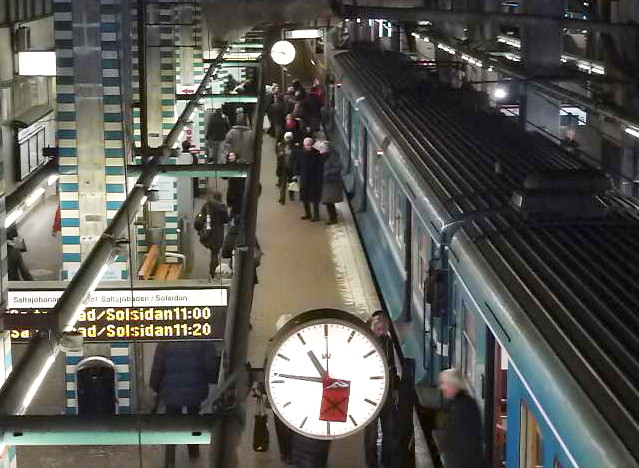
Saltsjöbanan platform in 2014, before its demolition

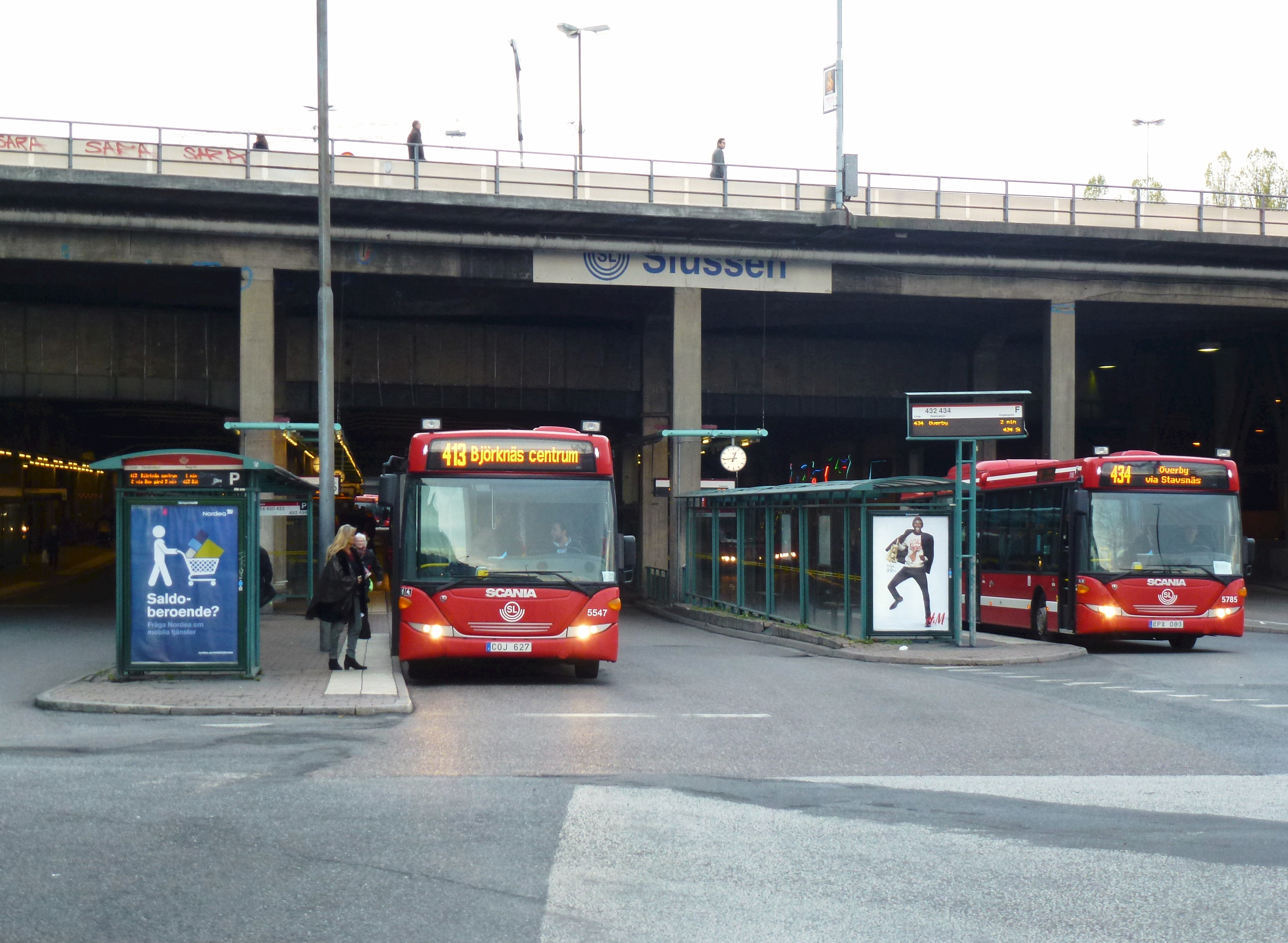
The bus terminal in 2014, before its demolition

The temporary bus station at Stadsgårdsterminalen

Wall decoration by Sune Fogde at the Götgatan exit

Latticed blue screens by Bernt Rafael Sundberg
