= Saltsjöbanan =

Electrified suburban rail system in Stockholm, Sweden

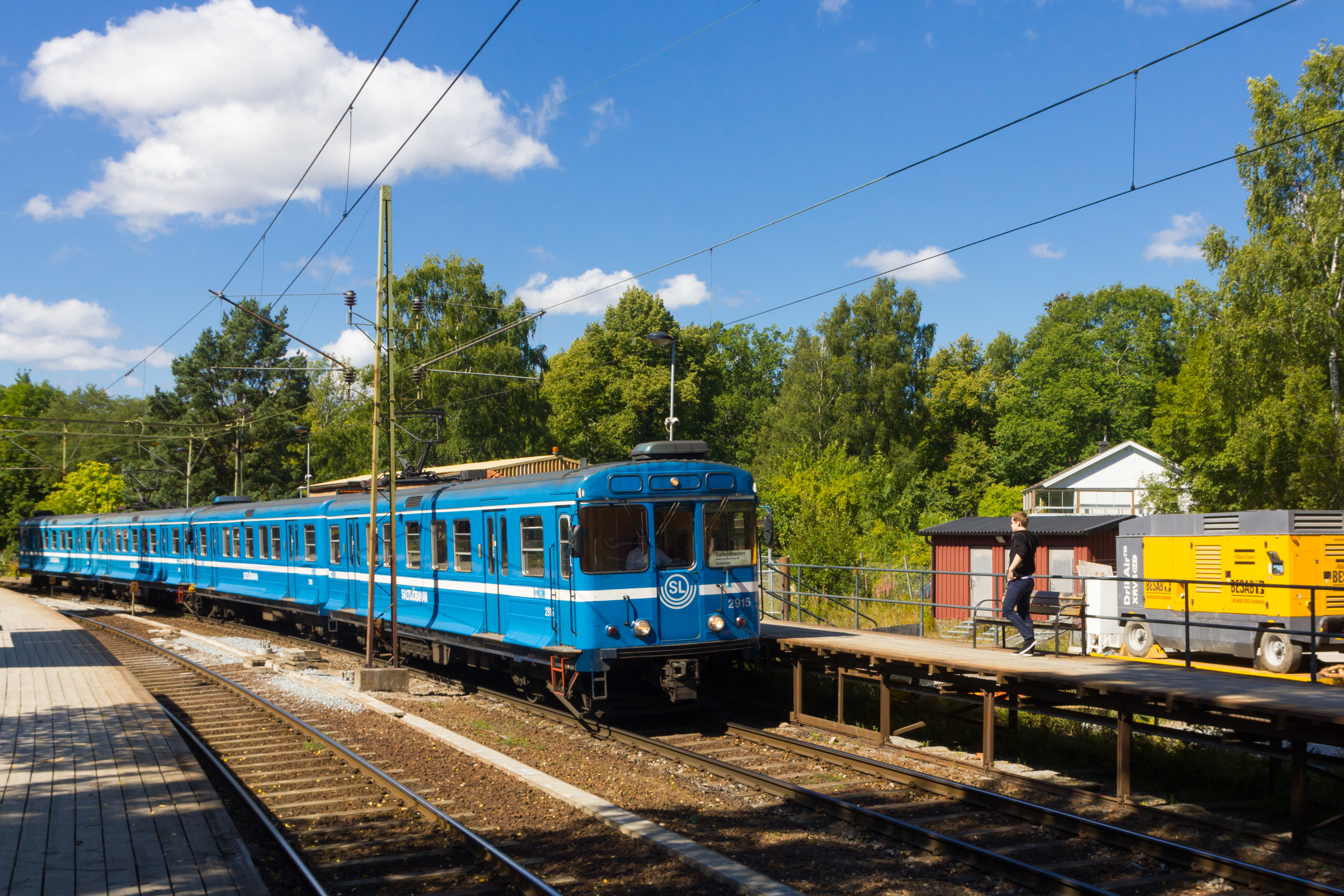

Overview
- Owner: Storstockholms Lokaltrafik
- Locale: Stockholm County, Sweden
- Termini: Henriksdal; Saltsjöbaden/Solsidan
- Stations: 18

Service
- Type: Commuter rail (classified as light rail)
- Operator: Stockholms Spårvägar
- Depot: Neglinge
- Daily ridership: 17,200 boardings (2019)

History
- Opened: 1 July 1893

Technical
- Line length: 18.6 km (11.6 mi)
- Num of tracks: 1
- Track gauge: 1,435 mm (4 ft 8 1/2 in) standard gauge
- Electrification: Overhead catenary; 1,500 V DC (1913–1976); 750 V DC (1976–)
- Operating speed: 70 km/h (43 mph)

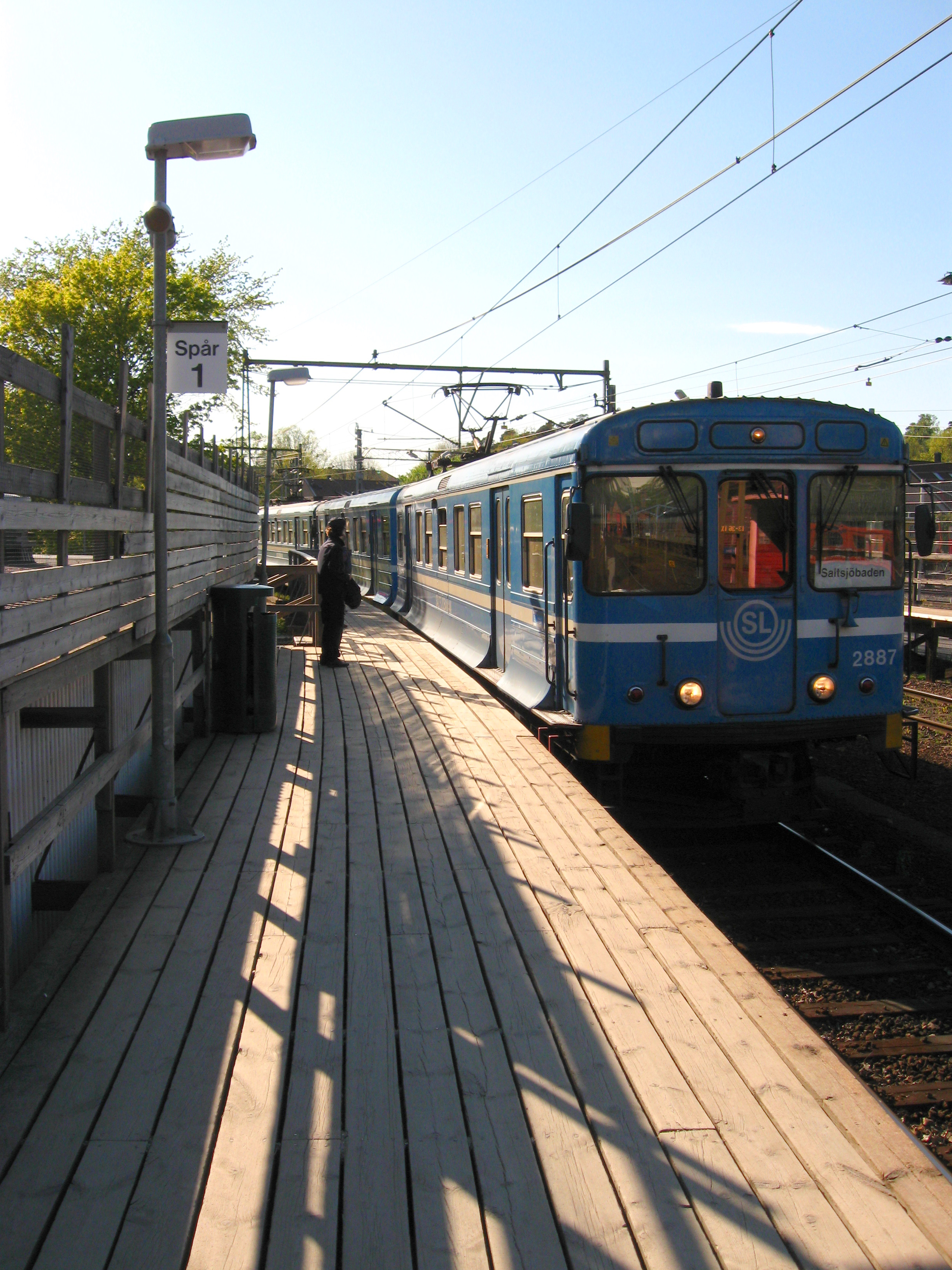
Train arriving at Neglinge, where the traffic control center and service depot are located

Saltsjöbanan (lit. 'the Salt Sea Line') is an electrified suburban rail system in Stockholm, Sweden, which runs from Slussen to Saltsjöbaden in Nacka.

Originally known as Stockholm-Saltsjöns Järnäg it is 18.5 kilometres (11.5 mi) in length and has eighteen stations in use. The system is operated by Storstockholms Lokaltrafik (SL) on lines 25 and 26.

An average of 17,200 boardings are made on an ordinary workday (2019). The line is mostly single-track (with passing loops between Nacka and Saltsjö-Järla, and between Storängen and Saltsjö-Duvnäs), and is isolated from Sweden's national railway network, although both are built to compatible 1,435 mm (4 ft 8 1/2 in) standard gauge. SL describes it as "light rail" or "local rail" (Swedish: lokalbana) on its maps.

From January 2023 until December 2024, the entire Saltsjöbanan was closed for reconstruction and replaced with buses, after the westernmost section from Henriksdal to Slussen had already been suspended since 2016 because of the Projekt Slussen project at the Slussen area. Services on the section are expected to be reopened in 2028.

Services partially resumed on 15 December 2024 between Saltsjö-Järla and Saltsjöbaden as well as between Igelboda and Solsidan, with full service beyond Saltsjö-Jarla to Slussen planned for 2028.

== History ==
K.A. Wallenberg largely initiated and financed the project. The railway's initial purpose was to offer a quick way for stressed-out Stockholm residents to get to planned beaches and recreational facilities around Saltsjöbaden. The construction of the railway went faster than expected, but turned out to be very expensive, mostly owing to the problems building the last stretch into the city, which involved a lot of tedious work with explosives to even out the ground and to build two long tunnels, one of which was the country's longest at the time of the construction. This sudden increase in costs led the tunnels to be nicknamed "Wallenberg's downfall" (Swedish: "Wallenbergs undergång") for a while afterwards.

Saltsjöbanan was inaugurated on 1 July 1893 and was operated with steam locomotives until 1910 after which the lines were gradually electrified (circa 1 kV DC). The construction of the branch that runs from Igelboda to Solsidan (also called Vårgärdsbanan) was fully contracted to a Danish company, Brøchner-Larsen & Krogh. The branch opened in 1913.

Initially the railway was operated by Järnvägs AB Stockholm-Saltsjön, and carried a great deal of profitable freight traffic. This diminished with time, and by the 1960s it was no longer breaking even, and a complete closure was considered. However, the Stockholm County Council took over the line in 1969, and today it is owned by Storstockholms Lokaltrafik (SL).

To this day, the route remains mostly unchanged since the early 1900s, but has seen slight alterations at its outer ends. In the 1940s, the western end was extended by about 400 metres (440 yards), moving its Stockholm terminus from Stadsgården to the more centrally located Slussen interchange. Conversely, the easternmost end, which once ran all the way to the Saltsjöbaden shore, for convenient transfer to archipelago ferries, now stops about 200 metres (220 yards) inland. A railway branch also used to go from slightly west of Östervik to a gravel pit in Snörom, a distance of about 3 km (1.9 mi). It was however only used for industrial purposes. The branch was decommissioned as early as 1902 and all that remains today is a minor road with the same stretch. A Culemeyer trailer is stored a railway siding linked to the passing track near Storängen Station.

Until 2000, Saltsjöbanan also used to be connected to the Swedish national railway network via the Southern Main Line (link decommissioned 1954) as well as the Södra station–Hammarbyhamnen–Stadsgården freight branch line (sv:Industrispåret Södra station–Hammarbyhamnen–Stadsgården), which provided a connection to Stockholm Södra station.

=== 21st century ===
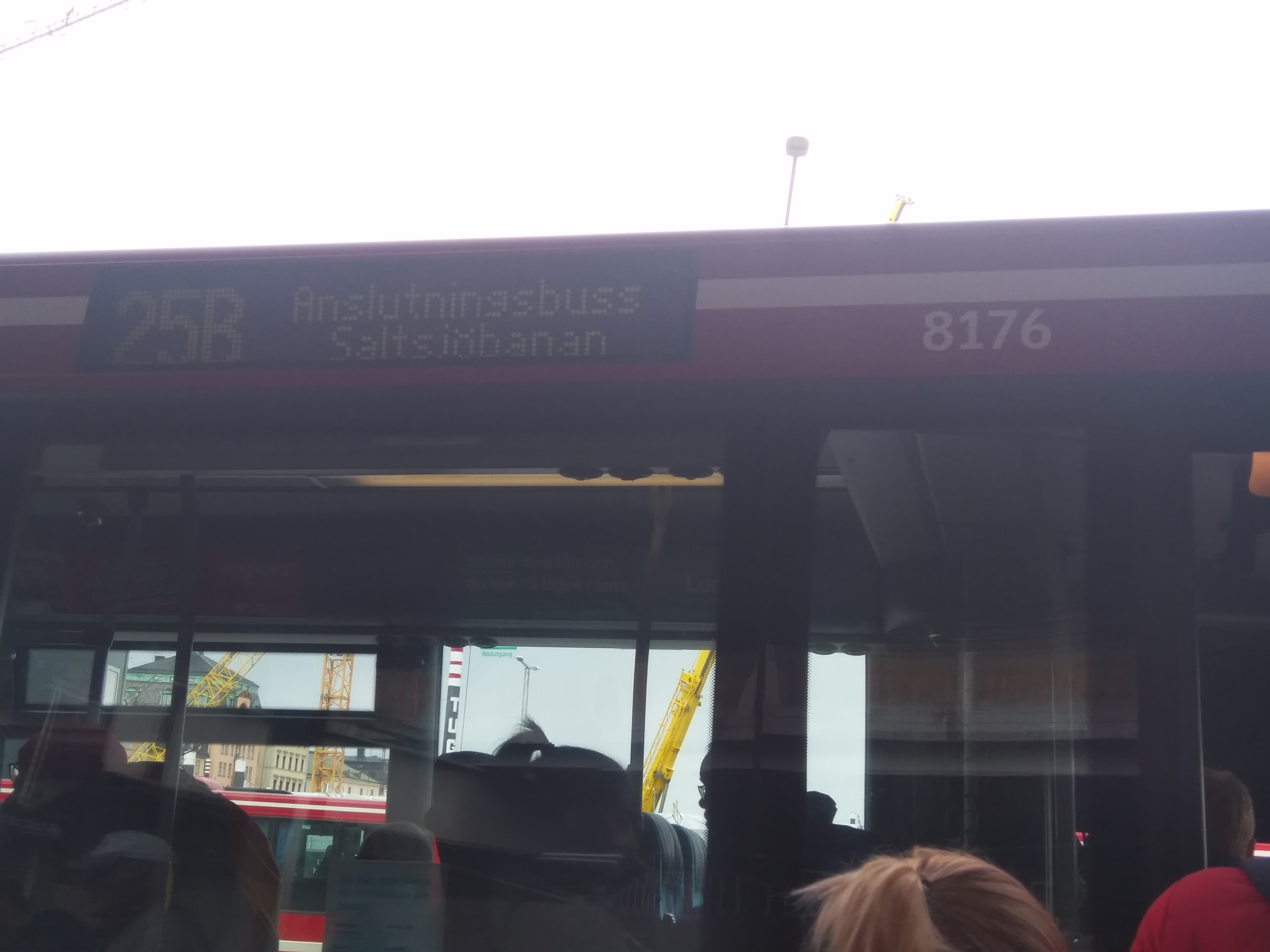
A bus running on line 25B to replace the shortened section of line 25 train

Due to the Slussen reconstruction project, the section between Henriksdal and Slussen was closed in 2016, making Henriksdal the temporary western terminus with a rail replacement bus running there. The line will be reopened when the reconstruction of Slussen is finished, planned for 2028.

From January 2023 until December 2024, the entire Saltsjöbanan was closed, with trains being replaced by buses. During the nearly two-year closure, passing loops were added at Fisksätra and Tattby stations, the Värmdövägen bridge near Sickla was rebuilt, and Sickla station was modified to provide a passenger interchange to Stockholm Metro's future Blue Line branch to Nacka. Train services will partially resume on 15 December 2024, with service operating between Saltsjö-Järla and Saltsjöbaden, and on the branch between Igelboda and Solsidan.

== Infrastructure ==
=== Rolling stock ===
==== Current ====
As of 2015, Saltsjöbanan operates two- and three-car electric multiple unit (EMU) trains, comprising C10 motor cars and C11 trailer cars. Built by ASEA between 1975 and 1976, these trains are modified versions of the C8 stock used on the Stockholm Metro and have a maximum speed of 70 km/h (43 mph).

For special events, two preserved wooden train carriages from 1912 to 1913, originally manufactured by ASEA, are available for private rentals. These historic carriages served as the primary rolling stock on Saltsjöbanan until the C10/C11 trains were introduced in 1976.

=== Future ===
On 11 November 2025, Region Stockholm signed an agreement with Škoda Transportation to build and deliver new trains for the Saltsjöbanan, designated X25. The order includes 16 vehicles, with an option for an additional 15. The new trains will replace the existing SL C10/C11 stock that has been in operation on the line for more than 50 years.

Each X25 vehicle will be approximately 36 m (118 ft 1 in) long and can operate singly or be coupled in sets of up to three, forming trains up to 108 metres in length. Capacity will be about 250 passengers per vehicle, of which 94 are seated. The trains will include air conditioning, digital passenger information screens, power outlets for charging electronic devices, onboard cameras, and flexible areas for wheelchairs, prams, and bicycles. The vehicles are designed to reduce interior and exterior noise compared with the current fleet.

Construction is scheduled to begin in 2026, with manufacturing starting in 2027. The first trains are planned for delivery to Stockholm for testing in 2029, with passenger service starting around the turn of 2029/2030.

The project was approved in December 2023, and includes 16 trains with an option for 15 more.

=== Tracks and signalling ===
Saltsjöbanan upgraded to automatic train control (ATC) in 2019 after three years of construction and training, enhancing safety by enabling automatic braking at red signals and other protective measures. This modernisation significantly reduces the risk of incidents like the 2013 Saltsjöbanan train crash. By 2022, ATC was fully operational, with all trains and operators certified for the system. To accommodate the new X25 trains and support increased service frequency, further upgrades to the power supply and track infrastructure are ongoing. This includes enhancements to Saltsjöbanan's electrical system, with a planned voltage increase to 1500 V DC by 2026, along with new high-voltage cables and a rectifier station at Neglinge Depot.

== Accidents and incidents ==
In the early morning hours of 15 January 2013, a passenger train started to move without authorisation, with only a cleaner on board. At maximum speed, it violently overran a set of buffer stops and crashed into a block of flats in Saltsjöbaden. The cleaner was first suspected of having stolen the train, but was later cleared of blame, as the train was then considered to have started moving due to some train malfunction and violation of safety procedures.

== Lines ==
Geographically accurate line map of Saltsjöbanan

The main line runs from Slussen to Saltsjöbaden, while a branch line connects the intermediate station Igelboda to Solsidan. There is a rail replacement bus line 25B connecting Slussen and Henriksdal while the reconstruction of Slussen is in progress.

The line is predominantly single track with passing loops at some stations. There are two longer sections of double track between Nacka – Saltsjö-Järla and Storängen – Saltsjö-Duvnäs totalling 2.5 kilometres (1.6 mi) which reduces delays waiting for trains in the opposite direction. The Solsidan branch is entirely single track.

Line	Route	Distance	Stops
25	Slussen – Saltsjöbaden	16 km	14
26	Igelboda – Solsidan	3 km	5
