= Farsta strand =

Swedish town

Coordinates: 59°14′06″N 18°06′06″E

See also Farsta strand metro station for the metro station.

Farsta strand is a suburban satellite town in the south part of Stockholm Municipality, Sweden.

== Communications ==
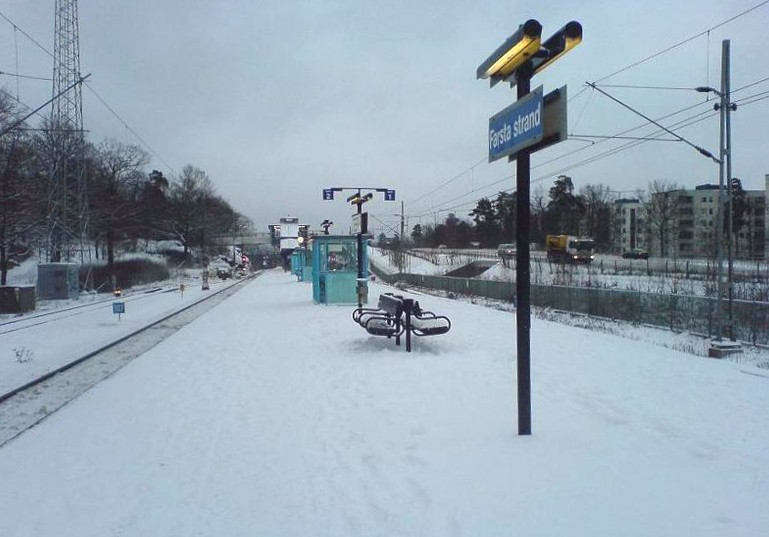
Farsta strand railway station

The railway station Farsta strand was opened in 1901 and was called Södertörns villastad until 1989. This station is used for commuter trains.

Since August 29, 1971, 200 m from the commuter train station, you can find the Farsta strand metro station, which is a terminus for Line 18 on the Green Line of the Stockholm Metro.
