= Stockholm Metro =

Rapid transit system in Stockholm, Sweden

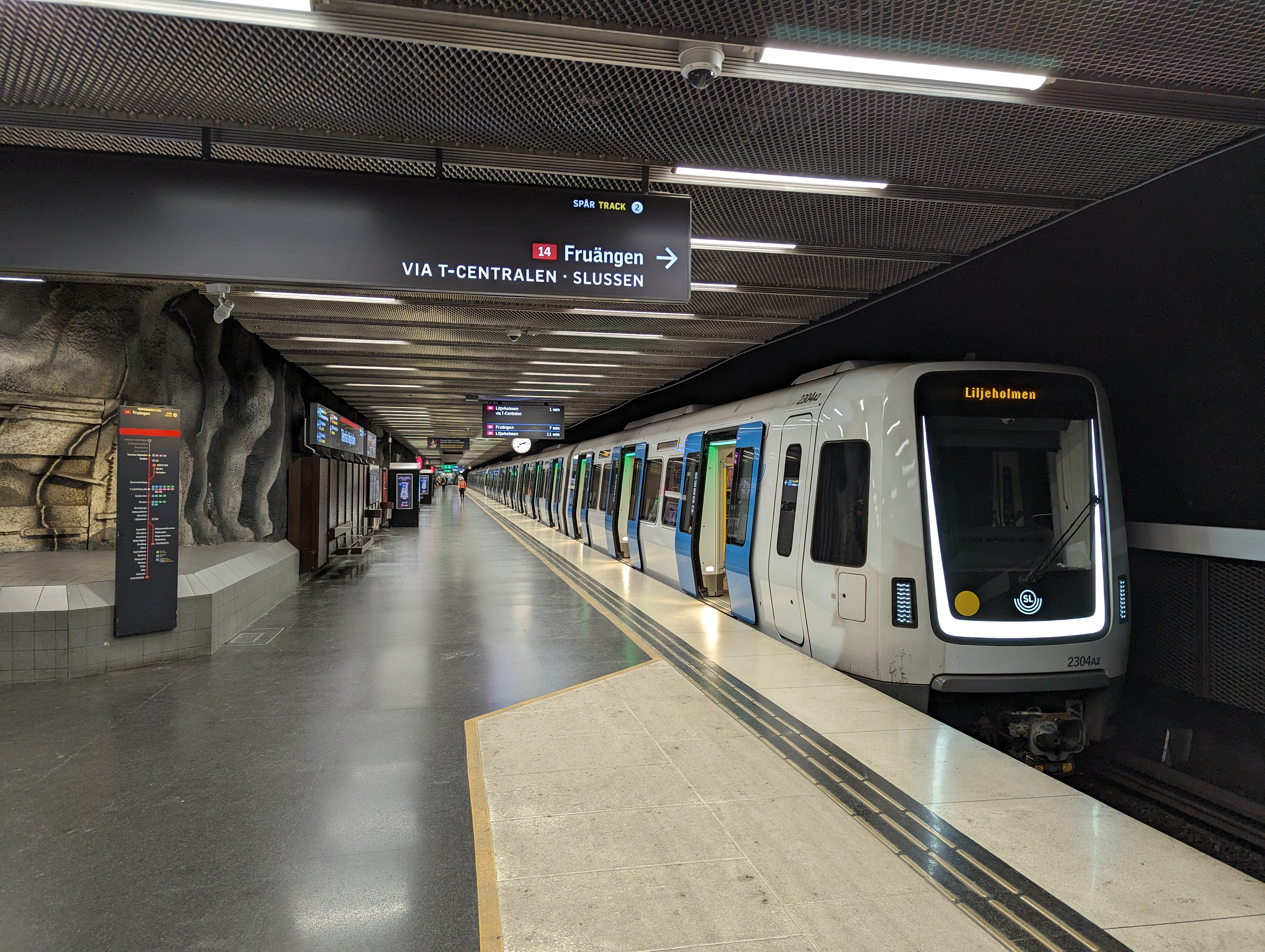
- A C30 train on the Red Line at Tekniska högskolan

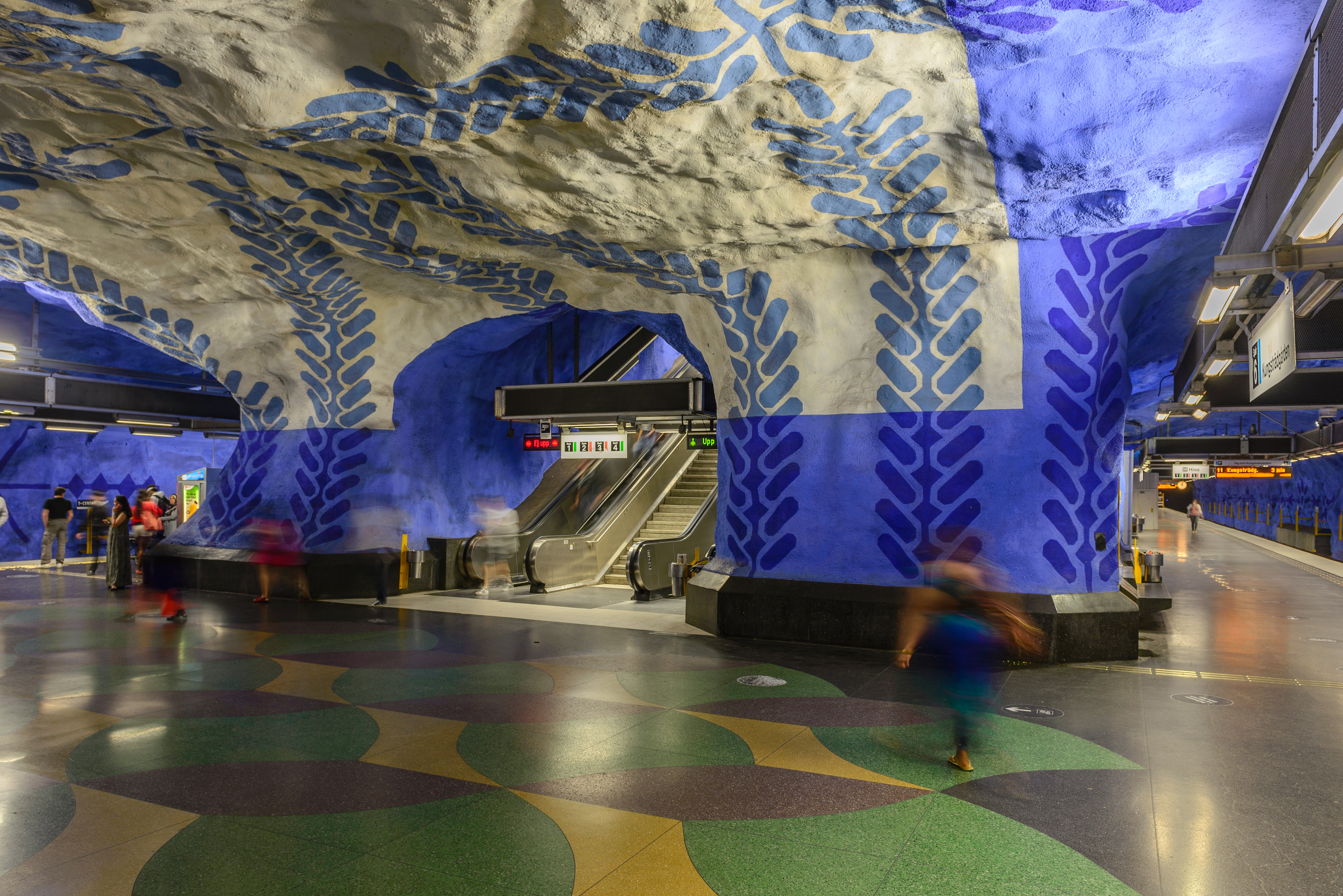
- Blue Line platforms at T-Centralen

Overview
- Native name: Stockholms tunnelbana
- Owner: Storstockholms Lokaltrafik (Region Stockholm)
- Locale: Stockholm, Sweden
- Transit type: Rapid transit
- Number of lines: 3 (7 routes)
- Line number: 10, 11 (Blue Line); 13, 14 (Red Line); 17, 18, 19 (Green Line)
- Number of stations: 100
- Daily ridership: 1 265 900 (2019)
- Annual ridership: 462 million (2019)
- Website: SL Official Site (in English)

Operation
- Began operation: September 30, 1933; 93 years ago (as premetro); October 1, 1950; 76 years ago (as metro)
- Operator: Connecting Stockholm
- Train length: 140 metres (459 ft 4 in)

Technical
- System length: 105.7 km (65.7 mi)
- Track gauge: 1,435 mm (4 ft 8 1/2 in) standard gauge
- Electrification: 650–750 V DC third rail (Note: 650 V for the Red and Green lines.)
- Top speed: 80 km/h (50 mph)

The Stockholm Metro (Swedish: Stockholms tunnelbana) is a rapid transit system in Stockholm, the capital city of Sweden. Its first line opened in 1950 as the first metro line in the Nordic countries, with a part of the network dating back to 1933 as an underground tramway. Today, the system consists of three lines and 100 stations, of which 47 are underground and 53 above ground. The system is owned by Region Stockholm via SL, the public transport authority for Stockholm County. It is the only metro system in Sweden.

The Metro's three coloured lines, Green, Red, and Blue, together form seven routes with different termini. All of these routes pass through the city centre, creating a highly centralised network. The main interchange for all three lines is T-Centralen station, where they intersect. In addition to T-Centralen, the system has three other interchange stations: Fridhemsplan, Slussen, and Gamla stan. Various extensions to the system are currently under construction, An extension to the north-west of the Blue Line is expected to open in 2027, while extensions to its south are expected to open in 2030. Construction of a new Yellow Line to the west of the city centre is scheduled to start in 2025.

In 2019, the Stockholm Metro transported 462 million passengers, equivalent to approximately 1.27 million on a typical weekday. The 105.7-kilometre-long (65.7 mi) metro system is operated by Connecting Stockholm. The system is equipped with ticket barriers. SL operates the Metro's ticketing system, with ticketing available via the SL app and rechargeable travel cards. Contactless payment is also accepted at the gates. Ticketing can also be purchased at station booths and select local retailers. SL phased out ticket machines on its network in 2022.

The Stockholm Metro has been referred to as 'the world's longest art gallery,' featuring decorations at more than 90 of its 100 stations, including sculptures, rock formations, mosaics, paintings, light installations, engravings, and reliefs created by over 150 artists.

== History ==
=== Before the Metro ===
In the late 19th century, Stockholm's suburbs expanded thanks to the development of local railways such as Djursholmsbanan and Saltsjöbanan. By 1900, electrified trams extended into the city centre, and by 1915 Stockholms Spårvägar (SS) was managing a growing tram network, including new suburban lines as the city incorporated areas such as Bromma and Brännkyrka. With further suburbs planned, it became evident that trams would not meet the city's future transport needs, prompting underground railway proposals. Stockholm's politicians were also inspired by large cities such as London, Paris and New York where metros had already been built. Through the 1920s, various investigations were carried out by the city. In 1930 a traffic committee was appointed by Stockholm's city council at the initiative of city councilor Yngve Larsson with the task of solving the capital's major traffic problems.

=== The first tunnel ===
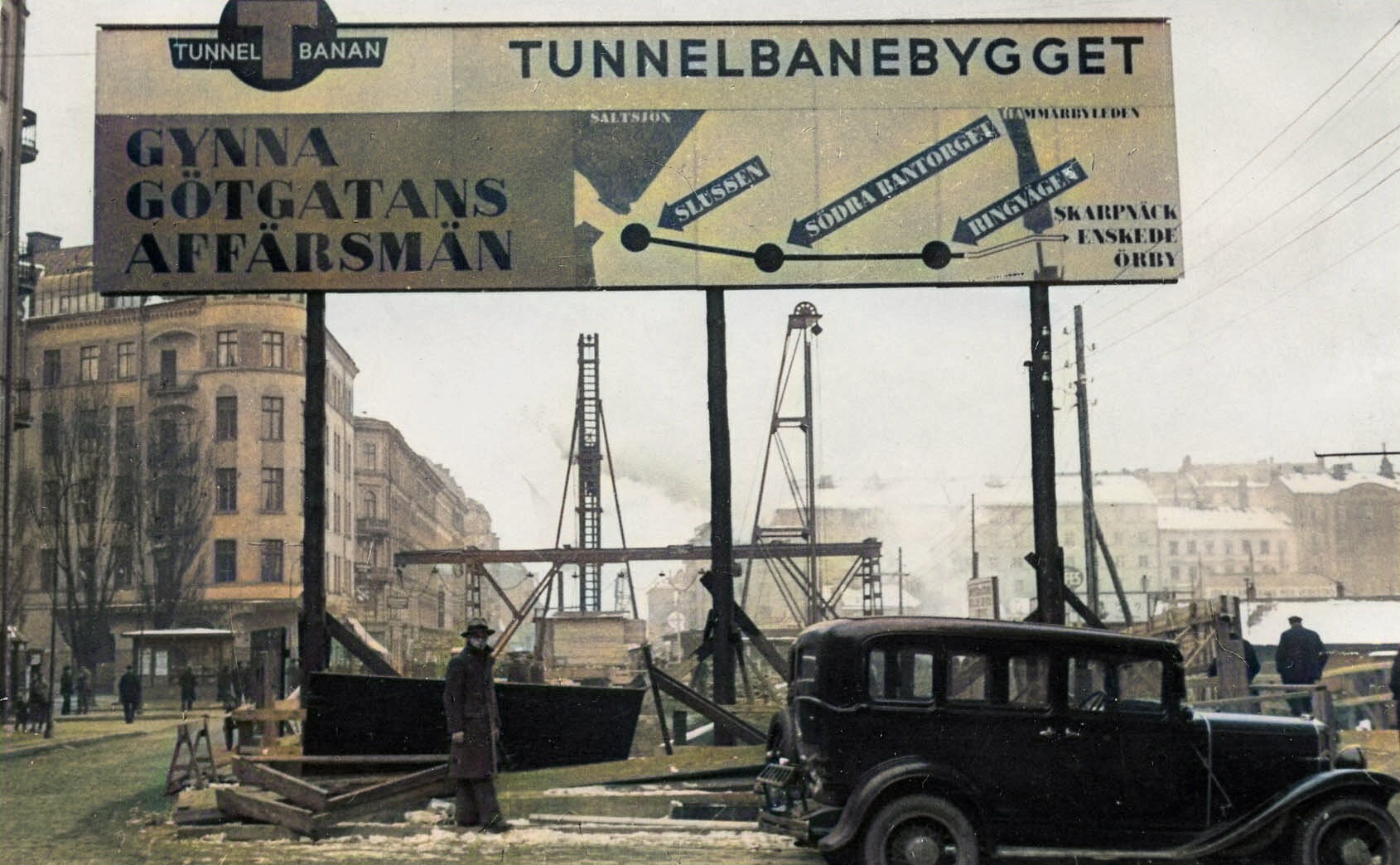
Construction of the Södertunneln in 1933

The first step towards an underground transit system was the construction of the Södertunneln tram tunnel under Södermalm. Approved by the city council on 30 March 1931, following recommendations from the 1930 Traffic Committee. Construction commenced in autumn 1931, and the project, costing 4.5 million kronor, was inaugurated on 30 September 1933. Södertunneln included three stations: Slussen, Södra Bantorget (now Medborgarplatsen), and Ringvägen (now Skanstull). The stations were designed by architect Holger Blom and inspired by Berlin's U-Bahn. The tunnel operated as a premetro service with existing tramlines connecting to it. This project marked the first use of the term "Tunnelbanan," and the first use of station entrances distinguished by a "T" in a circle.

=== Plans for a full-scale metro system ===
The 1930s also brought significant changes to the political and economic landscape of housing construction in Stockholm, with a new municipal plan for multi-family dwellings in the suburbs. A considerable debate unfolded across political parties, but a metro system came to be viewed as the optimal solution to the city's housing crisis and increasing congestion in the city centre.

In 1941, Stockholm City Council voted to develop a large-scale metro system, based on plans from the 1930 Traffic Committee and a further 1940 report. This decision called for the Södertunneln and southern suburban tram lines to be extended to Norrmalm, connecting with the western suburban tram lines through a tunnel under Sveavägen.

=== Initial construction ===
The Stockholm Metro's formal construction began in 1944, following the 1941 city council decision. The first focus was extending the Södertunneln southward, beyond Gullmarsplan. During this period, several other lines were built to premetro standards, including routes from Kristineberg to Islandstorget, using the new Tranebergsbron bridge; Skanstull to Blåsut, including construction of the Skanstullsbron bridge; and Telefonplan to Hägerstensåsen.

In late 1944, a population study revealed that Stockholm's rapid population growth would demand greater capacity for the planned metro. As a result, two significant decisions were made: the line between T-Centralen and Slussen would be constructed with four tracks instead of two, and platform lengths were increased from six-car (100 meters) to eight-car (145 meters) to accommodate more passengers.

=== Full metro ===
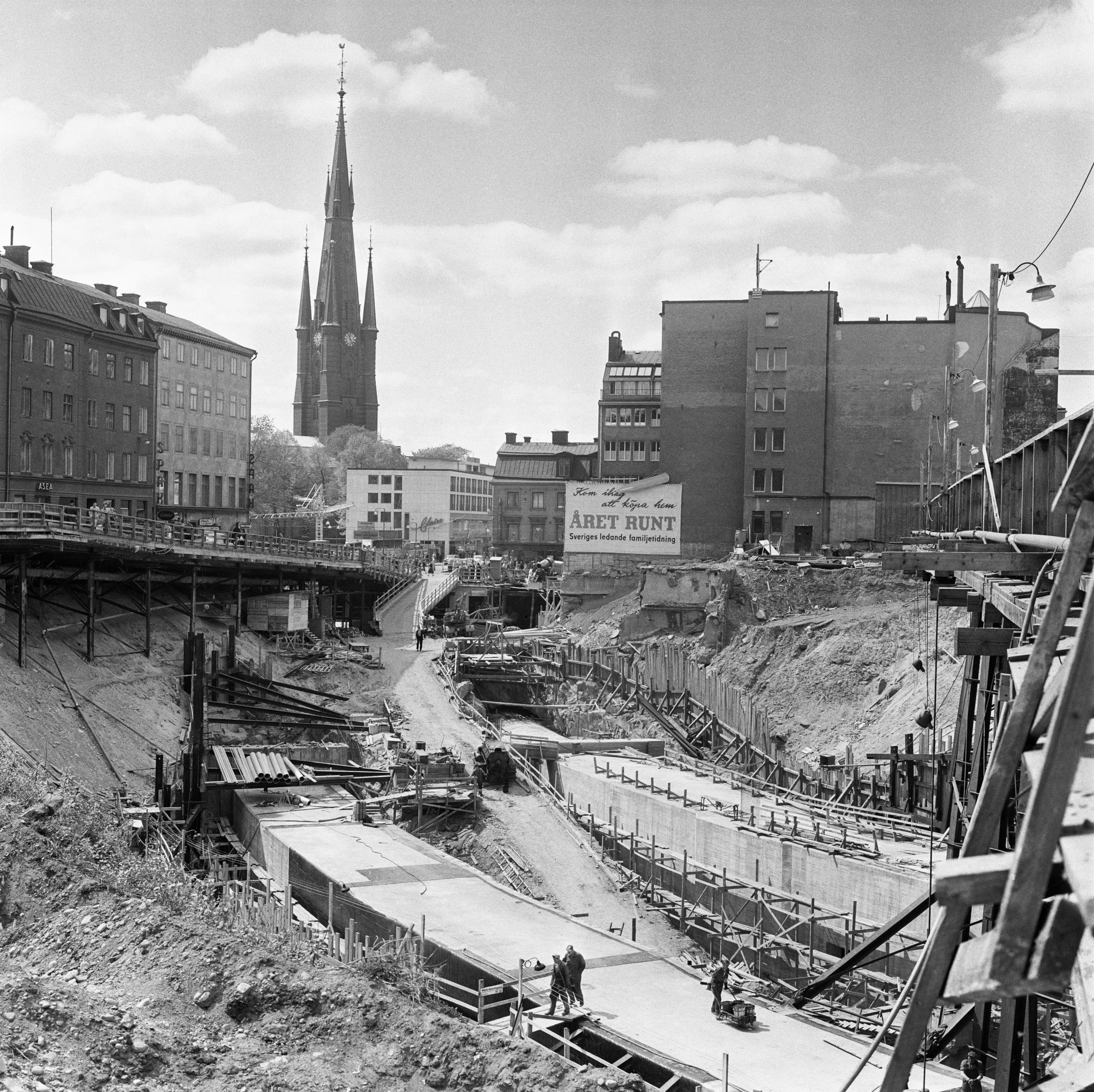
Construction of a section of the Metro just north of T-Centralen in 1957

The first part of the Metro was opened on 1 October 1950, from Slussen to Hökarängen, having been converted from tram to metro operation. In 1951, a second branch from Slussen to Stureby was opened (which was also tram operated until then). In 1952, a second line, from Hötorget to the western suburbs was opened. In 1957, the two parts were connected with a line between Hötorget and Slussen, with two new intermediate stations: T-Centralen, adjacent to Stockholm Central station, Gamla stan in Stockholm's old town, forming the Green Line. Through the 1950s, the Green Line was extended piece by piece.

The Red Line was opened in 1964, from T-Centralen over Liljeholmen ending in Fruängen and Örnsberg, both in the Southwest. It was extended piece by piece until 1978, when it reached Mörby centrum via a bridge over Stocksundet sea strait.

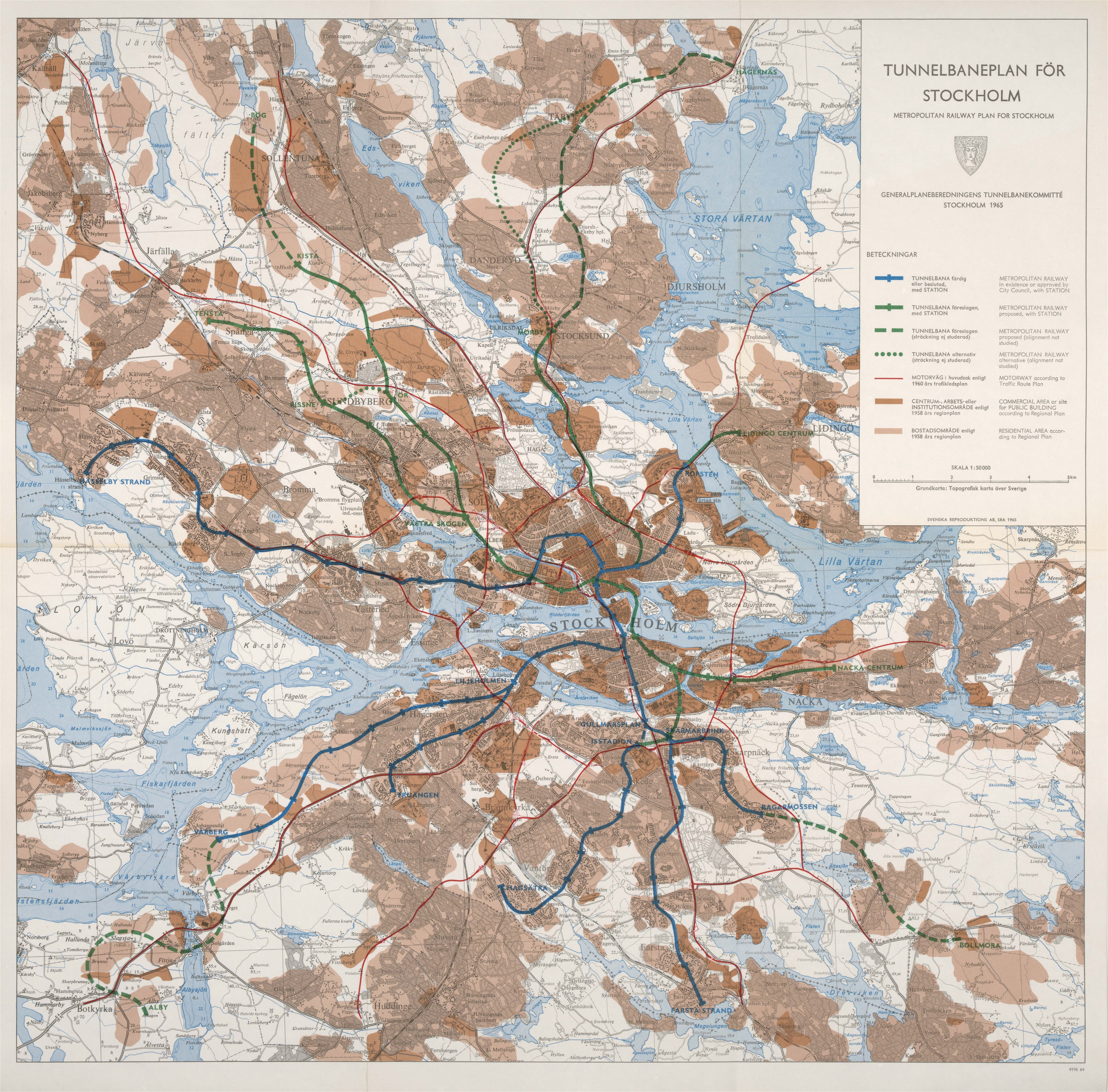
The 1965 Metropolitan Railway Plan for Stockholm which follows the current route alignments closely

The third and final system, the Blue Line, was opened in 1975, with two lines running northwest from the city center. As the construction requirements have become more strict over the years, newer segments have more tunnels than older ones, and the Blue Line is almost entirely tunnelled. The latest addition to the whole network, Skarpnäck station, was opened in 1994.

== Network ==
=== Stations ===
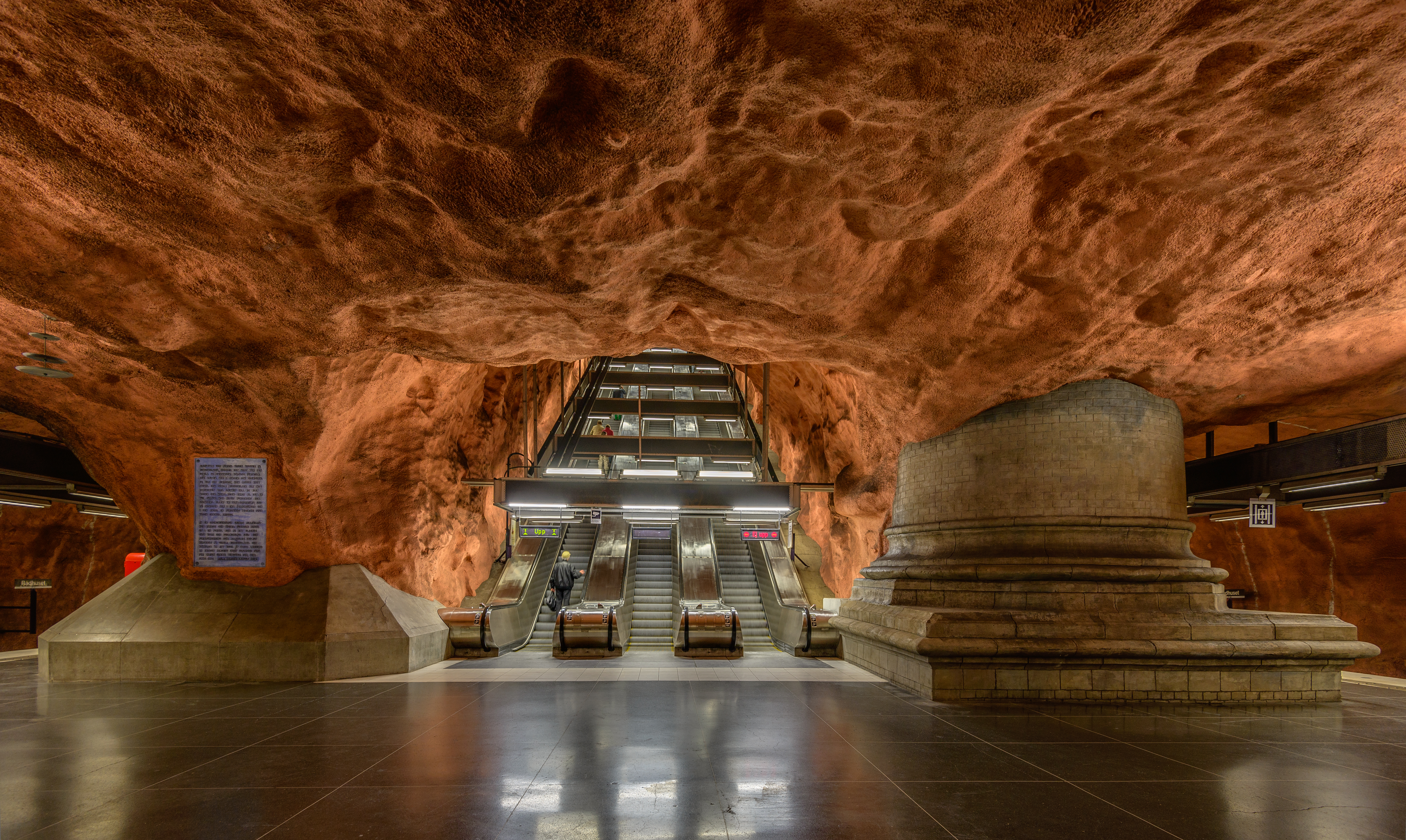
Escalators at Rådhuset station on the Blue Line

There are 100 stations in use in the Stockholm Metro (of which 47 are underground). One station, Kymlinge, was built but never put into use. One station has been taken out of use and demolished. The old surface station at Bagarmossen was demolished and replaced with a new underground station, this being prior to the metro extension to the Skarpnäck metro station.

The Stockholm Metro is well known for the decoration of its stations. Several of the stations (especially on the Blue Line) are left with the bedrock exposed, crude and unfinished, or as part of the decorations..

=== Lines ===
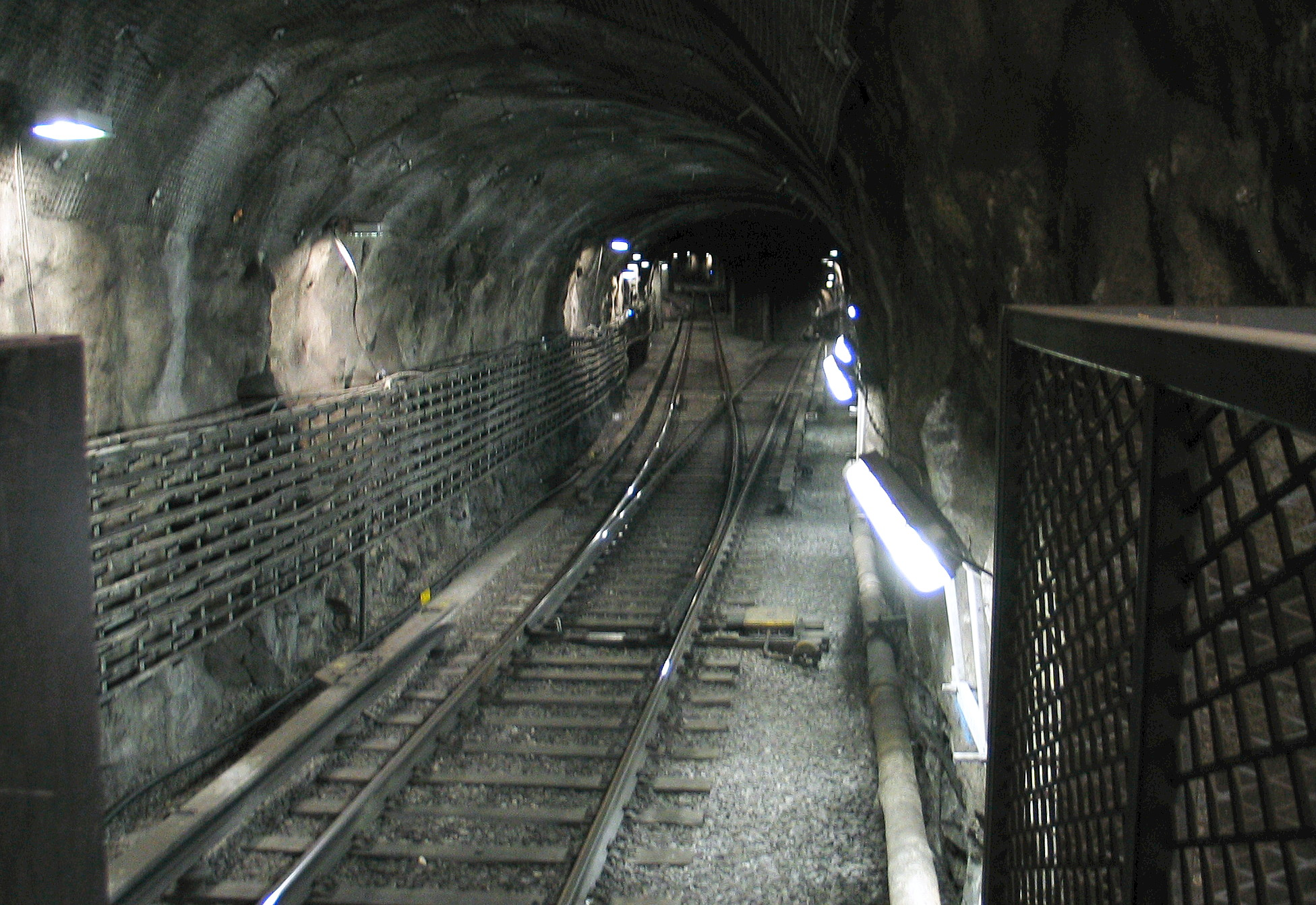
Tunnels near Östermalmstorg station

Near-geographically accurate map of the Stockholm Metro

The current network designations — Blue Line, Green Line, and Red Line — have been in informal use since the late 1970s and were officially adopted in the 1990s. The names originated from the train liveries: the Blue Line operated newer blue-painted trains, while the Green Line used older stock in the original green color. No trains were painted red; instead, red (initially orange) was selected for maps to visually distinguish this line from the others.

==== Green Line ====
The Green Line (officially Tunnelbana 1, or "Metro 1") has three routes and 49 stations: 12 underground (nine concrete, three rock) and 37 above ground stations. It is 41.256 kilometres (25.635 mi) long. It was opened on 1 October 1950 (between Slussen and Hökarängen) and is used by 451,000 passengers per workday or 146 million per year (2005).

==== Red Line ====
The Red Line (officially Tunnelbana 2, or "Metro 2") has two routes and 36 stations: 20 underground (four concrete, 16 rock) and 15 above ground stations. It is 41.238 kilometres (25.624 mi) long (only 18 metres (59 ft) shorter than the Green Line), and was opened on 5 April 1964. It is used by 394,000 passengers per workday or 128 million per year (2005).

==== Blue Line ====
The Blue Line (officially Tunnelbana 3, or "Metro 3") has two routes and 20 stations: 19 underground (all rock) and one elevated station. It is 25.516 kilometres (15.855 mi) long. It was opened on 31 August 1975 and is used by 171,000 passengers per workday or 55 million per year (2005).

==== General information ====
Trains operate from 05:00 to 01:00, with extended around-the-clock service on Fridays and Saturdays. All lines have trains every 10 minutes during the day outside of rush hour, reduced to every 15 minutes in early mornings and late evenings, and every 30 minutes at night. Additional trains (often running on shorter routes) during peak hours increase the service frequency to every 4–6 minutes on most stations of the networks, while waiting times on the central parts of the Green Line and the Red Line can go as low as 2–3 minutes.

The Metro contains four interchange stations (T-Centralen, Slussen, Gamla stan and Fridhemsplan) and lacks any kind of circular or partly circular line, although Stockholm has a semi-circular light rail line, Tvärbanan, and a chord-like Yellow Line is set to open in 2034. A wide majority of the Metro's stations are located in suburbs, but the network is centred on T-Centralen where all trains in the entire network pass.

In the past, there have been additional route numbers in use for trains operated on part of a line, or during peak hours only. For example, route 23 was used for a peak relief train for route 13, which in the 1970s was operated between Sätra and Östermalmstorg and during the 1990s between Norsborg and Mörby centrum.

Line	Stretch	Travel time	Length	Stations (in "innerstan")
10	Kungsträdgården – Hjulsta	23 min	15.1 km (9.4 mi)	14, (5)
11	Kungsträdgården – Akalla	22 min	15.6 km (9.7 mi)	12, (5)
13	Norsborg – Ropsten	44 min	26.6 km (16.5 mi)	25, (10)
14	Fruängen – Mörby centrum	33 min	19.5 km (12.1 mi)	19, (9)
17	Skarpnäck – Åkeshov	43 min	19.6 km (12.2 mi)	24, (12)
18	Farsta strand – Alvik	37 min	18.4 km (11.4 mi)	23, (12)
19	Hagsätra – Hässelby strand	55 min	28.6 km (17.8 mi)	35, (12)
Entire Metro network			108 km (67 mi)	100, (25)

There is a connection to the main rail network, which is used for deliveries of new trains and some other purposes. In this case trains are pulled by locomotives since the electrical and other standards are different. This connection consists of a track to Tvärbanan at the Globen station and a rail track from the Liljeholmen Tvärbanan station to the Älvsjö railway station.

== Rolling stock ==
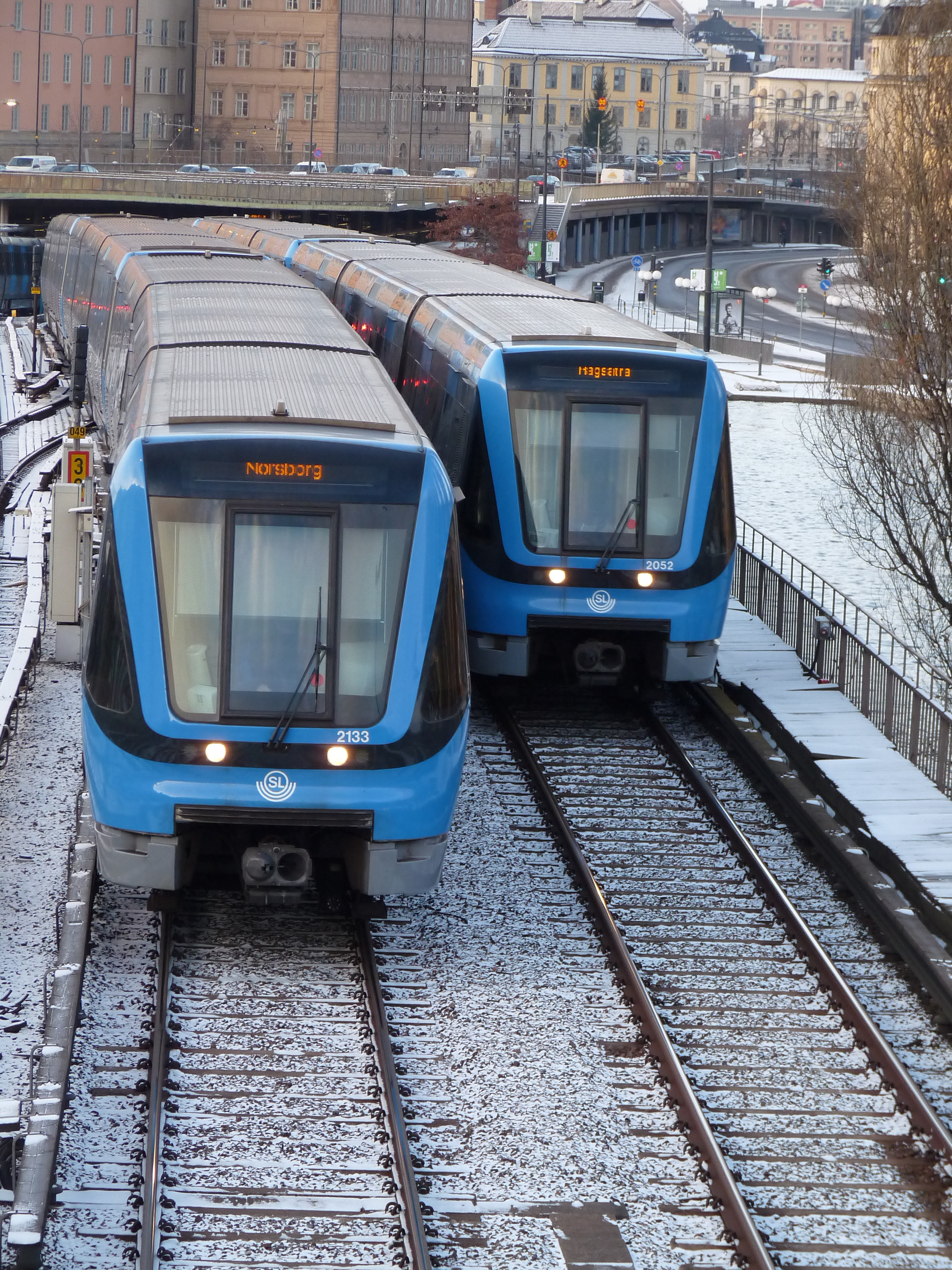
SL C20

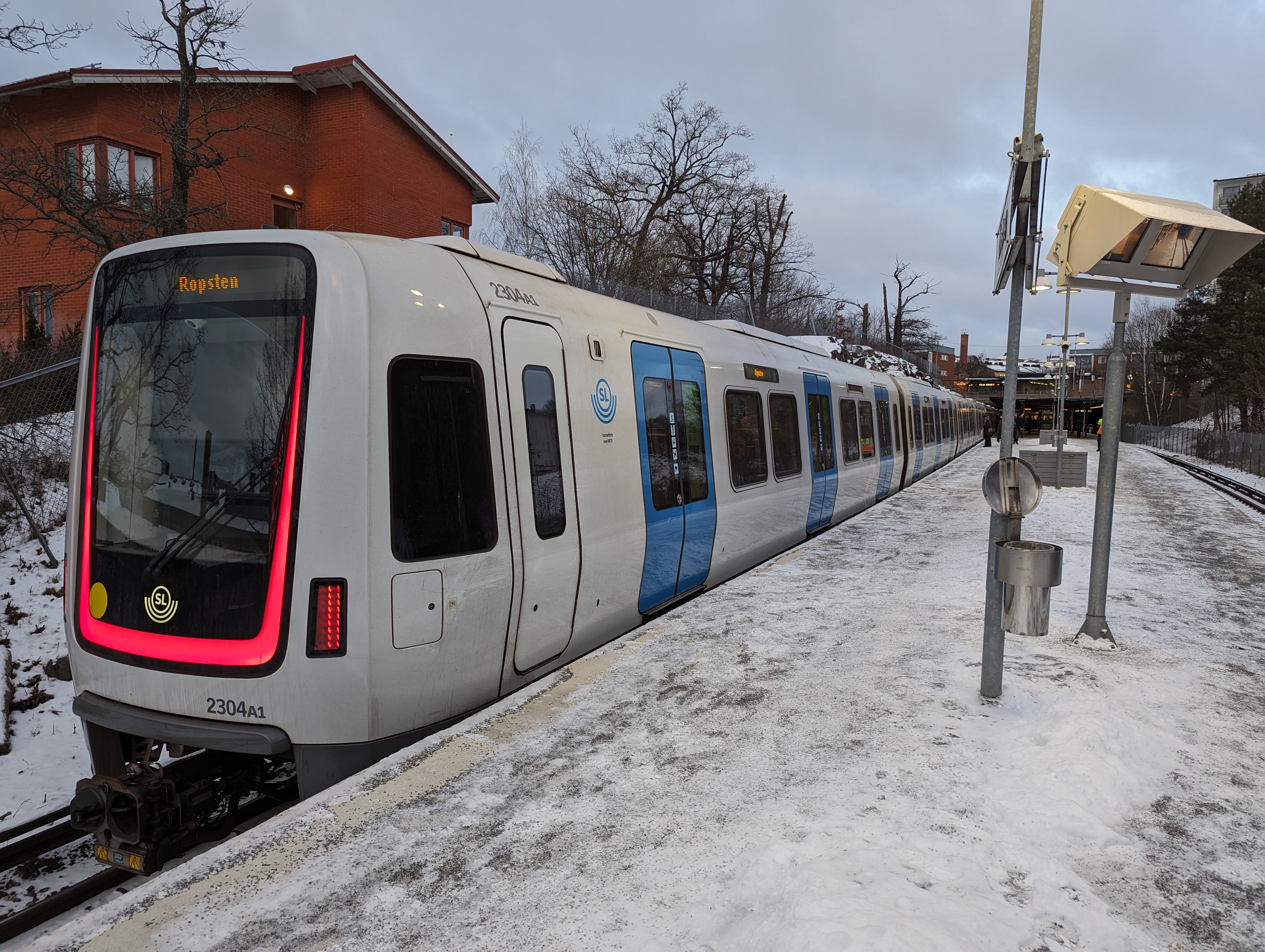
SL C30

The Stockholm Metro operates two main types of rolling stock: the SL C20 and SL C30. Previously, the system used the older C1–C15 trains, collectively known as the Cx stock. These trains were gradually retired, and fully discontinued by 2024 after more than 40 years of service.

Currently, the Stockholm Metro operates 271 trainsets of the C20 stock and 116 trainsets of the C30 stock. The Green Line exclusively uses the C20 stock, while the Blue Line also primarily relies on C20 trains. The Red Line uses mostly C30 trainsets. Stockholm Metro's trains are based at several depots, including Hammarby, Högdalen, and Vällingby depots for the Green Line; Norsborg depot and Nyboda depot for the Red Line; and Rissne depot for the Blue Line.

Train configuration varies depending on the stock type, however a full-length train measures approximately 140 metres (460 ft) and accommodates around 1,250 passengers, with seating available for 290 to 380 people. C20 trains are typically composed of two or three trainsets connected in double or triple configurations, resulting in trains with six or nine cars. C30 trains consist of two trainsets connected in a double configuration, forming an eight-car train. The now-retired Cx stock operated in six or eight-car configurations.

The Blue Line, along with the Red Line between Stadion and Mörby Centrum, were built with longer platforms to accommodate ten-car Cx stock trains. However, when the C20 trains were introduced, it became apparent that configurations of four C20 trainsets—equivalent in length to ten Cx stock cars—were too long for the platforms. As a result, ten-car trains only operated on the Blue Line, where most platforms (except at Husby) were designed to accommodate their length. On the Red Line, most platforms were only long enough to accommodate eight-car Cx stock trains. As a result, ten-car trains were never used in service on the Red Line, except at the six stations between Stadion and Mörby Centrum, which could accommodate them.

The naming convention for rolling stock reflects the system's history: the prefix A denotes motorised trams, B indicates unmotorised tram trailers, and C is used for metro cars. The Stockholm Metro traces its origins to a tramway system, and the older sections of the Metro operated as tramways for several years before conversion.

=== Current rolling stock ===
==== C20 ====
The C20 stock (also branded C25 or C20U during refurbishment) is double-articulated, 46.5 metres (152 ft 7 in) in length, 2.9 metres (9 ft 6 in) in width, 3.8 metres (12 ft 6 in) in height, and weighs 67 tonnes (66 long tons; 74 short tons). It uses only four bogies, two under the middle part, and one under each end part of car. The car takes 126 seated passengers, and 288 standing passengers. Three such units normally form a train. The C20 stock cars were built between 1997 and 2004 and first entered service in 1998.

A single prototype car designated C20F stock is in use. Built on Bombardier Transportation's FICAS technology, it has a lighter body, much thinner side walls, and more space compared to the regular C20, by using a sandwich-like composite construction of the body. It also has air-conditioning for passenger area, whereas standard C20 has air-conditioning only for the driver's cab. However, only the last 70 C20 units produced (2200-2270) are equipped with air conditioning in the drivers cab. All other C20 units completely lack air conditioning. Therefore, units lacking air conditioning are usually placed in the middle of trains and moved to the blue line during the summer, where the air conditioning is the least needed, as it is almost exclusively underground. The C20F weighs 65 tonnes (64 long tons; 72 short tons), other exterior measurements are the same as for the C20. The C20F has the same number of seats as the C20, but has space for 323 standing passengers.

After about 20 years in service (22 years for the oldest cars and 16 years for the youngest cars), the C20 had reached about half its lifetime, and a refurbishment was necessary. The first refurbished train set (three cars) was officially put into service on 20 November 2020. The refurbishment of all cars was completed in 2024. These refurbished cars, also known as C25, feature an upgraded interior similar to the C30 among other improvements. All original C20 units had been refurbished by February 2024.

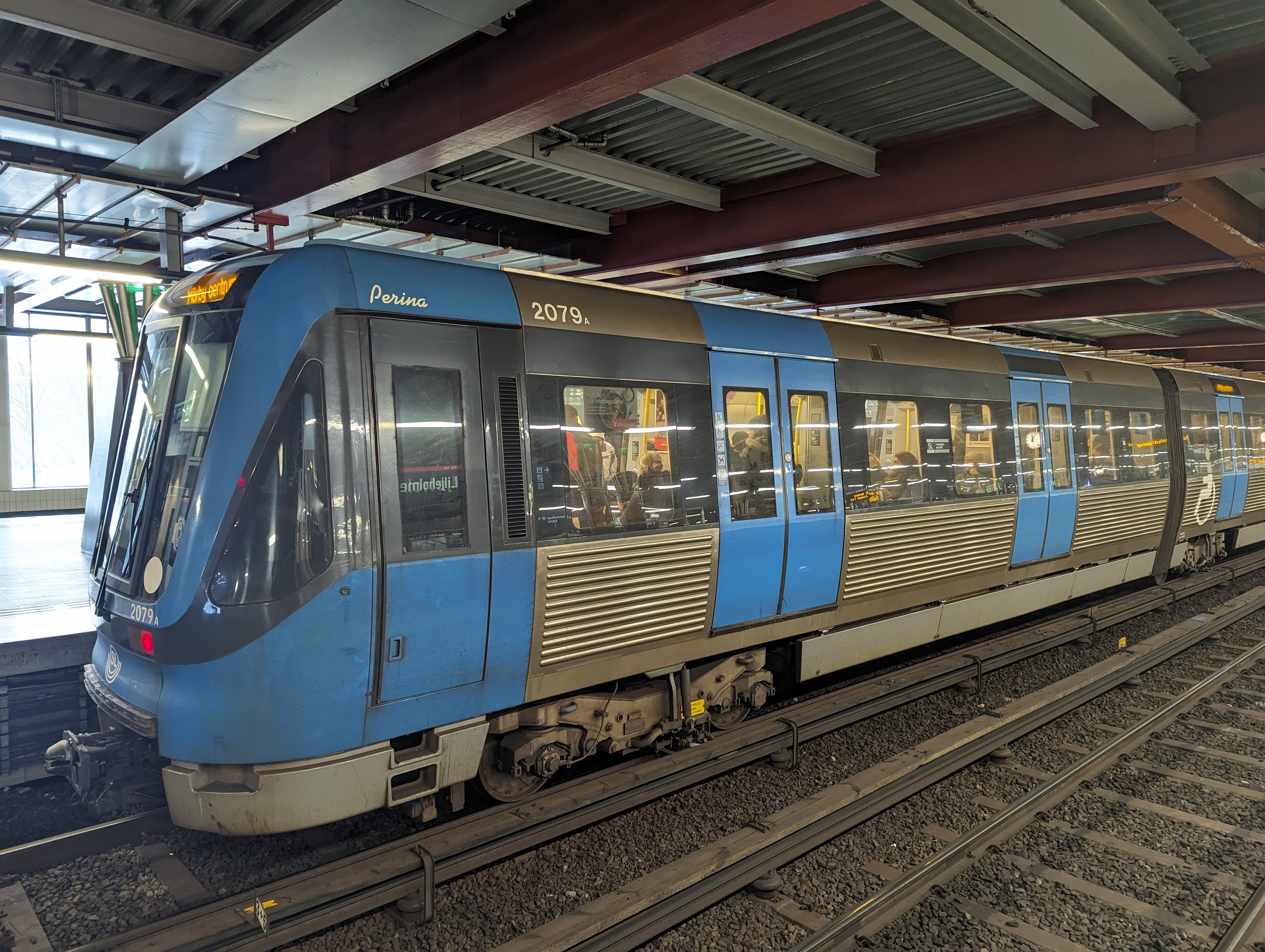
C20 at Liljeholmen

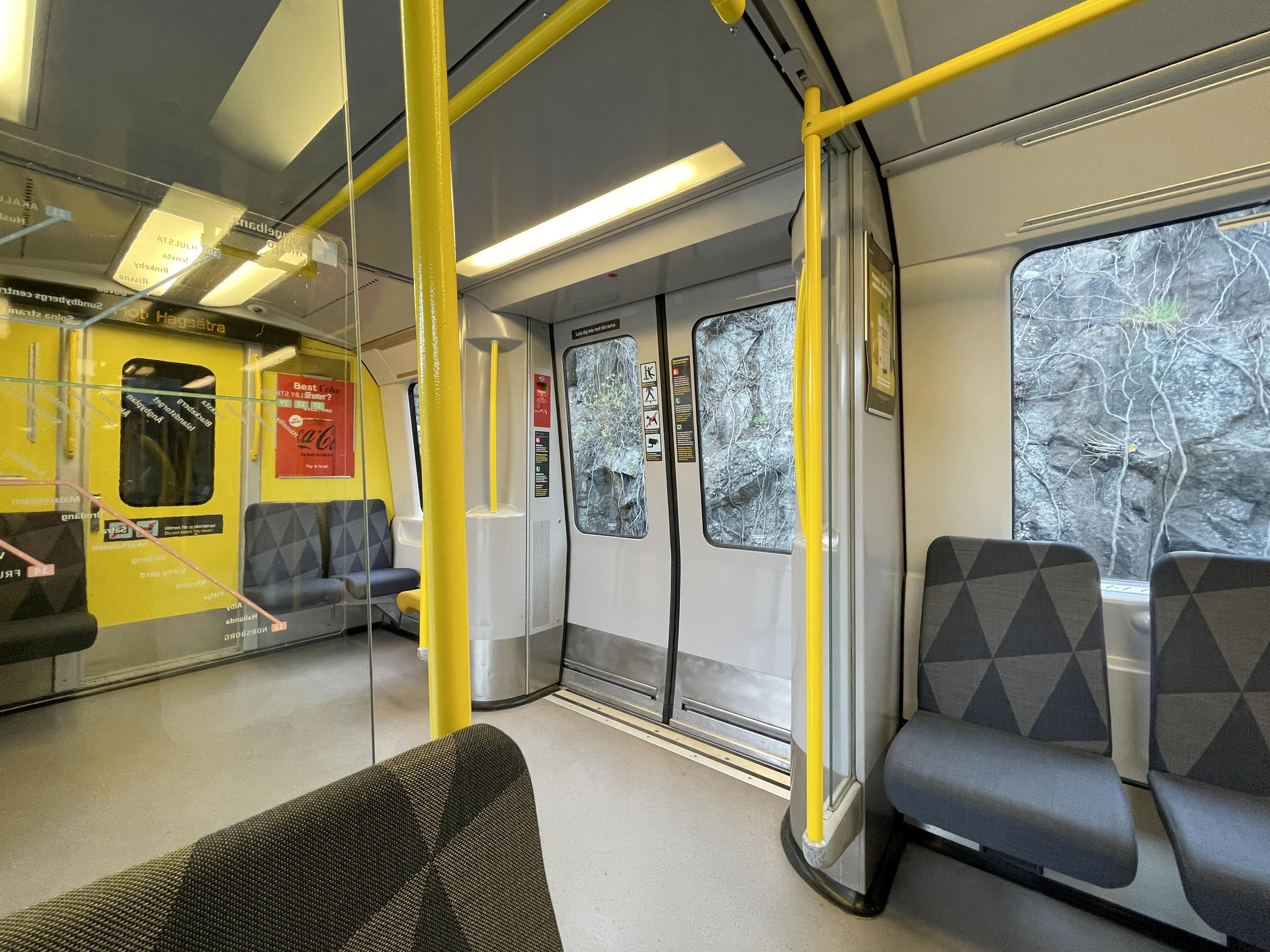
C20 with the refurbished interior

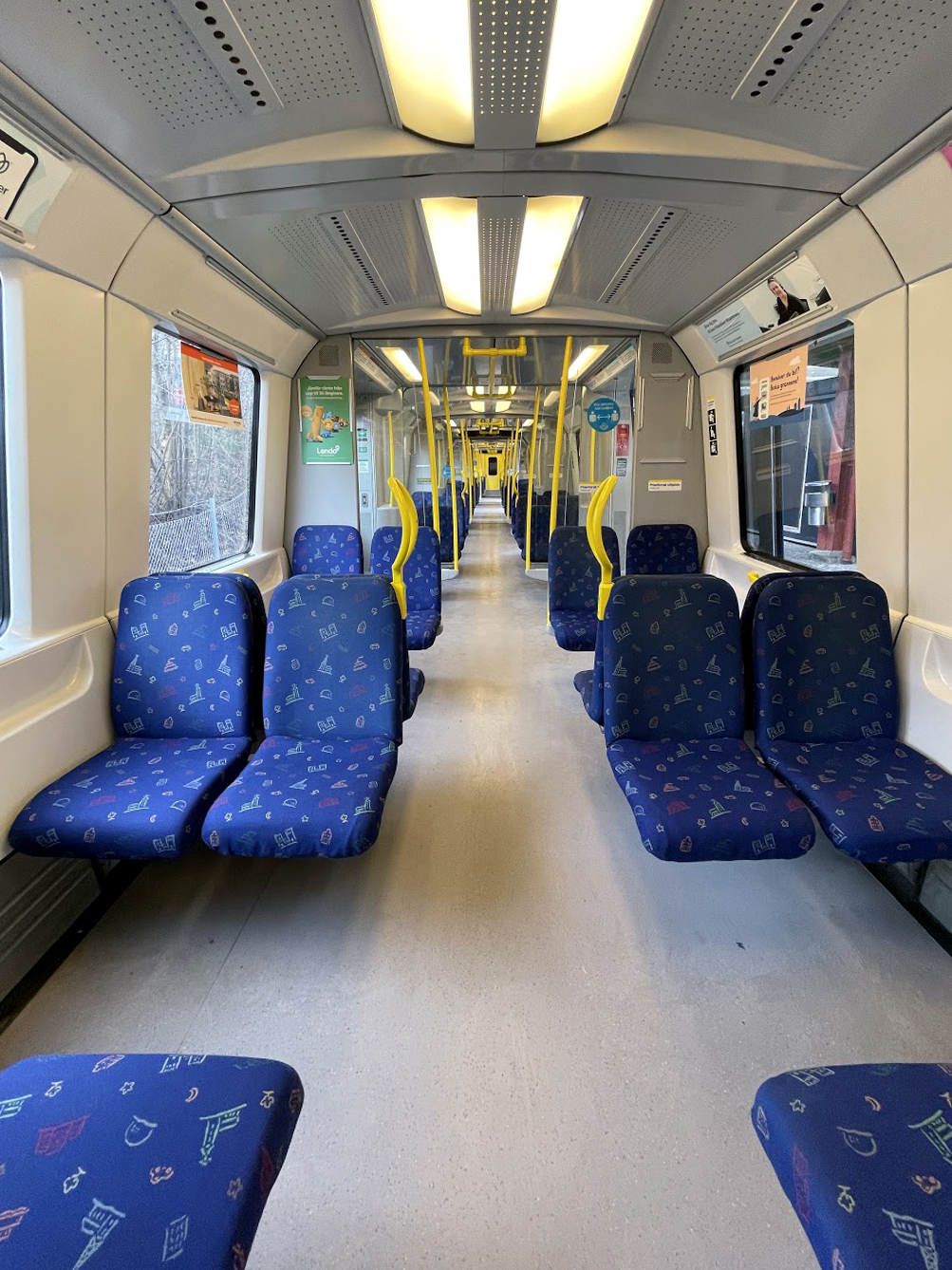
C20 with original interior

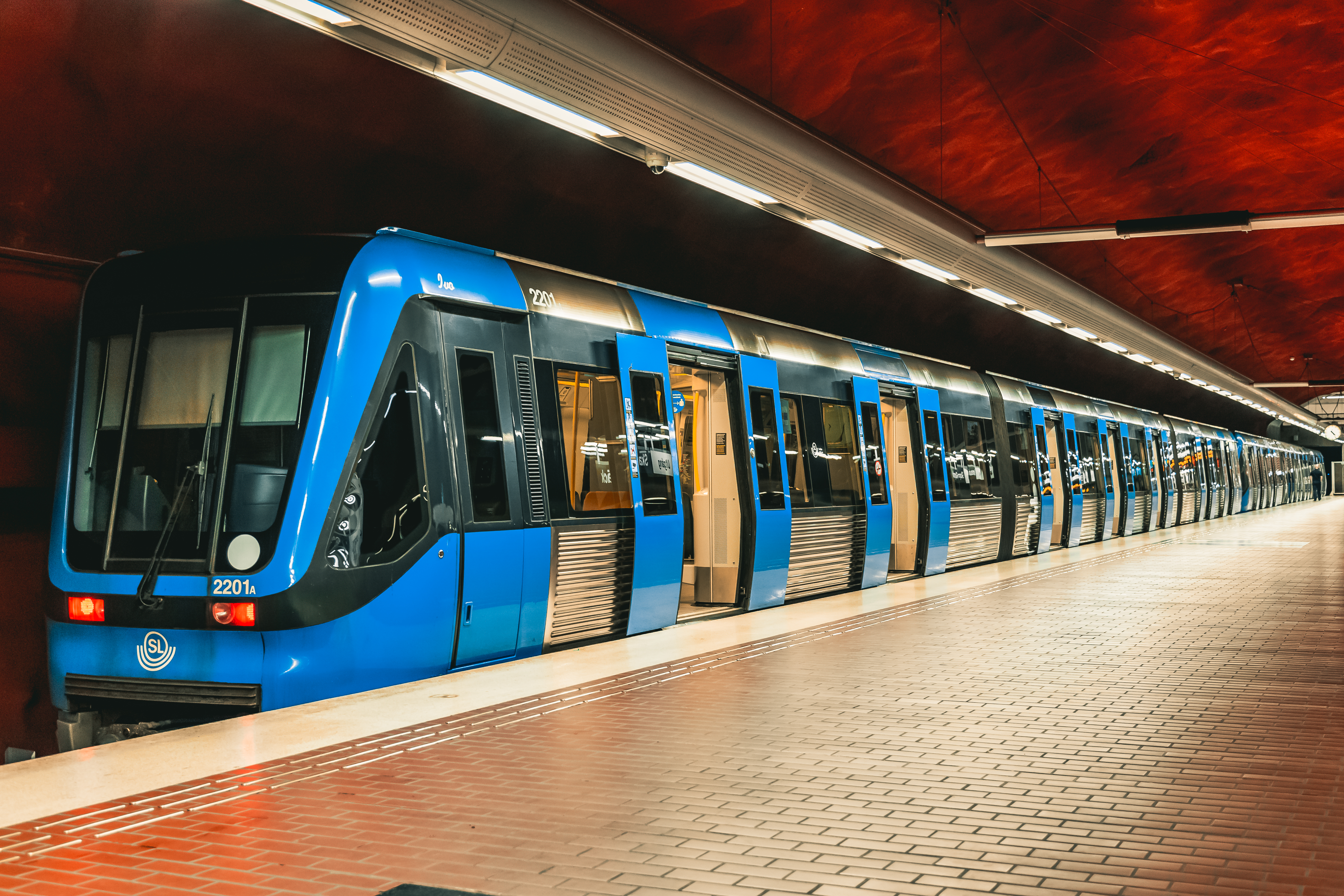
C20 at Skarpnäck

==== C30 ====
The C30 is a new articulated train type manufactured by Bombardier Transportation which is delivered since 2018 for use on the Red Line. The first C30 train entered service on the Red Line on 11 August 2020. They are formed in semi-permanent four car units with open gangways between cars, and with two bogies under each car. Two such units form a train. Compared to previous stock, the cars have fewer seats arranged in mixed longitudinal/transverse layout for increased capacity, similar to the C1 and refurbished C20 trains. The C30 is the first full Stockholm metro train type to feature air-conditioning in both the passenger compartments and driver's cabs and are expected to cost 5 billion kronor.

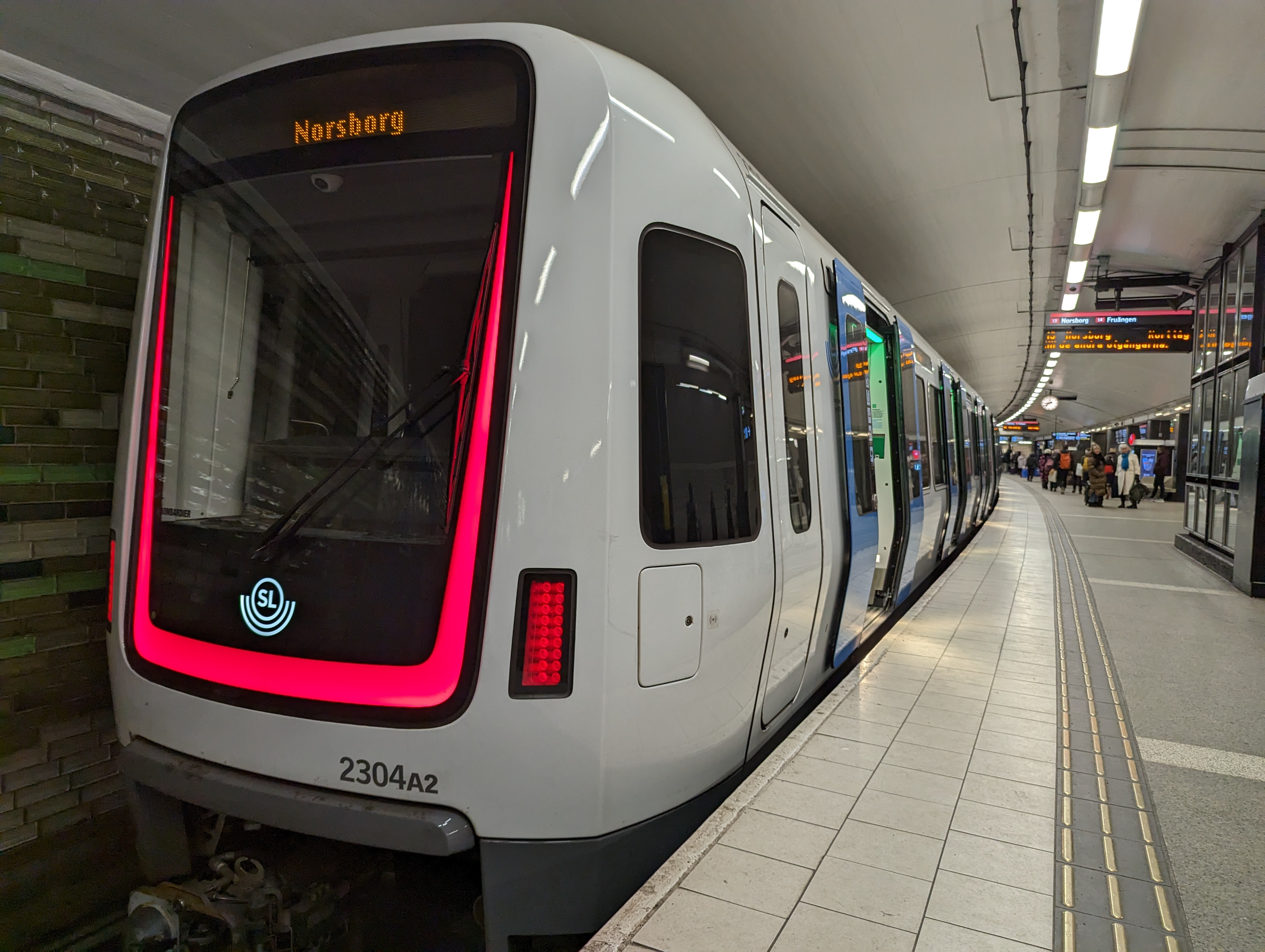
C30 at T-Centralen, views of the driver's cabin

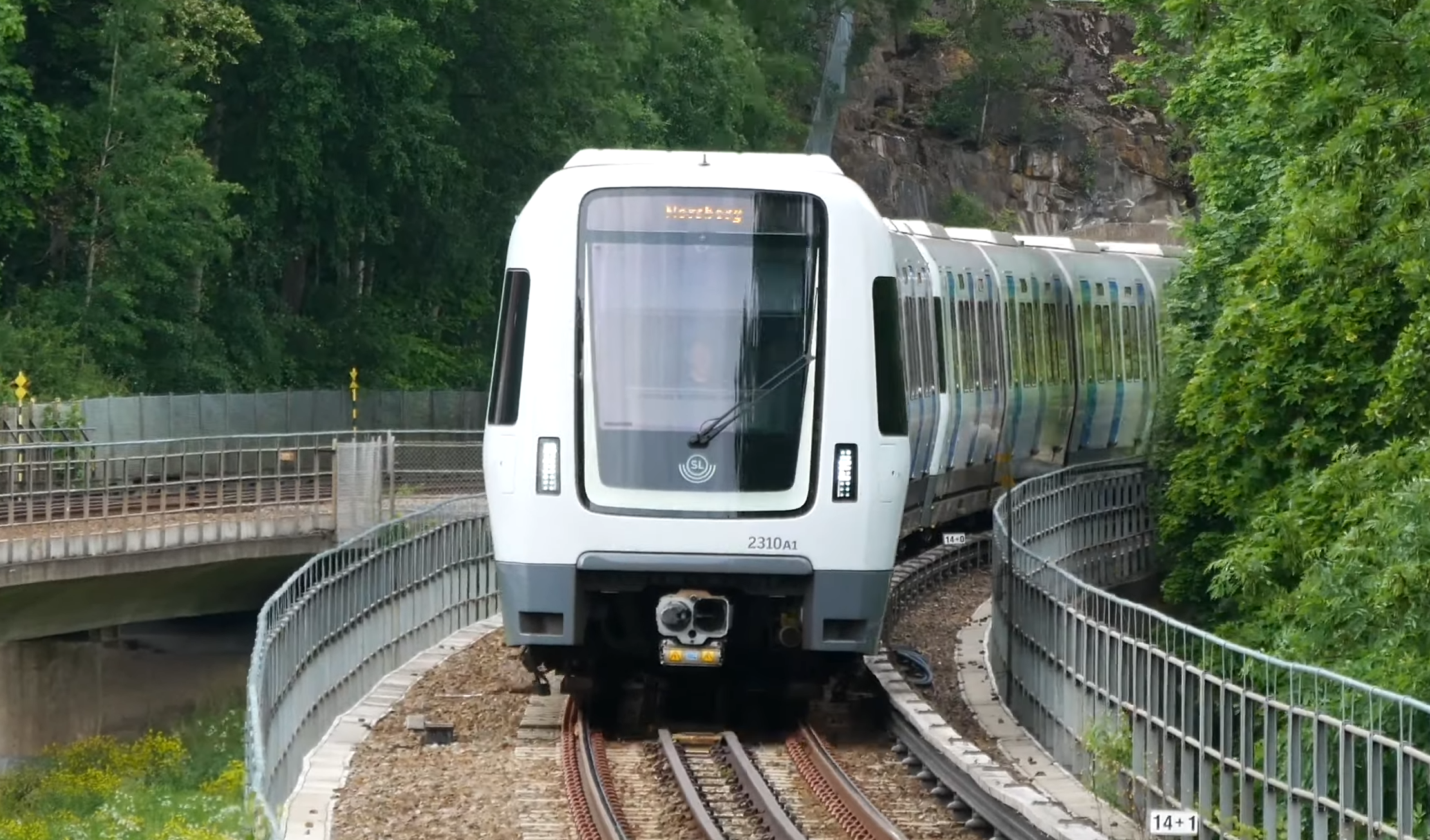
C30 approaching Vårby gård

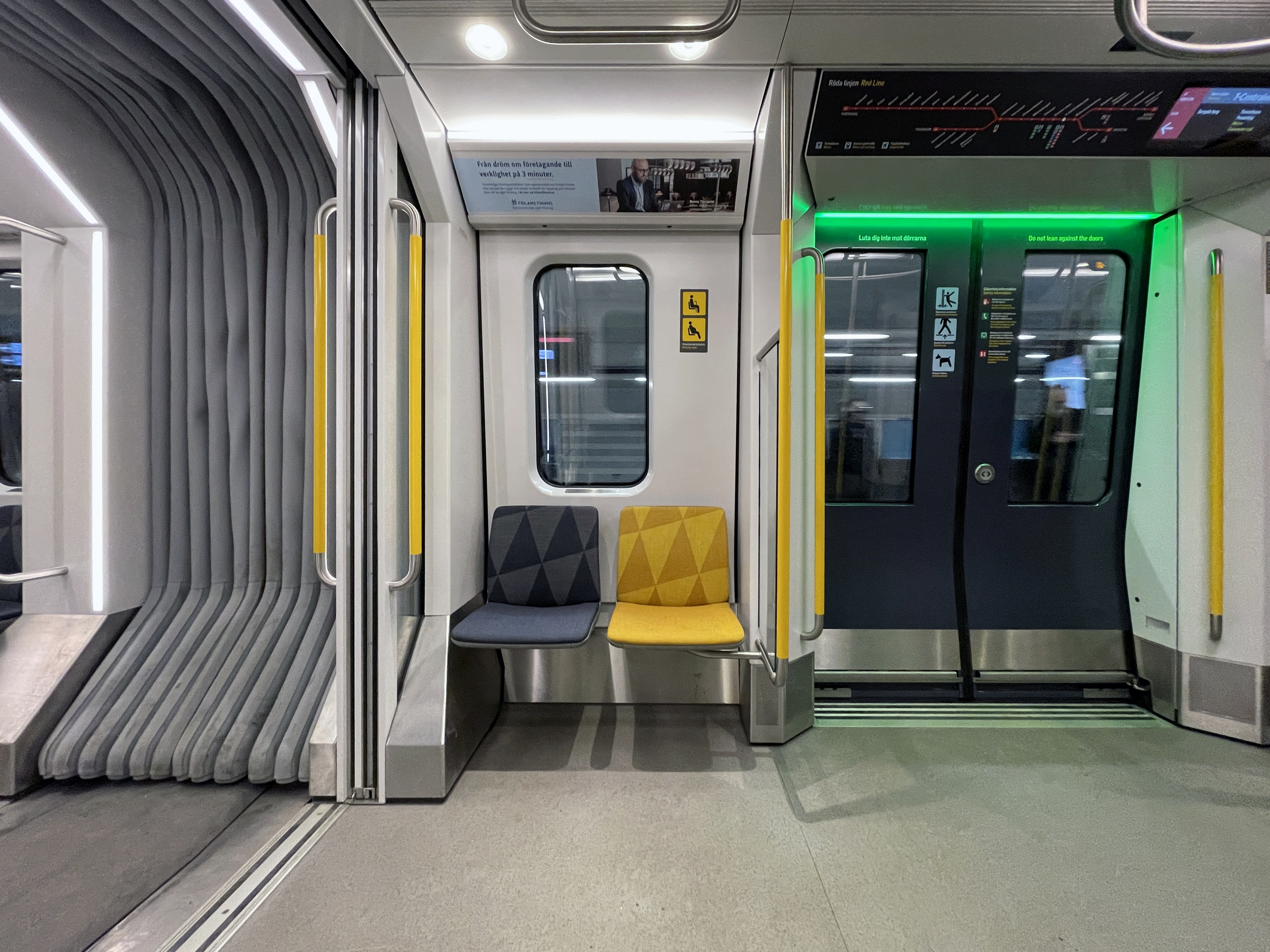
C30 interior, view of the doors

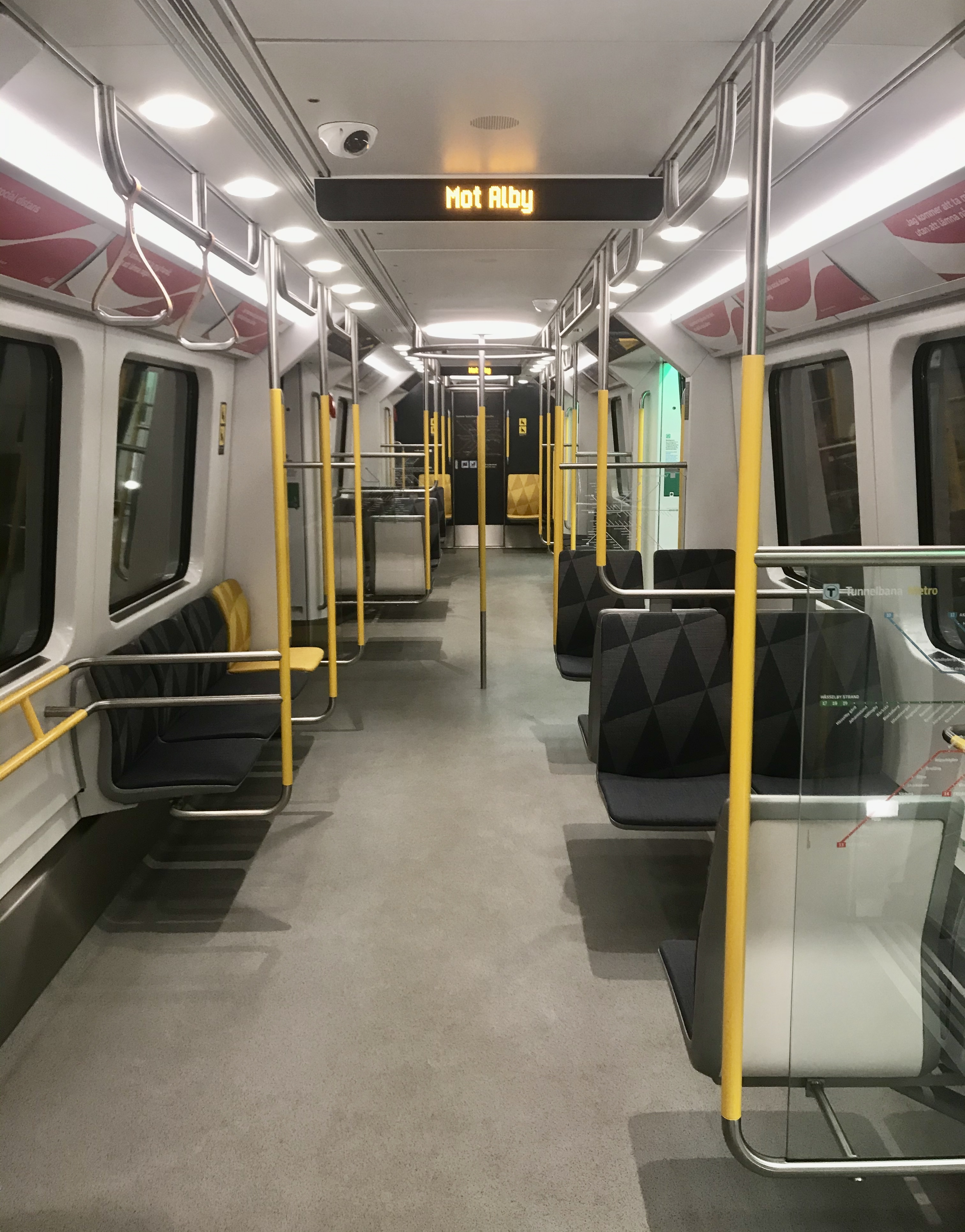
C30 interior, views of the seating areas

=== Former rolling stock ===
==== Cx (C1 - C15) ====
The name Cx collectively refers to all the older types C1–C15. The last ride with a Cx car in the Stockholm Metro took place on 10 February 2024 on a C14 car. C14 were 17.32 m (56 ft 10 in) to 17.62 m (57 ft 10 in) in length, 2.8 m (9 ft 2 in) in width, 3.70 m (12 ft 2 in) to 3.78 m (12 ft 5 in) in height, and weigh 29 metric tons. The cars took 48 seated passengers, and 108 to 110 standing passengers. The C14 and C15 trains were built in the mid-1980s. As of 12 January 2024, the C6, C14 and C15 have been taken out of service permanently.

Class	Introduced	Withdrawn	Notes
C1	1950	1984	Some units were rebuilt to C2 and C3 units
C2	1950	1999	The type with the most train sets produced (348 in total)
C3	1957	1999	Were not equipped with complete drivers cabs, could only run in the middle of trains
C4	1960	2003	Were the first units to feature a driver's cab in only one end of the unit
C5	1963	1996	Eight prototype cars with an unpainted aluminium exterior, nicknamed Silverpilen (the Silver Arrow). The doors were outlying sliding doors.
C6	1970	2023	First model with modernised driver's cabin
C7	1972	2004	Prototype cars
C8/C8H	1974	2004	Four units were rebuilt for service on the Saltsjöbanan in the year 2000
C9	1976	2009	
C12	1977	2001	Were built using old technology from the C1, C2 and C3 types
C13/C13H	1982	2003	Some units were rebuilt into C13H stock in 1995–1997.
C14	1985	2024	The C14 was the longest-surviving Cx car in the Stockholm Metro. Its final ride took place on 10 February 2024.
C14z	1987	1999	Prototype cars which were used as testbeds for technology that would later be used on the C20 trains. Only 4 cars (a half length train) were ever built.
C15	1985	2023	C15 was the last model of the Cx cars, and they were constructed at the same time as C14.

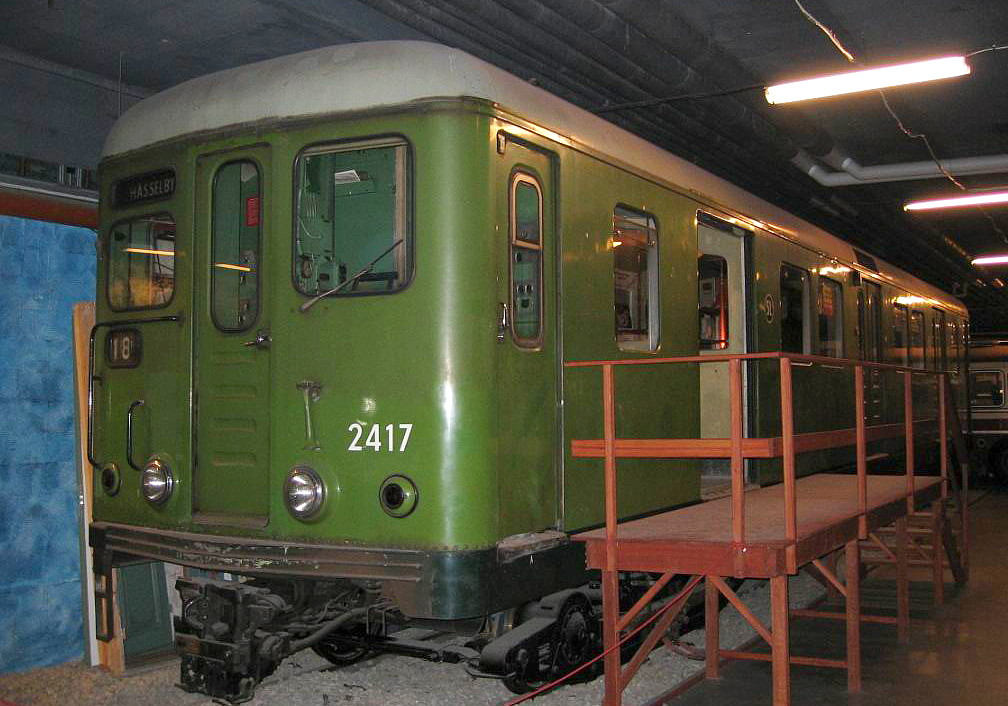
Preserved C2 carriage, February 2005

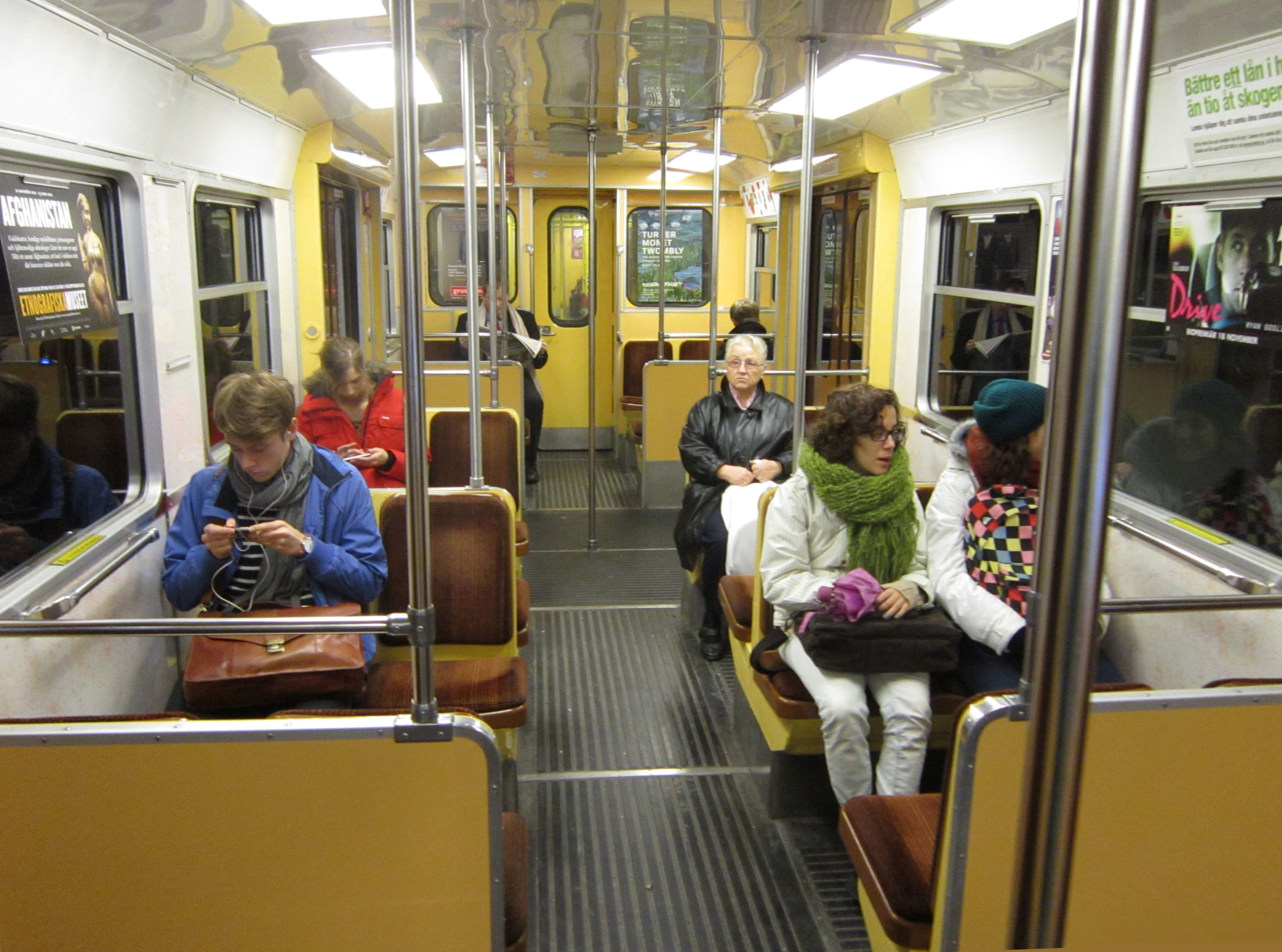
Interior of a C6H type car

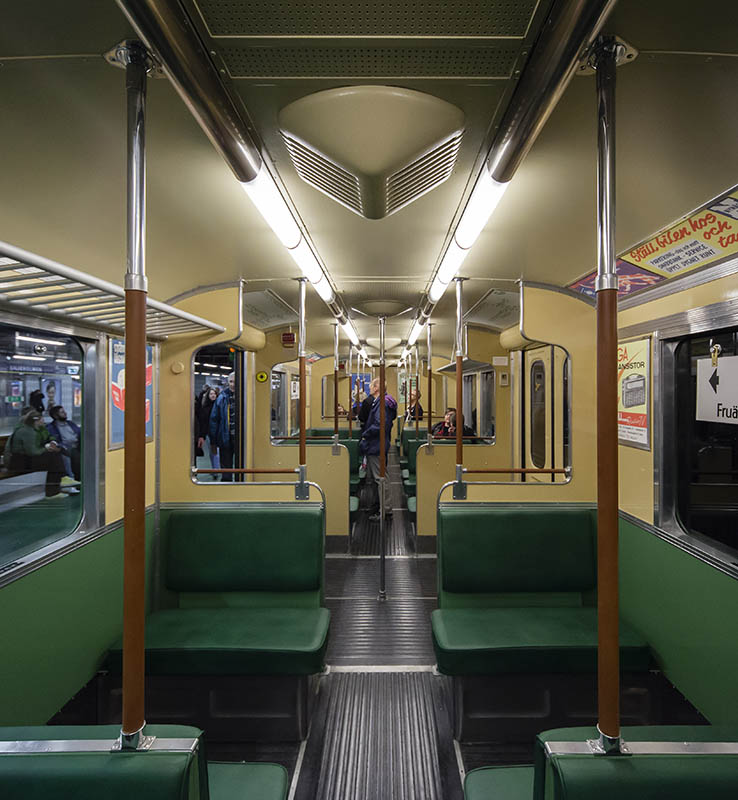
Interior of a preserved and restored C2 car that is part of a vintage train

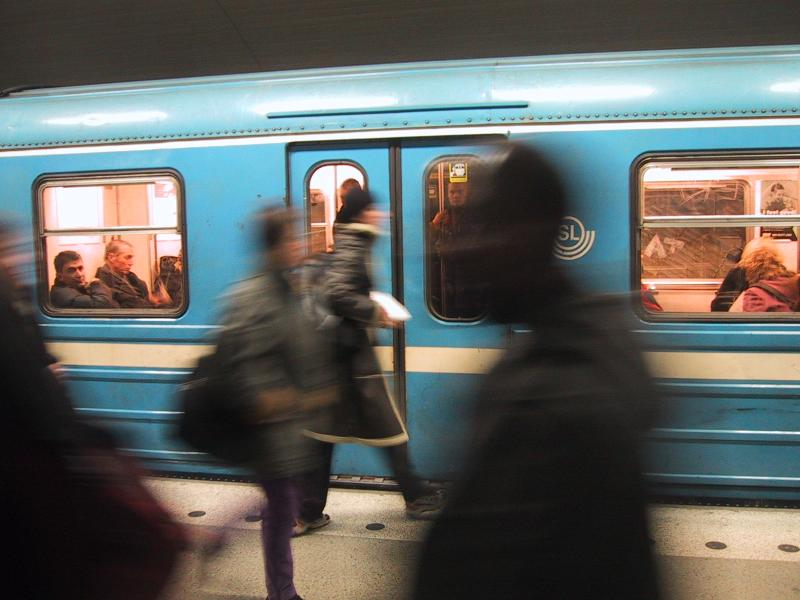
A train of older stock, type C4. All C4s were taken out of service in 2003.

== Infrastructure and operation ==
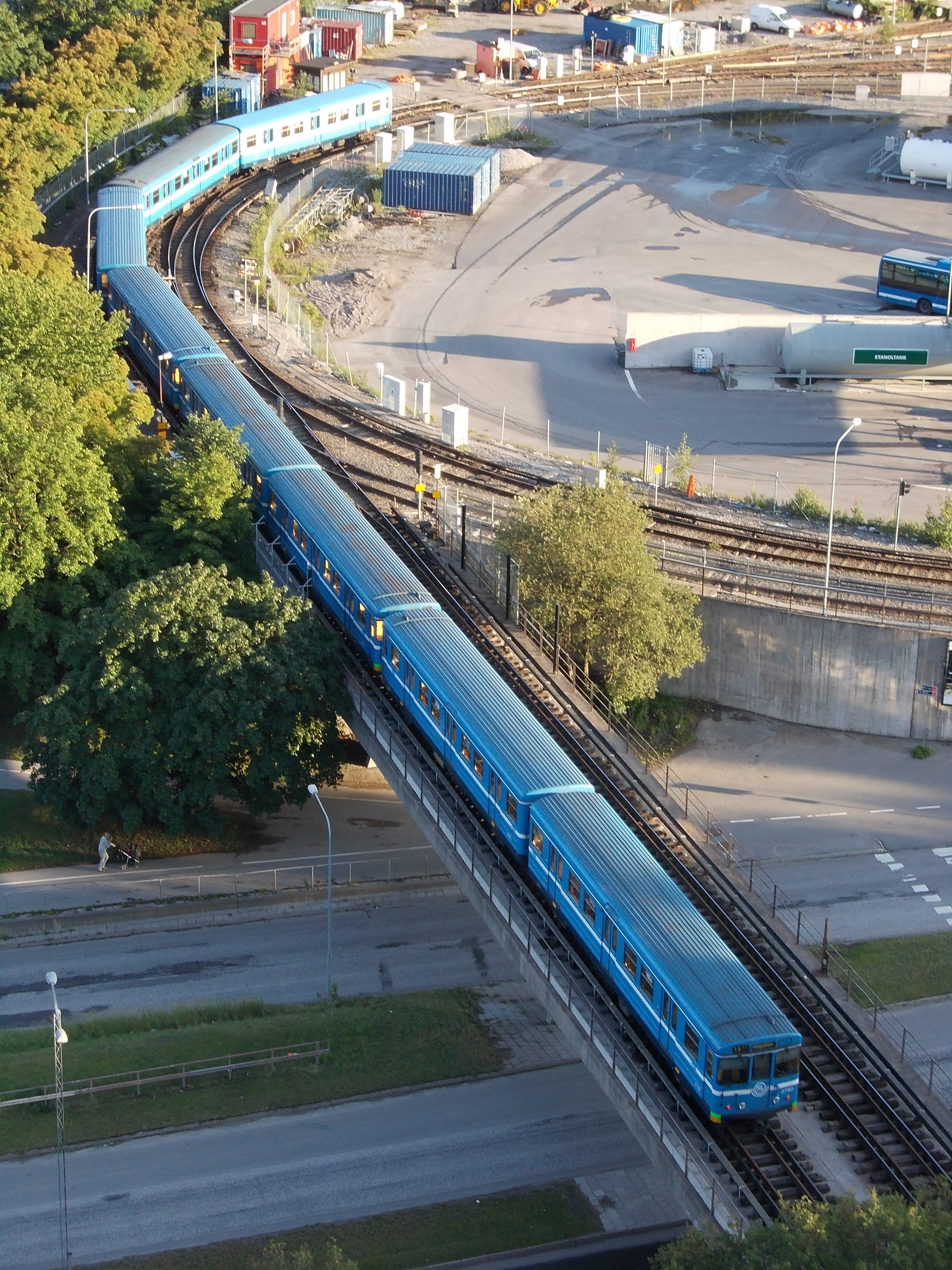
A train on the way between Liljeholmen metro station and Nyboda depot

=== Safety and technology ===
The Stockholm Metro runs electrically using a third rail with a nominal operating voltage of 650 V DC on lines 13, 14, 17, 18 and 19; and 750 V DC on lines 10 and 11. Traffic on the Metro operates on left-hand side, similarly to mainline trains in Sweden. When the Metro system opened in 1950, cars and trams still drove on the left in Sweden.

The maximum speed is 80 km/h (50 mph) on the Red and Blue lines and 70 km/h (43 mph) on the Green Line (50 km/h (31 mph) at the platforms). Maximum acceleration and deceleration is 0.8 m/s^{2}. The reason for the lower speed limit on the Green Line is due to tighter curves than on the other lines, because the Green Line was built by cut and cover under streets in the inner city, while the other lines are bored at greater depth. Two safety systems exist on the Metro: the older system manufactured by Union Switch & Signal in use on the Red and Blue lines and a modern automatic train operation (ATO) system in use on the Green Line manufactured by Siemens Mobility.

To allow close-running trains with a high level of safety, the Metro uses a continuous signal safety system that sends information continually to the train's safety system. The signal is picked up from the rail tracks through two antennas placed in front of the first wheel axle and compared with data about the train's speed. Automatic braking is triggered if the train exceeds the maximum permitted speed at any time. The driver is given information about the speed limit through a display in the driver's cabin; in C20 stock, and in Cx stock outfitted for operation with the new signal system installed on the Green Line, this is a speedometer with a red maximum speed indicator (needle), while the traditional display in the Cx stock is a set of three lights indicating one of three permitted speeds (high, medium, low). The system allows two trains to come close to each other but prevents collisions occurring at speeds greater than 15 km/h (9.3 mph). More modern systems also ensure that stop signals are not passed.

Another possibility is automatic train operation, which helps the driver by driving the train automatically. However, the driver still operates the door controls and allows the train to start. As of 2026, ATO is only available on the Green Line, where a new signal system was installed in the late-1990s. This signal system, together with the C20 rolling stock, permits the use of ATO. The signalling system on the Red Line was supposed to be replaced with a Communications-based train control (CBTC) system manufactured by Ansaldo STS under a contract awarded by SL in 2010, however SL cancelled said contract in 2017, reportedly after repeated delays in project implementation.

=== Graffiti ===
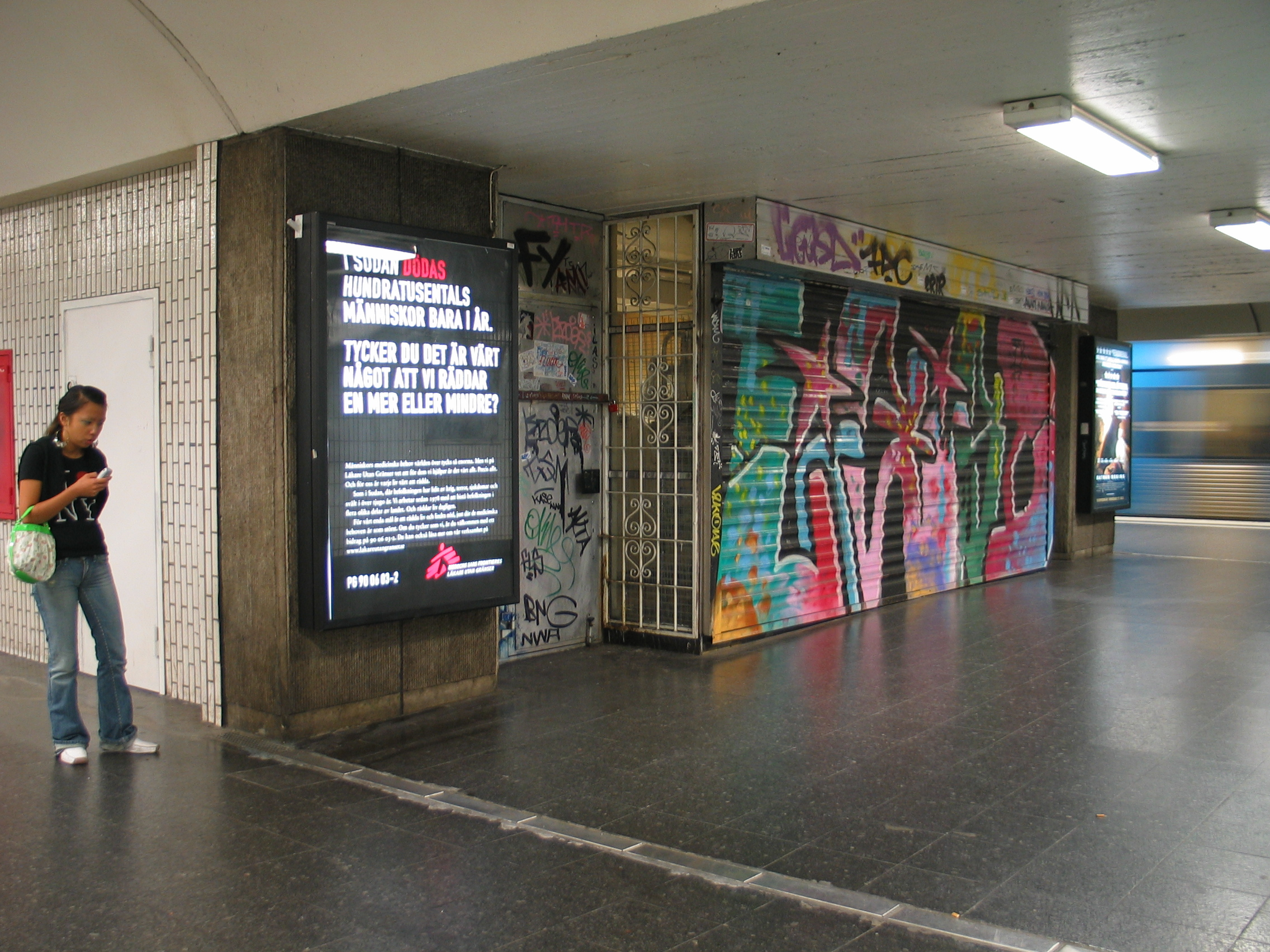
Graffiti at the Karlaplan station, 2005

SL and the Stockholm Metro have zero-tolerance policies for graffiti, with graffiti-covered trains immediately removed from service and station graffiti cleaned within 24 hours. From the mid-1980s, graffiti has been a recurring issue in the Stockholm Metro. Previously, graffiti on trains and stations often remained visible for weeks or months.

In 2018, graffiti damage was reported over an area of 166,475 square meters, equivalent to 30 football fields. Costs for addressing graffiti and vandalism reached 192 million SEK in 2020 (approx. €18 million), driven in part by large-scale repairs like replacing damaged windows.

In December 2019, several prolific graffiti offenders, referred to as "storklottrare," were arrested. In 2022, they were convicted for extensive vandalism committed in 2018 and 2019. Two received prison sentences of 1 and 1.5 years, while a third was given a conditional sentence and fines. They were collectively ordered to pay nearly 2 million SEK (approx. €190,000) in damages. These legal actions were credited with deterring further graffiti activity.

SL also introduced new measures, including fencing, radar-equipped surveillance cameras, and rapid cleaning protocols. By 2022, reported graffiti damage had decreased by 57% compared to 2018, totalling 72,904 square meters (13.5 football fields). Costs dropped to 119 million SEK in 2022 (approx. €11 million), with the Metro seeing the largest improvement.

== Art and popular culture ==
=== Art ===
The Stockholm Metro is often described as the "world's longest art gallery," and is famous for the public art integrated into 94 of its 100 stations, including sculptures, rock formations, mosaics, paintings, light installations, engravings, and reliefs created by over 150 artists. Beyond aesthetics, Region Stockholm believes that art at the stations contributes to a calm and safe environment and reduces vandalism and graffiti, and that travellers find it easier to orient themselves when each station has its own identity.

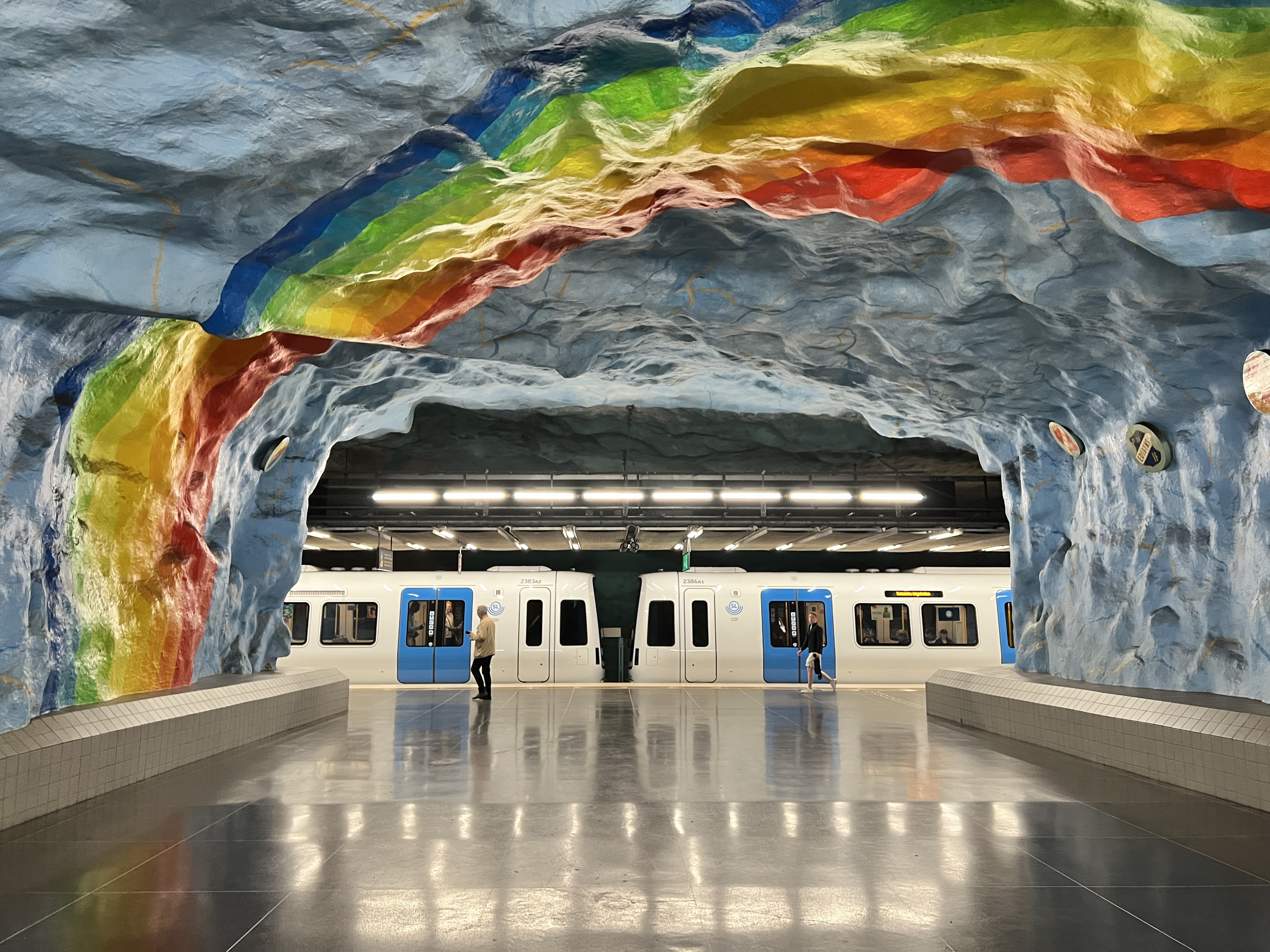
Stadion station (built in 1973), an example of bedrock art in Stockholm Metro

Advocacy for art on the Metro was driven by artists Vera Nilsson and Siri Derkert, who faced resistance from officials and politicians who questioned its relevance and cost. However, by 1957, Stockholm City Council had approved the integration of art into the Metro, and established a program to commission works for new stations, starting with T-Centralen.

The first major art installations in the Stockholm Metro appeared in the 1960s, with Siri Derkert's 1965 work at Östermalmstorg Station, featuring sandblasted engravings focused on feminism, world peace, and environmentalism. These early installations often reflected modernist aesthetics and social commentary. In the 1970s, as the Metro expanded, including with the opening of the Blue Line, large-scale, immersive artworks became common. Artists collaborated closely with architects, as seen at Solna Centrum (1975), where Anders Åberg and Karl-Olov Björk created a red and green cave-like design addressing urbanisation and environmental issues. In the 1980s and 1990s, the art program diversified, with stations like Kungsträdgården (designed by Ulrik Samuelson) incorporating historical motifs and archaeological elements. At Rissne, a fresco about the history of Earth's civilisations runs along both sides of the platform.

Some installations have sparked debate. In 2017, Liv Strömquist's temporary exhibition The Night Garden at Slussen station featured sketches depicting subjects such as menstruation. While some praised the work for addressing taboos, others criticised it as inappropriate for a public setting. SL defended the work as part of its commitment to diverse artistic expressions.

Art projects continue to be an integral part all new station designs. Since 2015, public competitions have been held to select artists for new stations on the Blue and Green lines. These new works are developed in close collaboration with architects and engineers, and often respond to the specific context of each station, reflecting local history, culture, or natural surroundings. For example at Barkarbystaden station, Helena Byström's work incorporates dynamic video art that references the area's military aviation history.

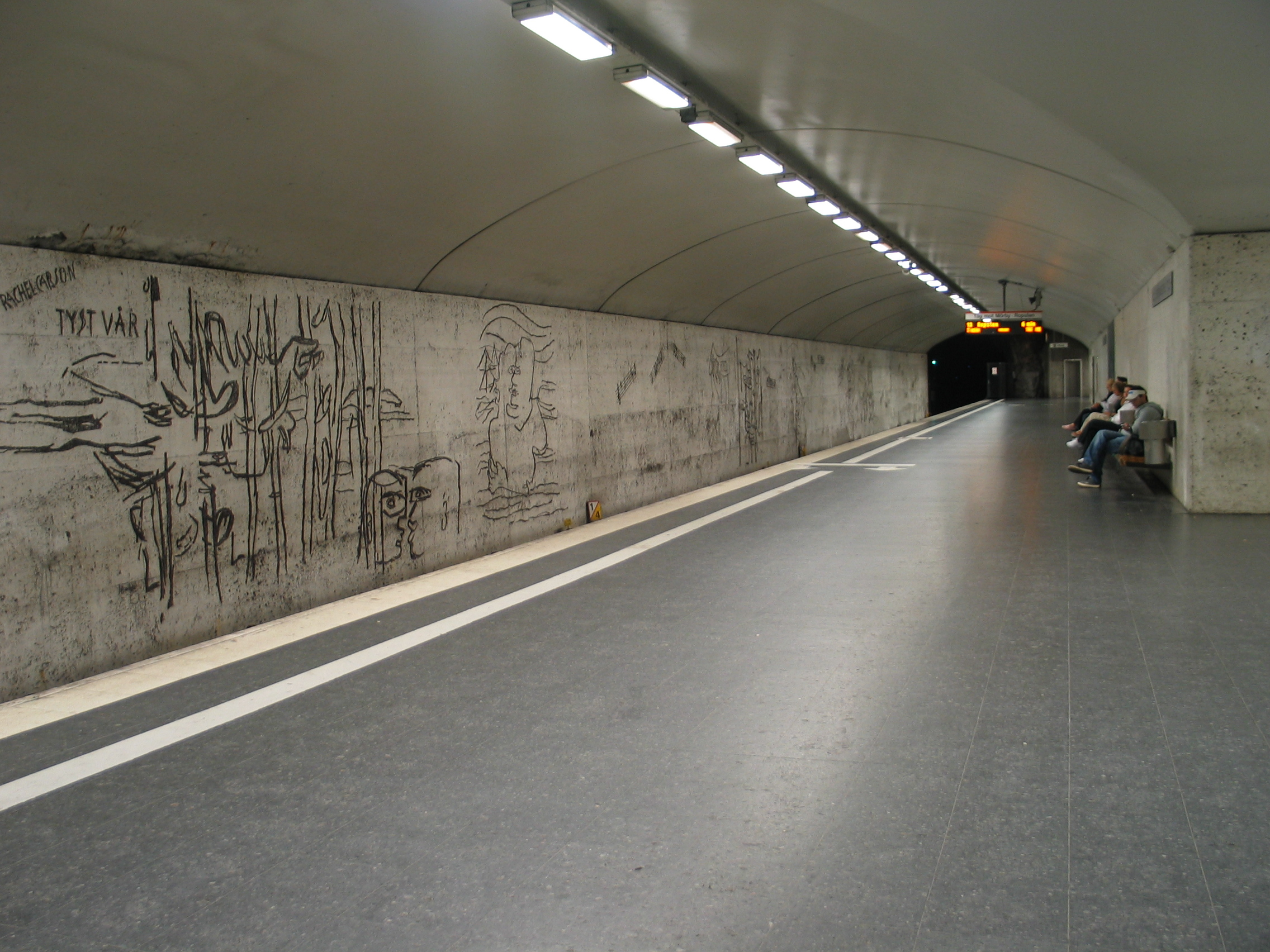
Östermalmstorg

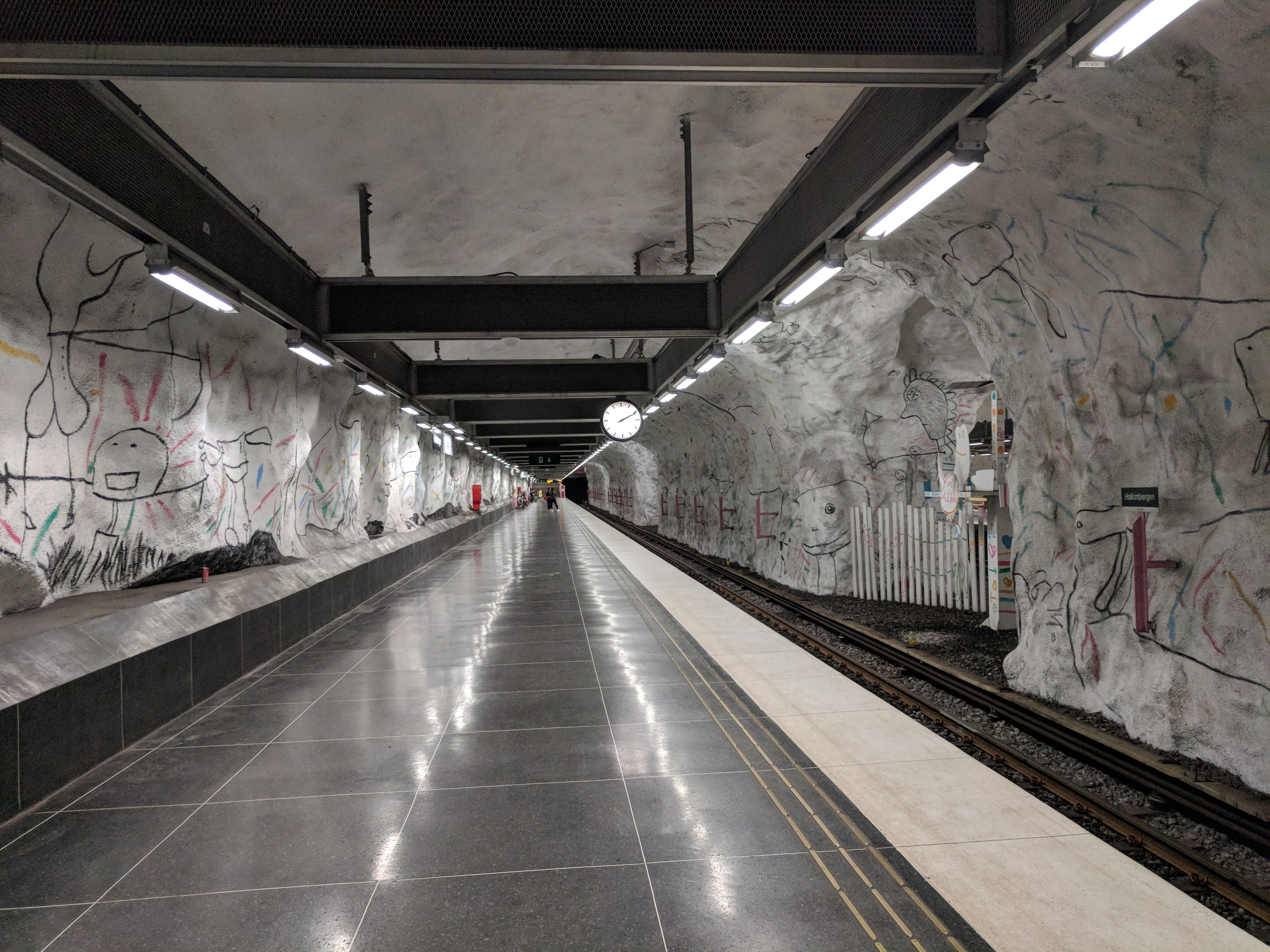
Hallonbergen

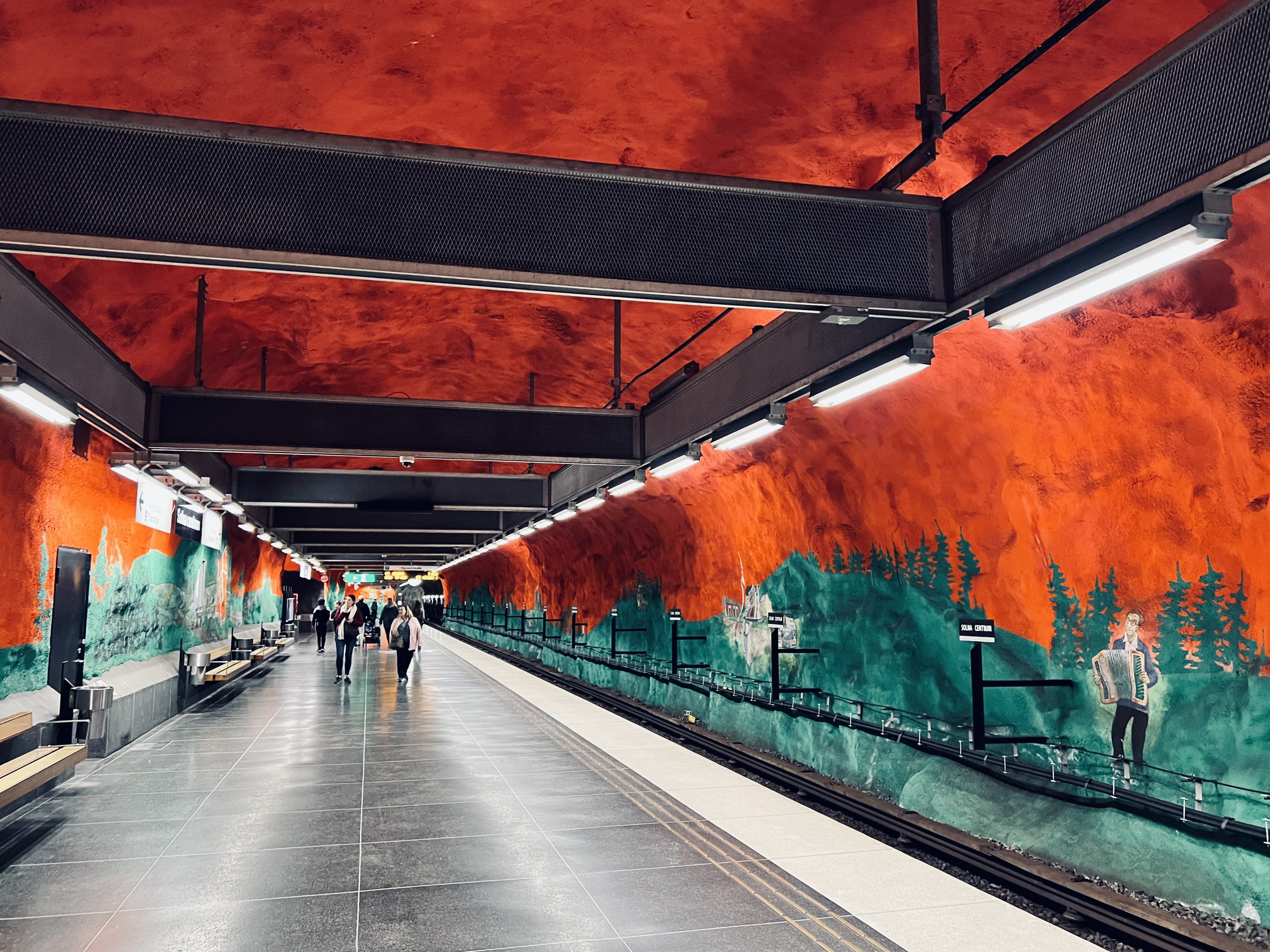
Solna centrum

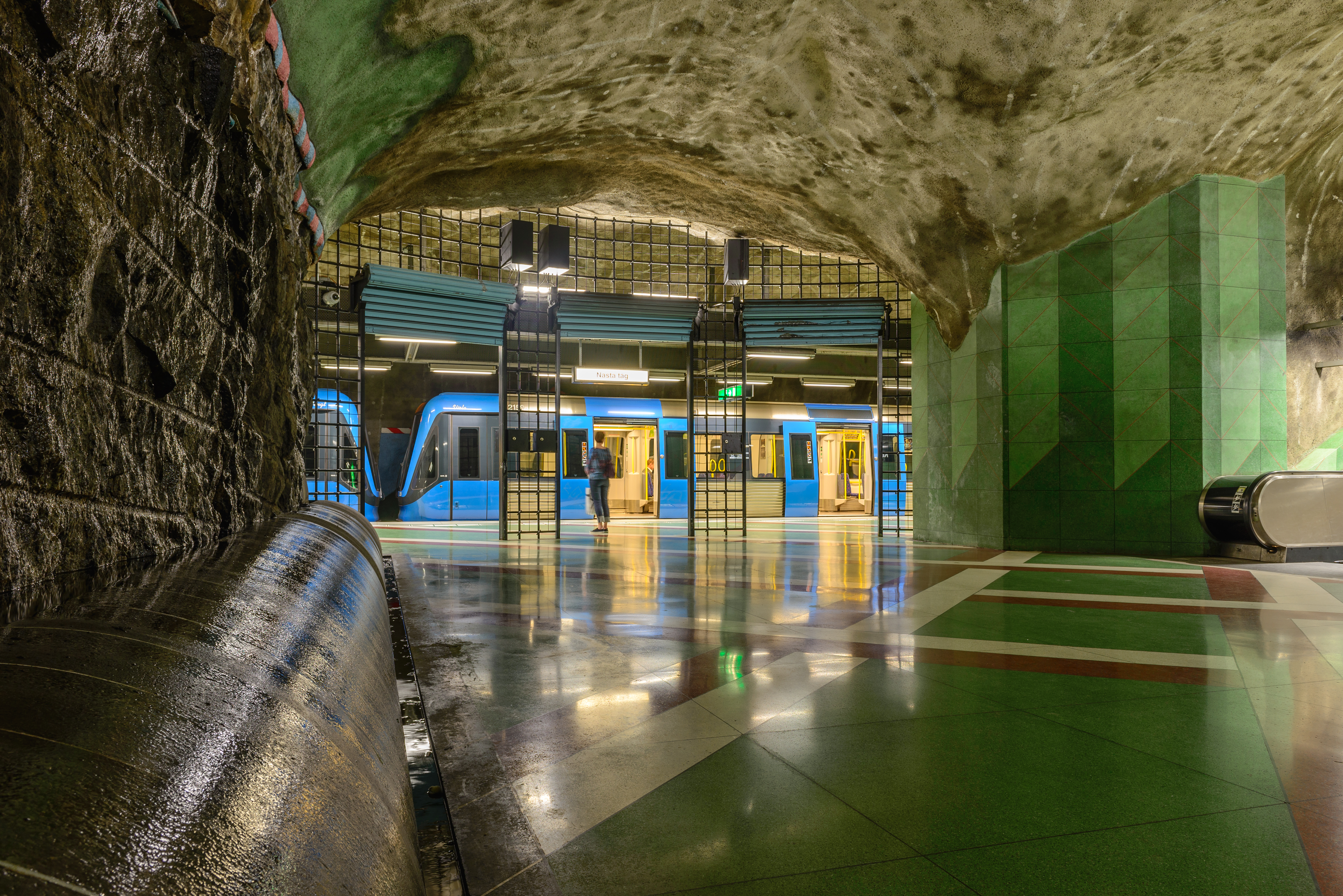
Kungsträdgården

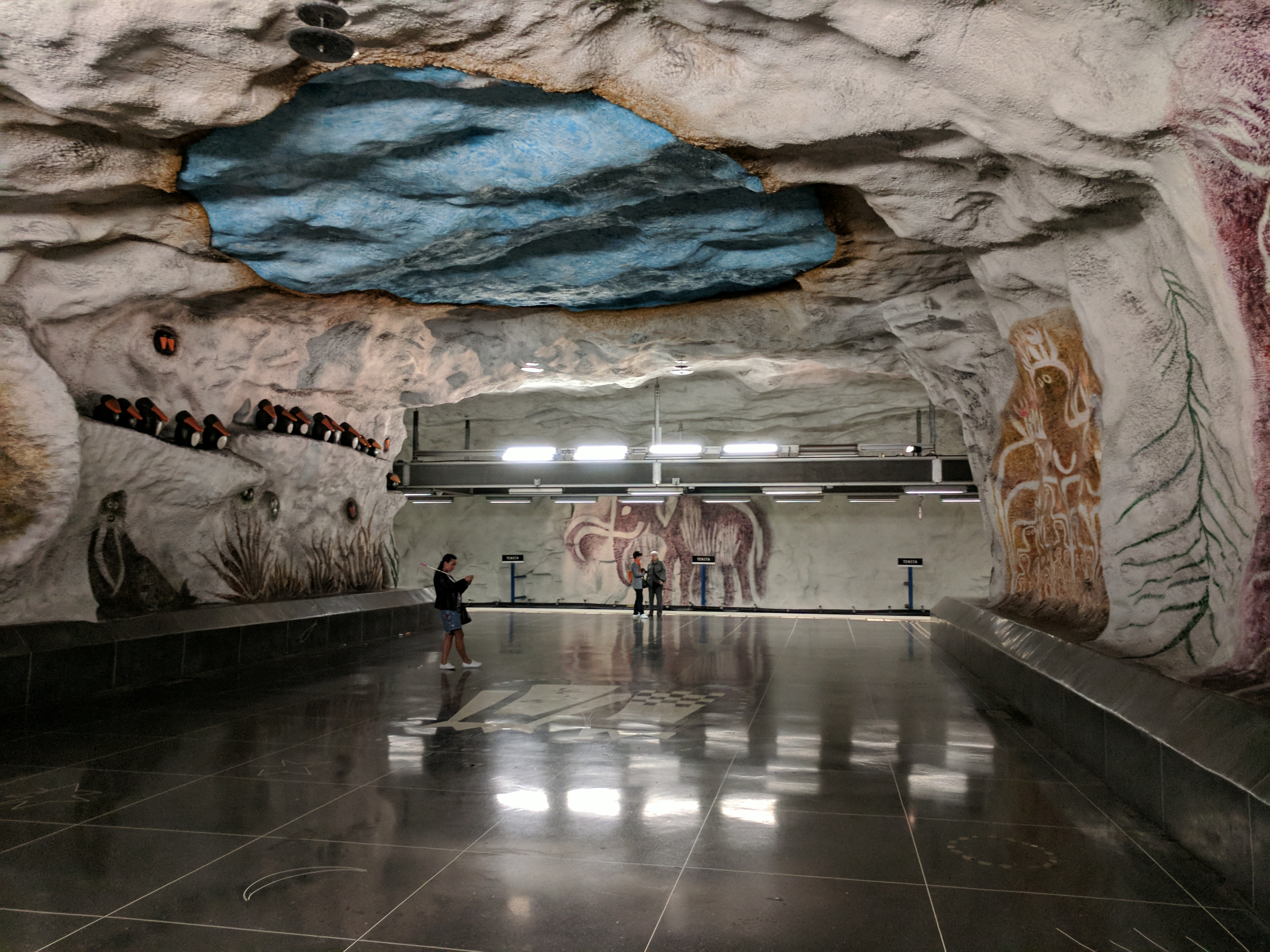
Tensta

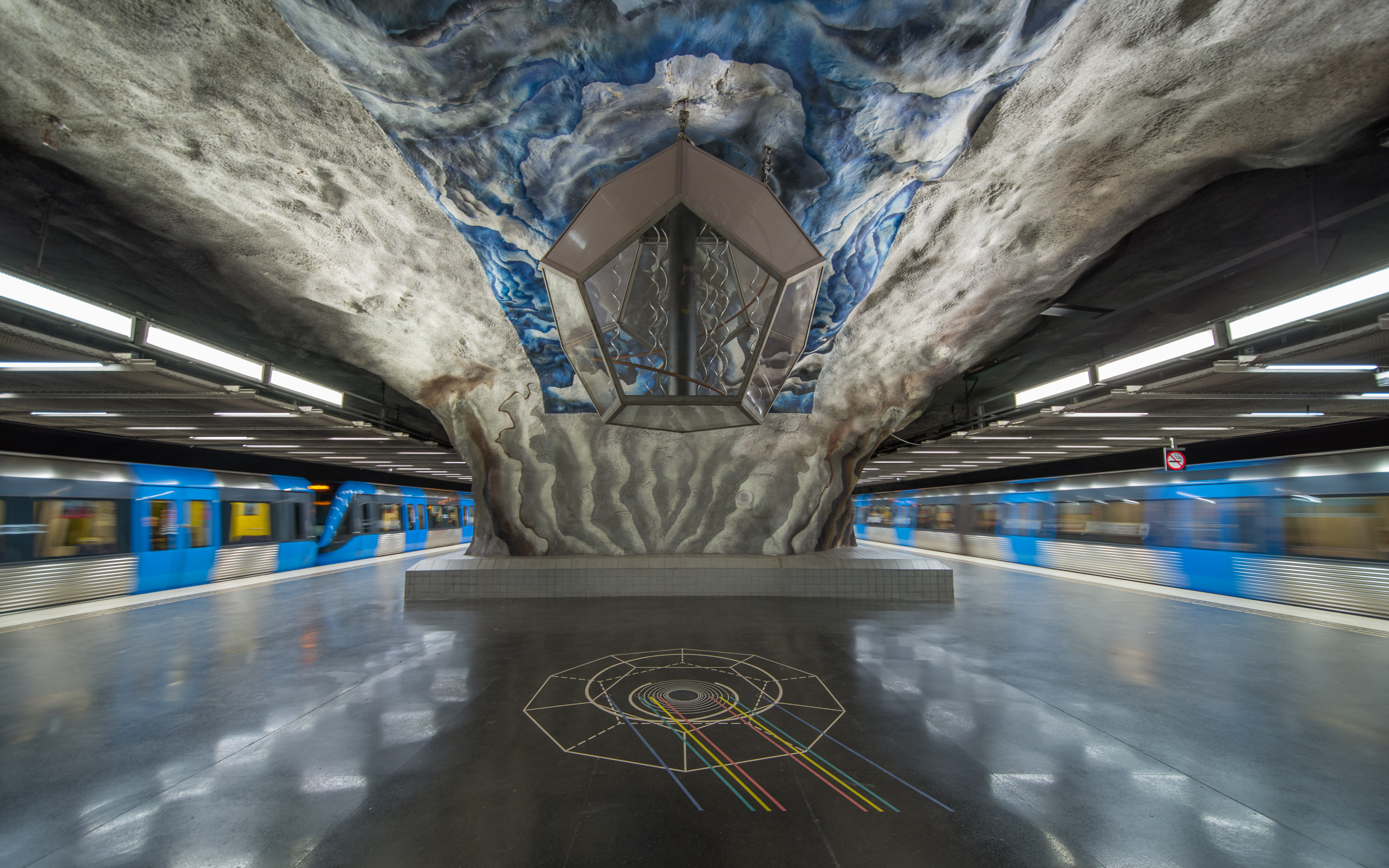
Tekniska högskolan

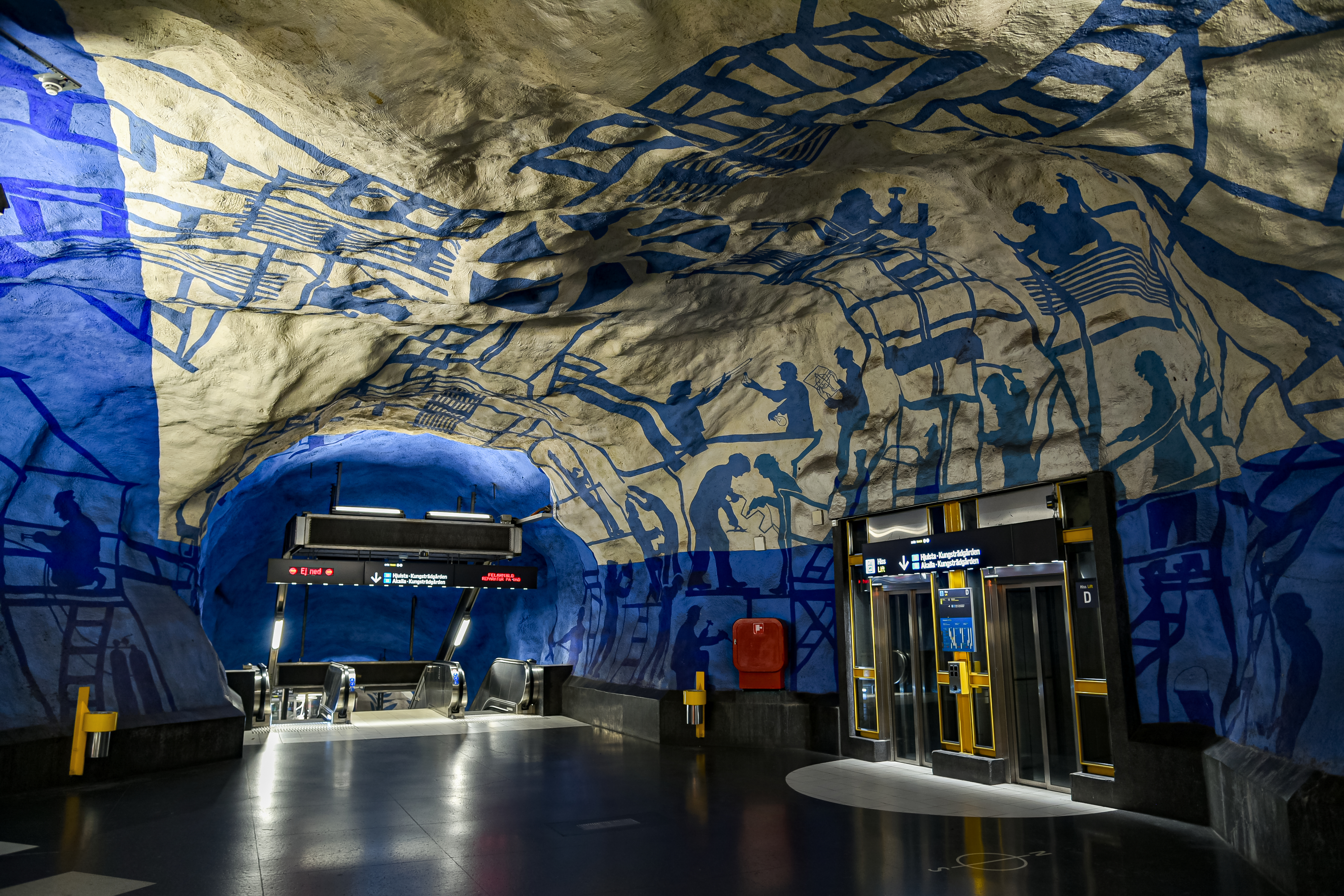
T-Centralen (Blue line)

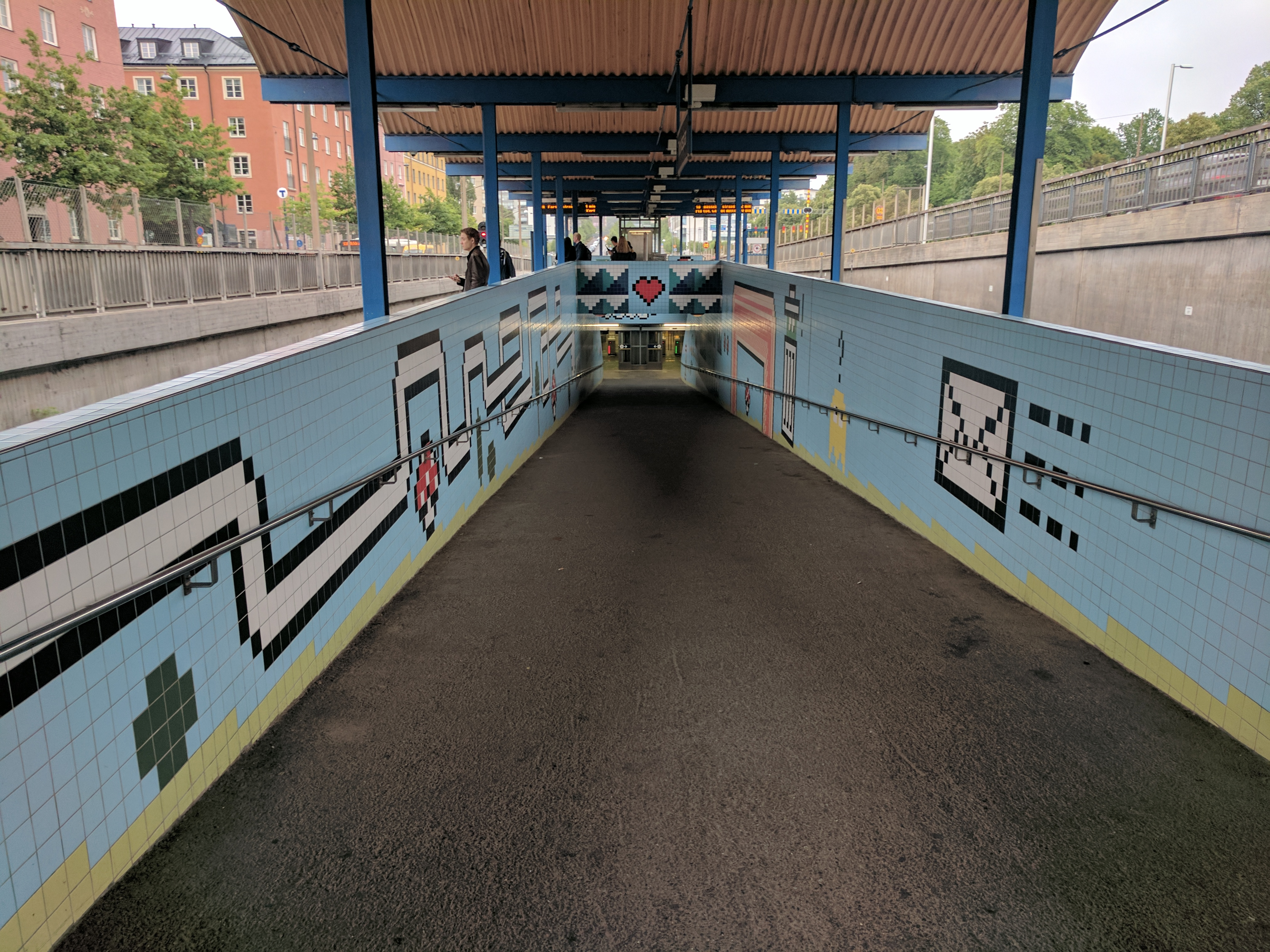
Thorildsplan

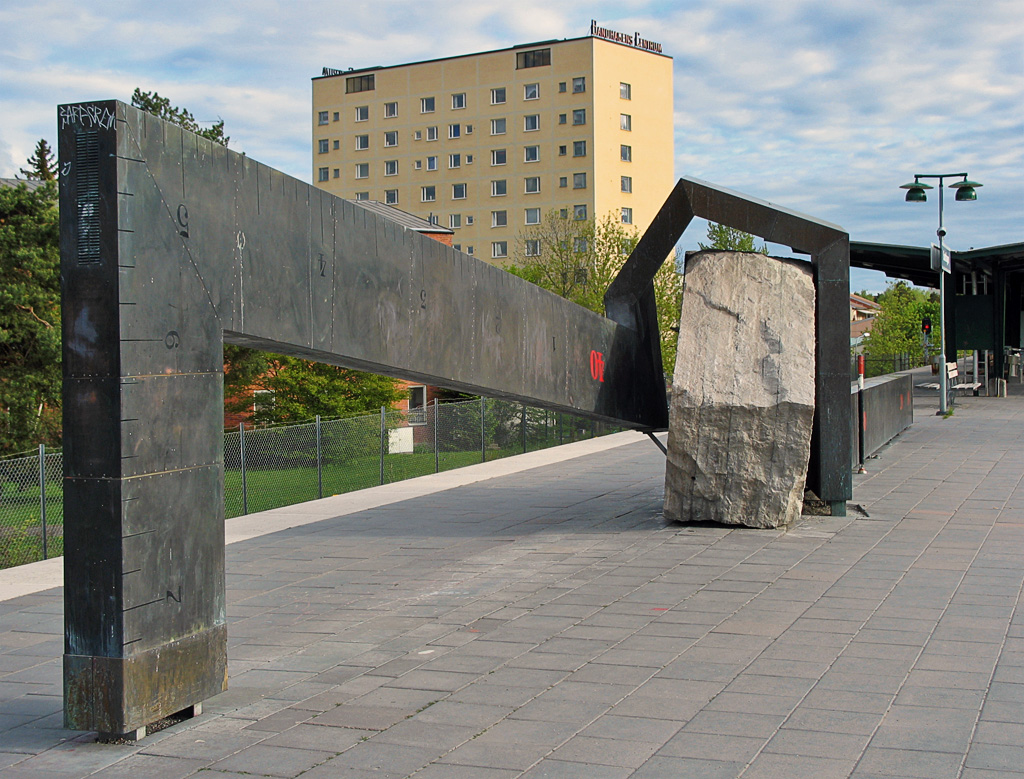
Bandhagen

=== Urban legends ===
The modern Metro network, which was inaugurated in 1950, has racked up several mythical urban legends over the years, notably involving ghost phenomena, especially of the horror genre. The most famous of these is the legend of the Silver Train (Swedish: Silvertåget), a silver colored ghost train that traffics the Stockholm Metro and carries dead people to the afterlife. The legend is said to originate from the C5-cars, an aluminium prototype Metro train which never received paint and usually ran at night. The C5 carries the nickname of "the Silver Arrow" (Silverpilen), which has since carried over to the ghost train.

Another notable urban legend, especially in connection with the Silver Train, surrounds the unfinished Kymlinge metro station, which was built but never taken into service. The legend says no living get off at Kymlinge, only the dead. This is usually combined with the legend of the Silver Train, which is said to only stop at Kymlinge.

== Future ==
=== Current expansions ===
In 2013, it was announced that agreement had been reached on the future of several extensions. Preliminary planning started in 2016 and revenue service on the first sections is projected to begin in the mid 2020s. In 2017, another agreement was reached regarding several public transportation projects in Stockholm, including a fourth Metro line. The extensions, which are the first in more than 30 years, will add 18 new Metro stations making the total number of stations 113. (Note: There are currently 100 stations. Globen and Enskede Gård will be closed and replaced by a new station, Slakthusområdet. One new underground station for the Blue Line will be built alongside Gullmarsplan station above. Two new stations will be added at Fridhemsplan and Liljeholmen on the Yellow Line. Additionally, there will be 14 new standalone stations, resulting in a total of 18 new stations and 113 stations overall.) It is the policy of the Stockholm Metro that all new extensions and lines are built underground. Altogether, this amounts to the following new constructions:

==== Blue Line to Nacka and Hagsätra ====
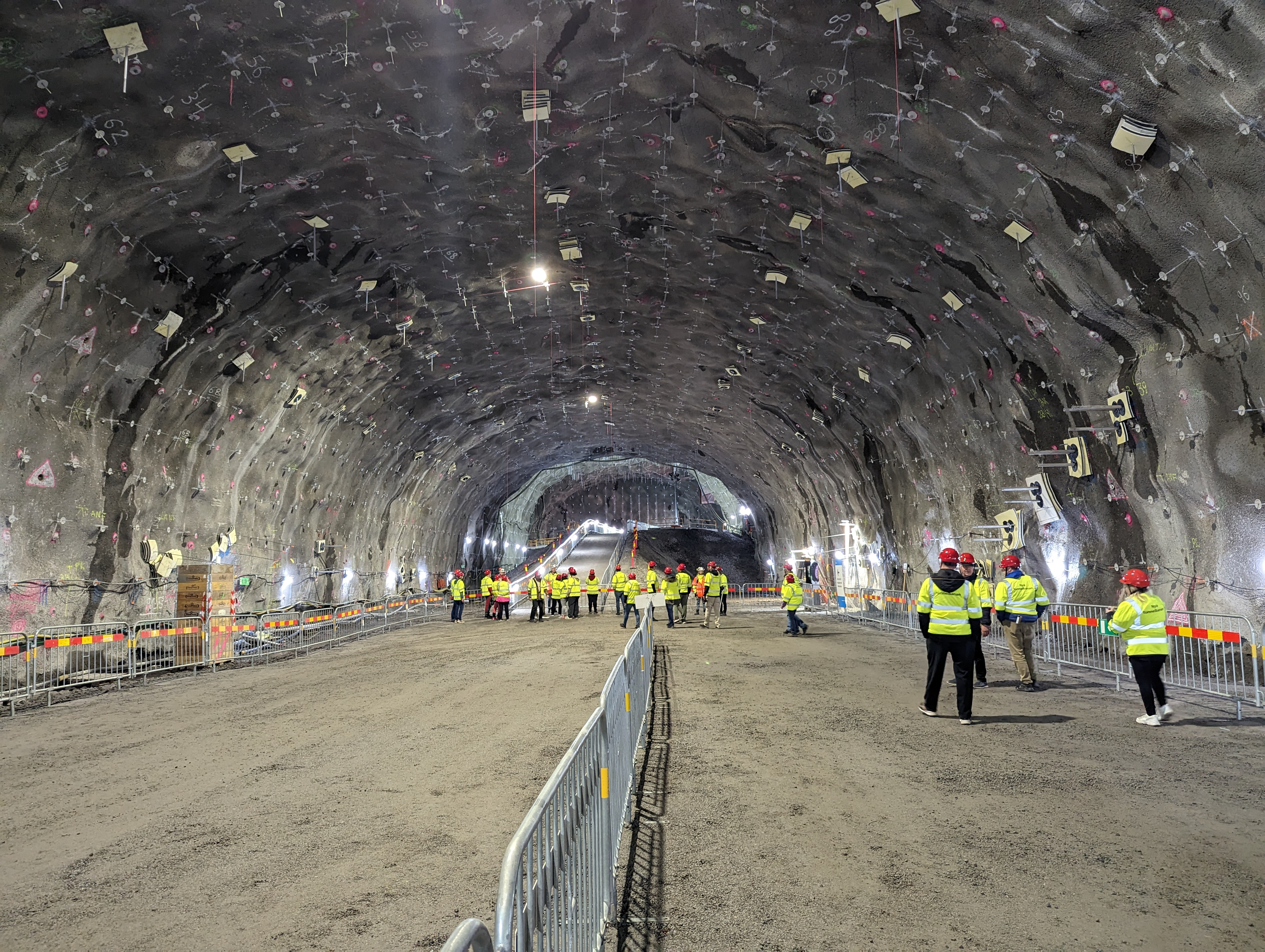
Blue Line under construction at Barkarby in 2023

Continuing south from Kungsträdgården, there will be a new Sofia station at Södermalm, after which the line will split, with one branch continuing to Nacka (with a transfer to Saltsjöbanan and three new intermediate stations: Hammarby kanal, Sickla and Järla), and the other to new underground platforms at Gullmarsplan after which it will take over the current Green Line branch to Hagsätra. The surface-level stations Globen and Enskede gård on the Hagsätra branch will be closed and replaced by a new underground station, Slakthusområdet. This will allow higher frequencies on the Green Line branches to Farsta strand and Skarpnäck, which are currently limited by the fact that three branches converge in a bottleneck at T-Centralen. Both the branch to Nacka and the transfer of the Gullmarsplan—Hägsatra from the Green Line to the Blue line are set to commence in 2032, while the northern termini of the branches have not been decided yet.

==== Blue Line to Barkarby railway station ====
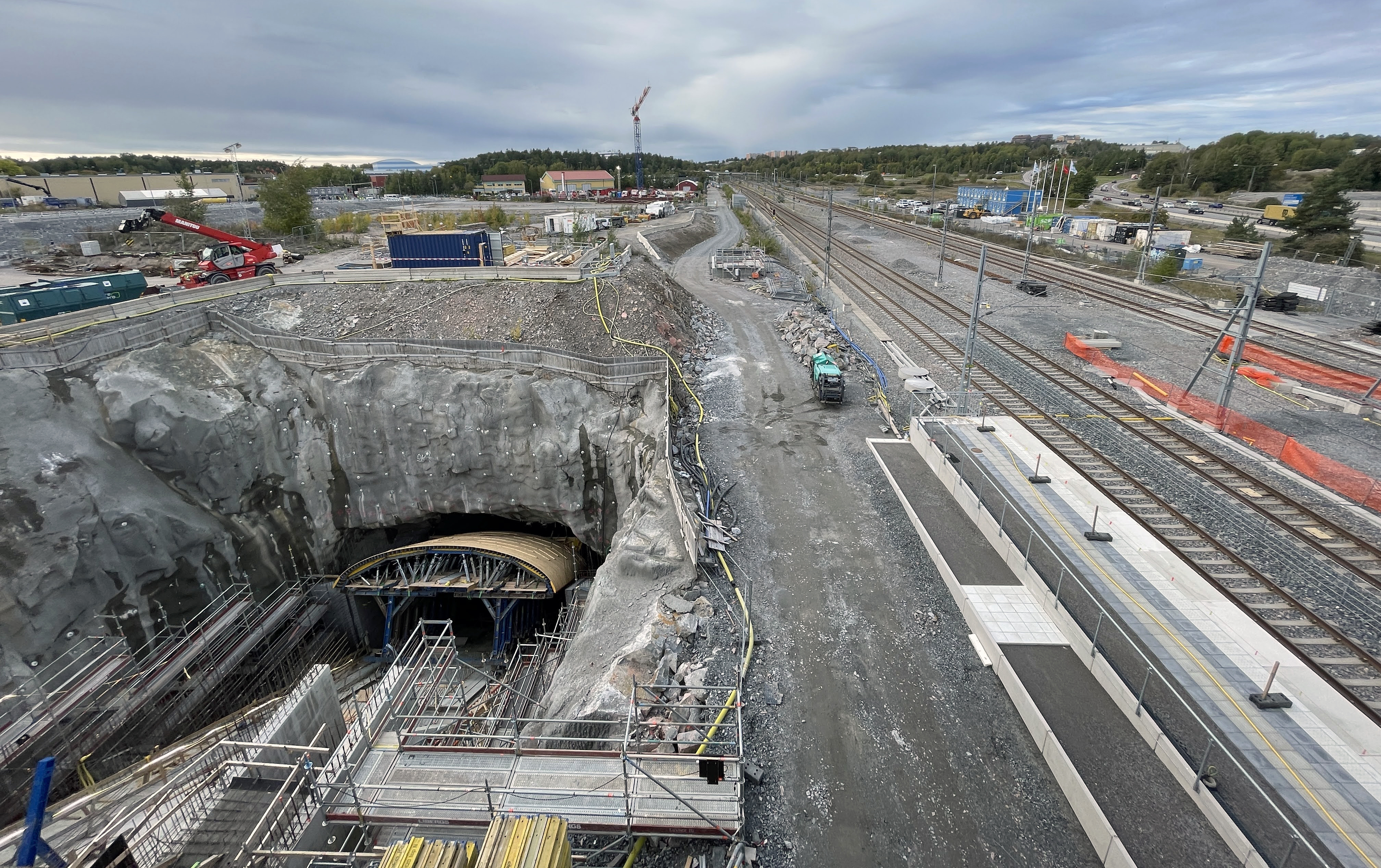
Barkarby metro station entrance under construction in 2024

An extension of the Blue Line north-west from Akalla to Barkarby railway station (with a transfer to Pendeltåg commuter rails) via Barkarbystaden, a new residential development on the former site of Barkarby Airport, is under active counstruction and is set to open in 2028.

==== Green Line to Arenastaden ====
This new segment is planned to run from Odenplan with intermediate stations at Hagastaden and Södra Hagalund in Solna municipality, terminating at Arenastaden (roughly around the vicinity of the Strawberry Arena and Westfield Mall of Scandinavia). The construction is expected to finish in 2029. The segment was originally referred to as the Yellow Line after a competition was held by Stockholm City Council in 2014, but was redesignated as a new branch of the Green Line in May 2023 and the Yellow Line designation was subsequently only used to refer to the below-mentioned Fridhemsplan—Älvsjö Metro line.

==== New depot ====
To support the expansion of the Stockholm Metro, the Högdalen depot is being extended with new underground staging areas to service trains on both the Blue and Green lines. A new underground connection will link the depot to the Green Line's Farsta branch.

=== Confirmed expansions ===
==== Yellow Line ====
A new, automated Yellow line (name since 2023) running between Fridhemsplan and Älvsjö via Liljeholmen, Årstaberg, Årstafältet and Östbergahöjden (has been renamed since there is already a station at Roslagsbanan called Östberga) is planned to open in 2037, with construction having started in 2025.

=== Expansions under investigation ===
==== Line to Bromma Airport area ====
An investigation is underway into the potential extension of either the Blue Line or Green Line to a new district replacing the current Stockholm Bromma Airport, which is scheduled to close before 2038. A consultation is scheduled for autumn 2025 to gather public input, and the investigation will result in a report with proposed routes, set to be completed by late 2026. While no political decision has been made, if approved, construction could start around 2035, with the line potentially operational by 2045.

== See also ==
- The Silver Train of Stockholm
- List of metro systems
- Malmö Metro (proposed)
