= The Silver Train of Stockholm =

Ghost train urban legend

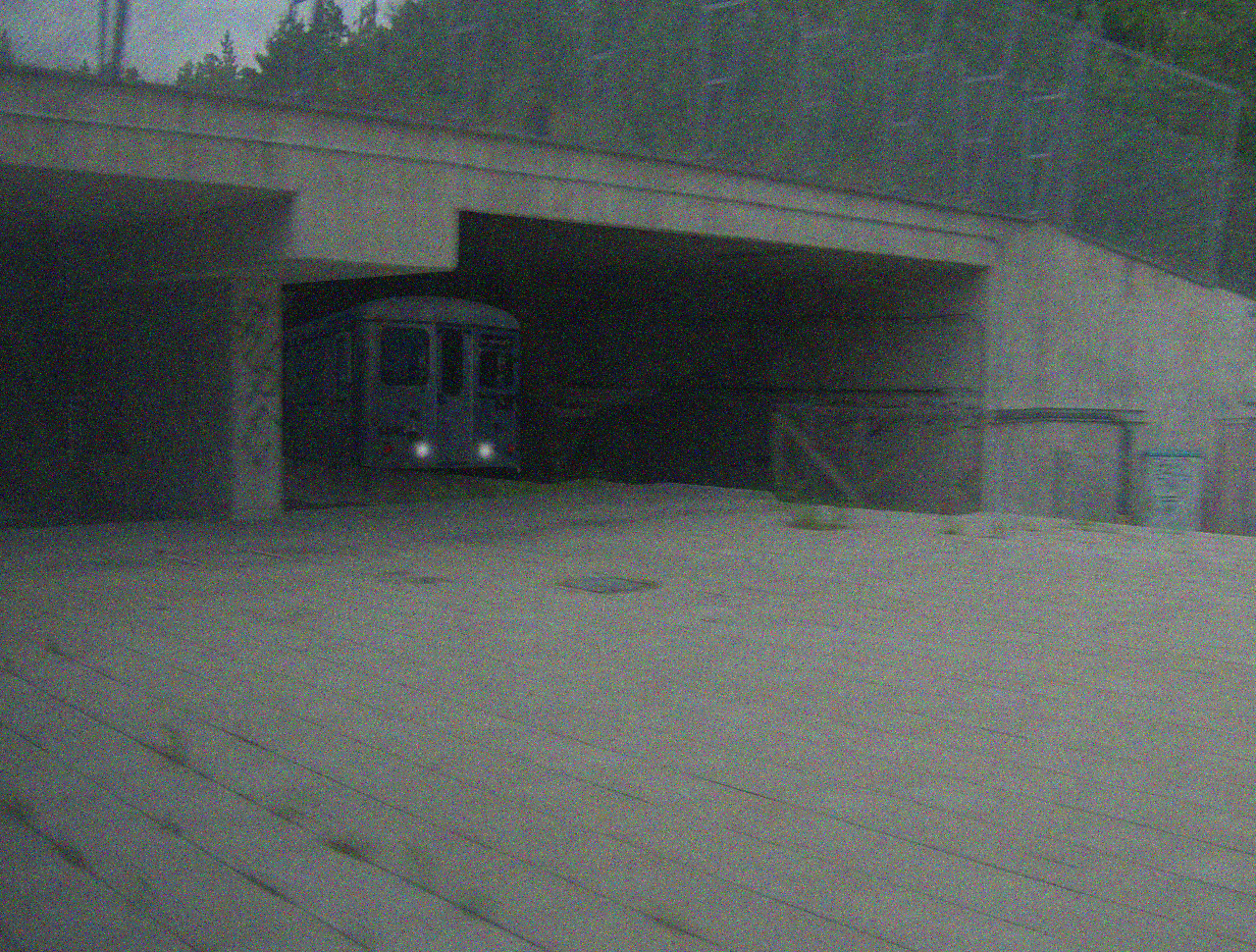
Artist's impression of the Silver Train at Kymlinge ghost station.

The Silver Train (Swedish: Silvertåget), also known as the Silver Arrow (Swedish: Silverpilen), is an urban legend about a silver-colored ghost train that traffics the Stockholm Metro. The legend is one of several surrounding the Stockholm Metro involving ghost phenomena. The modern railway network, which was inaugurated in 1950, has racked up several mythical urban legends over the years, especially of the horror genre, of which the silver train is the most famous.

According to ethnologist Bengt af Klintberg, there is a legend where the train must have had some kind of curse on the living, as those who got on the train could not get off. This curse is retold in various urban legends and ghost stories about the silver train and has even been turned into a TV-episode in the year 2000 for the Swedish horror themed television show Spökafton, as well as a children's book in 2016 under the name Spöktåget Silverpilen ("The ghost train The Silver Arrow") in the book series Mystiska Myter ("Mysterious Myths"), written by Swedish author Anna Hansson.

== Legend ==
The silver train is said to be an older model silver-colored metro train that operates late at night when conventional metro trains have stopped running (i.e. around 3 am), at what is usually called "the ghost hour" or "the hour of death". According to the legends, the train is alleged to be a train for the dead and only appears to some passengers in the metro. Anyone who dares to get on the train is said to end up in the underworld and never come back. When the doors close, the traveler is supposedly stranded and embarks on a one-way journey to the realm of the dead. Another variation says that the train never stops and continues forever. In addition to the silver color, the train is also characterized by the fact that its passengers (the deceased) have expressionless, dead eyes. According to some variants, a train filled with deceased passengers means that the victim will survive and be released. If the train is empty, it means that the train is there to pick up the victim, causing that one's face to become blank and to stop responding to relatives.

=== SL C5 ===
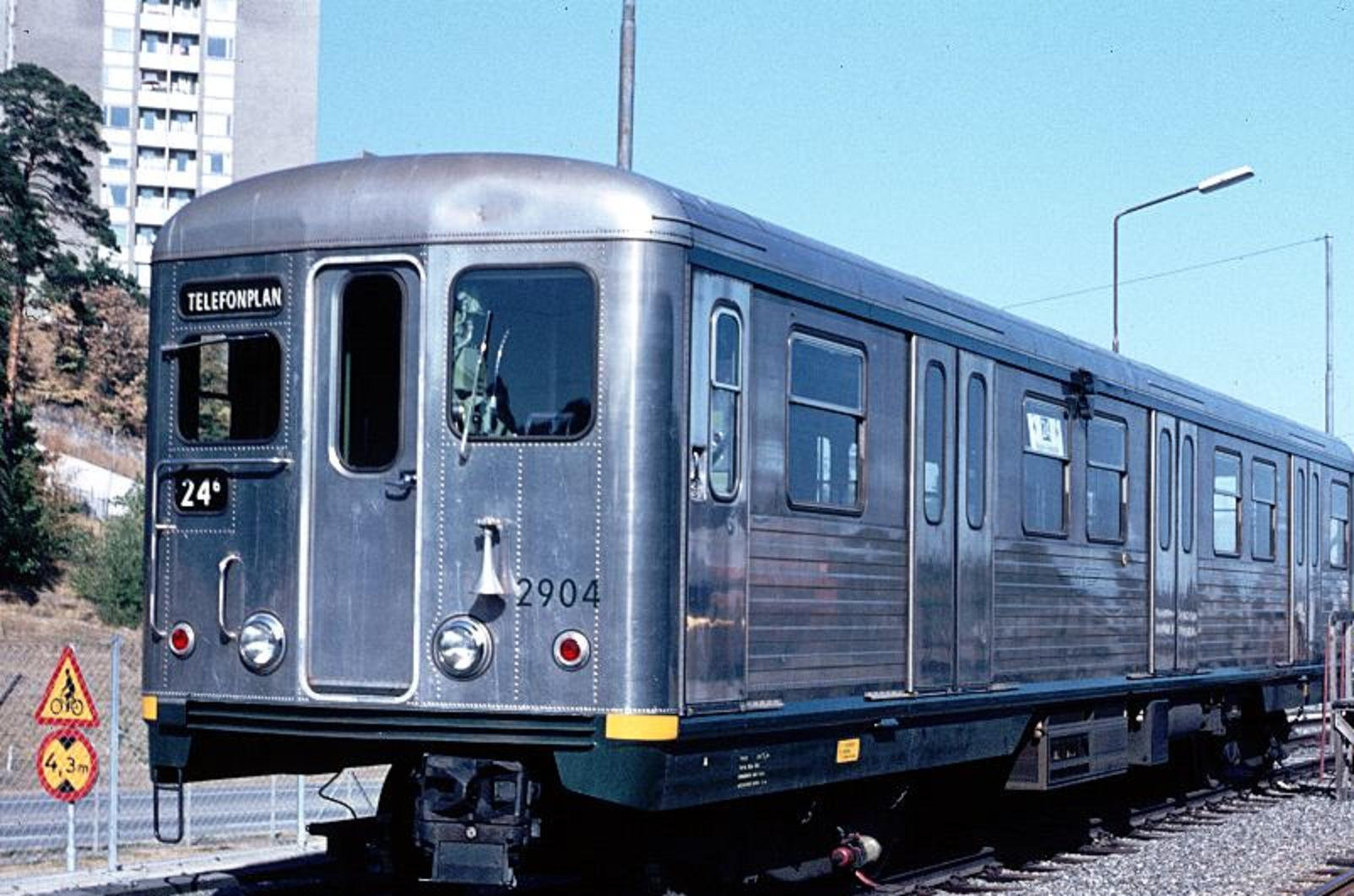
SL C5 at Telefonplan

The silver train is said to be based on the SL C5 metro train, an aluminium prototype metro train from the 1960s that was only produced in one copy (eight cars) and never painted, hence its silver color. These legends probably arose as the C5 cars were considered to have a ghost-like sound in the tunnels and were rare in traffic, then mainly in traffic during the night. In connection with the ghost train, the C5 has also received the nickname "the Silver Arrow" in popular culture.

== Kymlinge ghost station ==
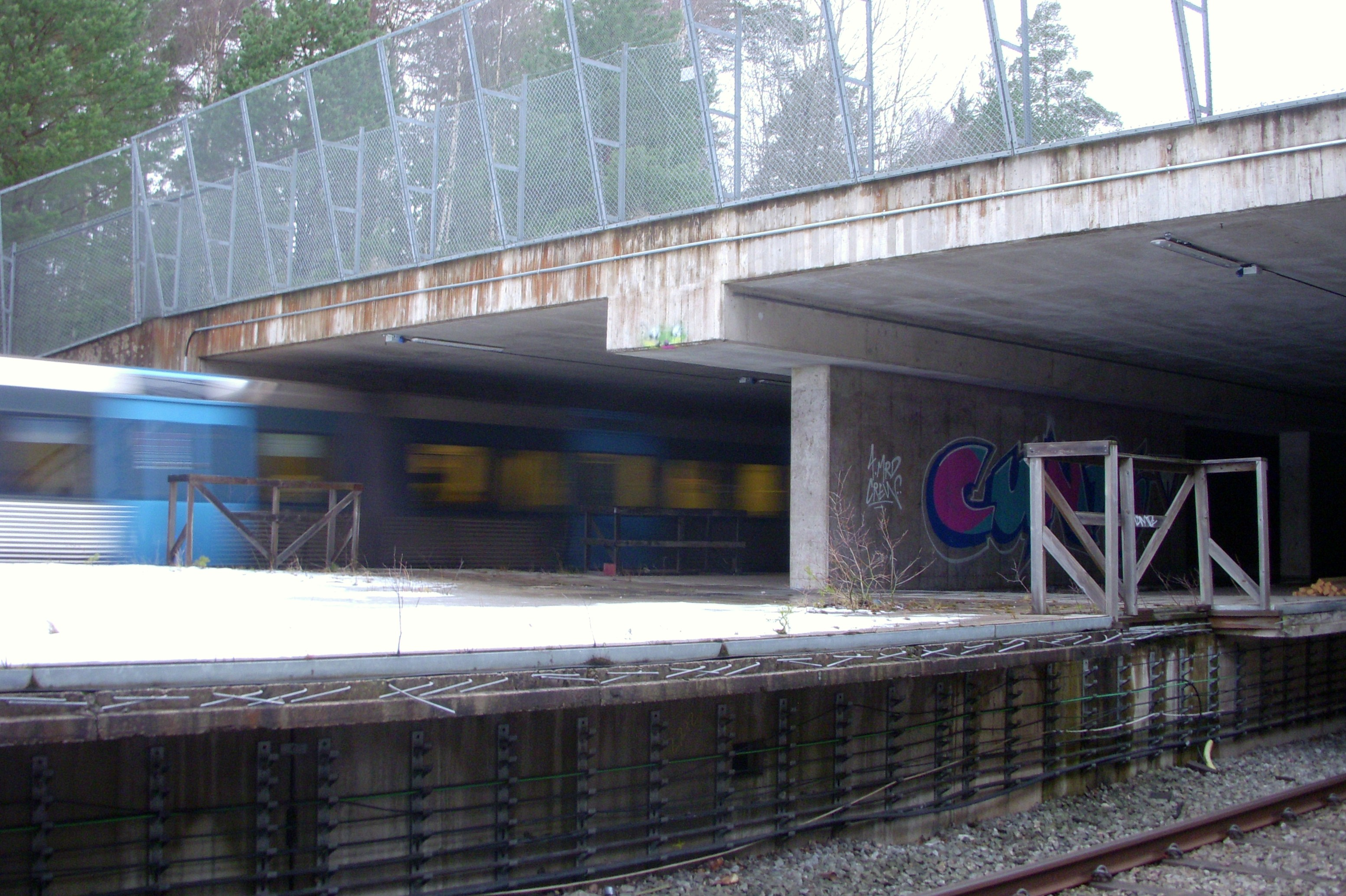
Kymlinge ghost station.

In connection with legends about the silver train, the legend about Kymlinge metro station is often told, an unfinished metro station on the Blue Line that was never put into service and consists entirely of bare concrete foundations. The station is said to be haunted and has been popularly called "the metro station for the dead" or "the ghost station where only the dead get off", colloquially simply the "station of the dead". Interestingly, the name "Kymlinge" comes from Swedish kummel, meaning cairn, especially burial cairn. According to former director of SL (the Stockholm local transit), Björn Dalborg, Stockholmers have been telling scary stories about "Kymlinge ghost station" for decades.

In one variant of the legend, the silver train is said to have operated on the Blue Line and arrived at Kymlinge station as its final destination, where all the dead were supposedly dropped off. However, the C5 cars, which are said to be the basis for the myth of the silver train, rarely operated on the Blue Line.

=== The legend of the girl ===
A popularly retold urban legend or ghost story about the silver train and Kymlinge tells the story about a girl who had been to a disco or ditto in central Stockholm and was going to take the metro home. She got on a train but thought the passengers looked a little strange. The girl was supposed to get off at T-Centralen, but the train did not stop even though she pulled the emergency brake – "she had boarded the Silver Arrow". When the train finally stops and she gets off, she sees a sign in front of her: Kymlinge. She walks with her fellow passengers up the stairs where she is met by a locked door, which does not stop her fellow passengers, who continue straight through the door. The legend about the girl has two different endings: one says that a week later the girl was found dead in Ursvik's forests, i.e. in the vicinity of the Kymlinge Station, the other that she was found alive in the same place a week later, but scared out of her wits.
