= Vicente Parra Bordetas =

Spanish physician

Vicente Parra Bordetas (1886 - 1967) was one of the directors of the 'Varsovie' Hospital in Toulouse, created by the Spanish Republicans at the end of the Second World War. He graduated in medicine in 1908 and worked as a rural doctor in the province of Toledo and in Madrid. During the Spanish Civil War, he served in the Republican Guardias de Asalto, and in 1939, when the war ended, he went to France with ‘La Retirada’. Arrested by the Vichy police in 1943, he was interned in the disciplinary camp of Le Vernet Internment Camp (Ariège) and from there he was taken by the Germans to Dachau on the "Ghost Train" in July–August 1944. After the liberation of Dachau, and his time as Director of the ‘Varsovie’ Hospital, he went into exile in Caracas, where he would live until his death in 1967.

== Early life and education ==
Vicente Parra Bordetas was born in 1886, the eldest son of the six children born to Vicente Parra Yusta and Concepción Bordetas López. The family owned a workshop for the manufacture and sale of scales and balances in Madrid. Vicente graduated in medicine in Madrid in 1908 and soon after began working as a doctor in Mora (Toledo).

== Career ==
In 1915 he moved to Lominchar, also in the province of Toledo, and in 1921 he returned to Madrid where he worked for La Equitativa-Fundación Rosillo and collaborated in the hospitals of La Princesa, Buen Suceso, and the Instituto Operatorio del Doctor Rubio, all of which have now disappeared. In 1929, he returned to the province of Toledo, where he was hired as ‘Head Doctor and Municipal Health Inspector’ in Cedillo del Condado, a village in the region of La Sagra.

=== Spanish Civil War 1936-1939 ===
On 27 September 1936, the troops rebelling against the Government of the Spanish Republic advanced without great difficulty towards the capital. Vicente Parra went with his family to Madrid, where he joined the Security Corps (Guardias de Asalto) as a doctor. He was sent to Barcelona as a result of the events of May 1937.

== World War II ==
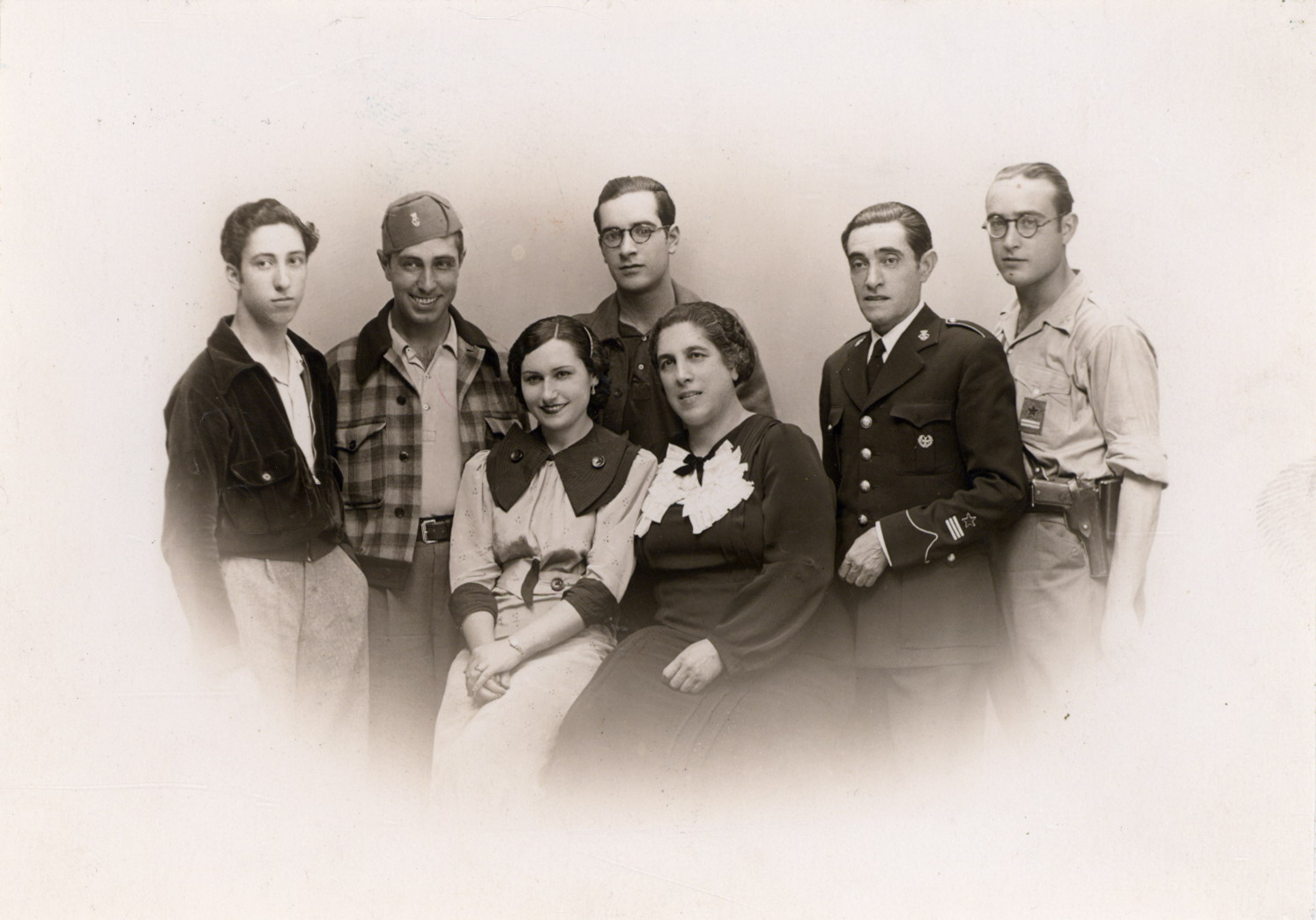
Vicente Parra and his family, Barcelona, July 1937.

=== France: working for GTE and camp in Le Vernet d’Ariège ===
After the fall of Barcelona, on 9 February 1939, Vicente Parra went to France via La Junquera with the Spanish retreat. Health service; after passing through the different internment camps, he was installed, in November 1939, in the camp of Clairfont, where Parra “was in charge of the infirmary”. Clairfont was located in Portet-sur-Garonne (Haute-Garonne).

Parra collaborated actively with the French Resistance, in his case with that promoted by the PCE (Spanish Communist Party); according to a Homologation de Grade F.F.I. file, under the nom de guerre of ‘El Sastre’, he provided medical assistance to members of the Resistance and collaborated in the preparation of explosives. According to Sebastián Agudo Blanco, he was one of the leaders in the area from the very beginning. On 8 January 1943, Vicente Parra was arrested by the Vichy police and imprisoned in the Saint Étienne. On 17 March, he was interned in the Le Vernet camp, some 60 kilometres south of Toulouse. According to the camp archives, the internment order, which was the responsibility of the departmental Prefect, was due to his being ‘identified as a liaison agent between the communist elements in the Clairfont camp and those in Toulouse’. It also states that he was ‘likely to play a leading role [jouer un rôle] in the event of disorder’.

According to a note in the Harvard Divinity School Library archive, Vicente Parra was appointed camp doctor and also acted as a doctor to the inmates of the Saint Michel prison in Toulouse. A report from the Head of the camp to the Prefect of Ariège in September 1943 states that he ‘rendered great services in the hospital’. The Hungarian-born rabbi Georges Vadnai testified to Vicente Parra's stay in Le Vernet.

=== Doctor on board the ‘Ghost Train’ ===
On 9 June 1944, three days after the Allied landings in Normandy, a German army unit arrived at Le Vernet camp and took charge of the prisoners. On the 30th of that month, the transfer of the prisoners to Germany began: 403 inmates from this camp were taken to the Caffarelli barracks in Toulouse, where they were to form the main core of the deportees on the so-called 'Ghost Train' (Train Fantôme). They were joined by others from the aforementioned Saint Michel prison and twenty women from various camps in the region. On 2 July, they set off on the journey, crammed into freight wagons: 70 or 80 in each wagon designed to carry 40. They were guarded by a Waffen-SS company of about 150 men belonging to the Feldgendarmerie. The train passed through Bordeaux and, after attempting to march to Paris via Angoulême, the uncertainty of the route and the harassment by Allied aircraft forced the Germans to turn back to Bordeaux. There, in the former synagogue, the prisoners were held from 9 July to 9 August. During that month, ten of them were shot.

By the time the expedition set out again, 110 men and 40 women from the Bordeaux prison of Fort du Hâ had joined the expedition. The total number of prisoners was now 690. It was not every day that the German soldiers allowed the prisoners to be fed; in most cases it was the Red Cross that did so, and only very sparingly. But the biggest shortages are water, space and ventilation: the small windows of the freight wagons are always closed to try to prevent escapes. Throughout the journey, Vicente Parra and another Spanish doctor, Jean Van Dyck, helped the sick and wounded as much as possible.

The train left Bordeaux on 9 August and headed back to Toulouse and Nîmes to go up the Rhône valley towards Lyon. In Pierrelatte, in the Drôme department, the train was again strafed by Allied aircraft, unaware that it was full of prisoners. In 1990, Hélène Jaume, wife of Gustave Jaume, the Pierrelatte doctor, recalled how Parra helped the wounded and declined to be hidden by them and chose to go back to the train taking care of the prisoners. The convoy finally managed to enter Germany via Saarbrücken on 26 August. On 28 August 536 deportees arrived at the Dachau concentration camp near Munich.

=== Eight months in Dachau ===
At Dachau Vicente Parra was interned in blocks 19 and 21 and returned to work as a doctor to the prisoners in the infirmary, treating those who had been experimented on by the Nazis and some wounded American airmen. In early 1945 a typhus epidemic broke out in the camp, and Parra assisted in the ensuing work. When the camp was liberated by the Americans on 29 April 1945, he represented the Spaniards on the International Prisoners Committee. After liberation, he worked in collaboration with the American authorities until the last of the Spaniards was able to leave the camp. About his stay in Dachau there are some testimonies of former prisoners, like José Artime and Ramón Buj.

=== Director of 'Varsovie' Hospital in Toulouse ===
In June 1945, Dr Parra returned to Toulouse, where his wife and children were staying. He then went to work, for a short time, in a clinical laboratory and was then employed in a hospital that had been set up by the Spanish Republicans as soon as the city was liberated: the so-called Hospital Varsovia (after the street name: Varsovie), which still exists under the name of Hôpital Joseph Ducuing-Varsovie.

The history of the Hospital Varsovia has been well documented in recent years. Its creation was sponsored by exile organisations controlled by the Communist Party of Spain (PCE), as was the case with Solidaridad Española. The responsibility for running the hospital was - formally - that of the Amicale des Anciens FFI et Résistants Espagnols. But the main financial support came for several years from a well-known North American organisation, the Joint Anti-fascist Refugee Committee (JARC), which channeled it through the Unitarian Service Committee (USC). (Note: The Unitarian Service Committee was created in 1940, after the start of World War II, by the American Unitarian Association (a Protestant religious association in the United States and Canada) to carry out humanitarian work, mainly in Europe. The USC archive is located in the Harvard Divinity School Library)

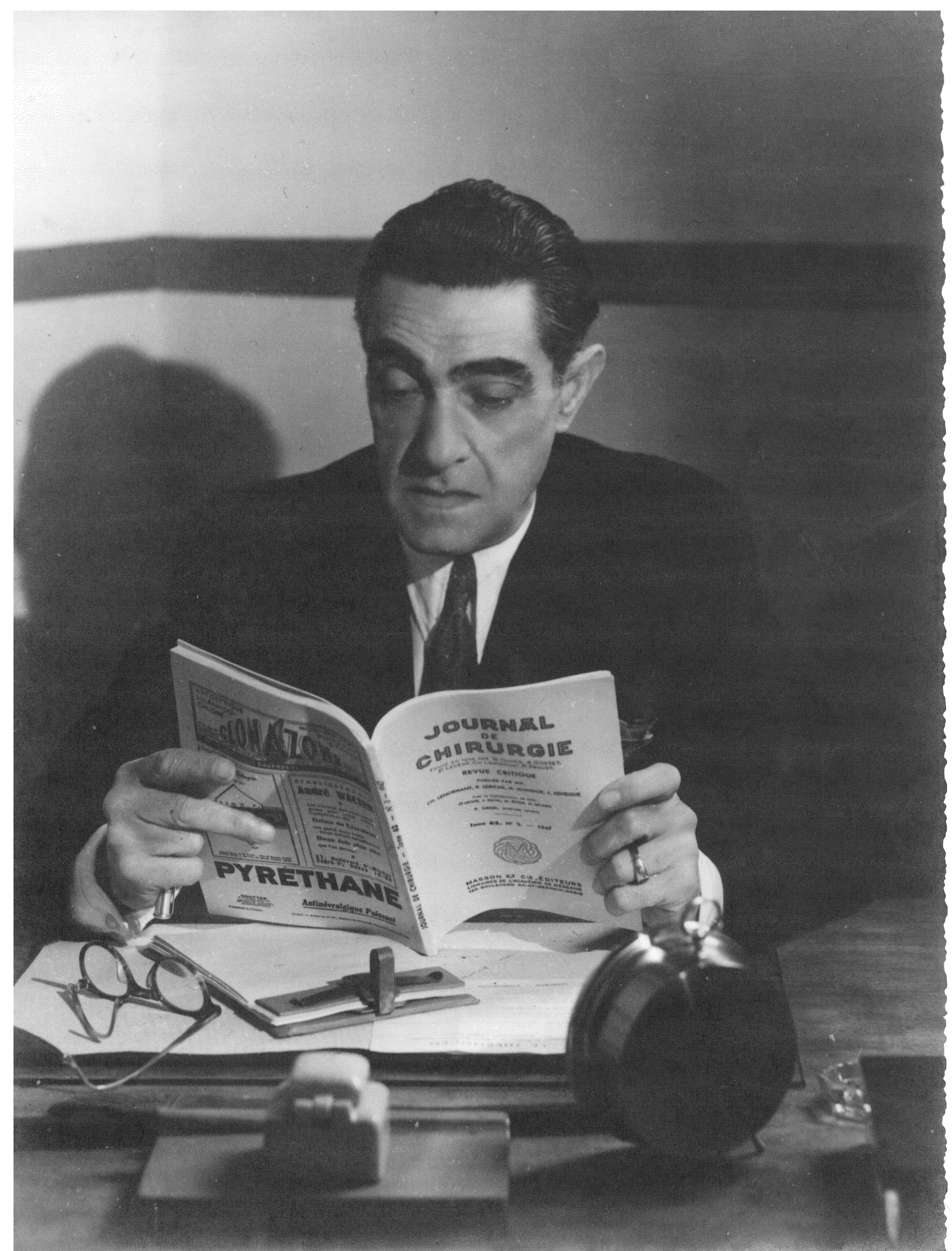
Vicente Parra in the Hospital Varsovia of Toulouse in 1947.

The Hospital Varsovia was created to care for wounded and convalescing Spaniards as a result of the resistance against the Germans and, in particular, of the failed ‘invasion’ of the Aran Valley in the North of Spain, organized by the PCE in October 1944. Later, it would begin to care for all Spanish refugees in general. The pioneering and most complete work to date on the hospital was written by Dolores Villar Basanta in 1997 and remains unpublished.

In those years, the consequences of the anti-communist atmosphere that was incubating in the United States (the actions of the Un-American Activities Committee, the 'witch hunt', etc.) reached the Hospital through the envoy of the USC, Persis Miller, who in September 1946 forced the dismissal of Josep Torrubia as director and the appointment of a person more independent from the PCE as Vicente Parra.

But that same independence of Parra, when the balance of power changed a little later, led to his dismissal in February 1948, when he was replaced by Francisco Bosch Fajarnés. Bosch remained in charge of the hospital until the Bolero-Paprika operation, unleashed by the French government on 7 September 1950, disbanded the Spanish communist organisations in France: the PCE, Solidaridad Española and the Amicale were immediately dissolved and the doctors of the Hospital Varsovia were arrested. Later, a group of socially committed French doctors, led by Joseph Ducuing, bought the hospital equipment and the building.

=== Final destination: Venezuela ===
The same year of his dismissal - 1948 - Vicente Parra left for Venezuela. According to the documents cited from the Arolsen Archives, he embarked in Genoa on the American ship S/S Heintzelman, which sailed for Chile, Peru and Venezuela on 12 December.

In Venezuela, between February and April 1949, he went to Santa Teresa de Tuy (Miranda State) to take a course in tropical medicine, and ended up teaching there. Subsequently, he joined the ‘Medicatura rural’ of Albarico (Yaracuy State), also as a forced part of the process to obtain the validation of his degree.

== Later life and death ==
In 1957, due to health problems, he had to settle in Caracas permanently. Parra died in Caracas in 1967, at the age of 80, without having set foot on Spanish soil since 9 February 1939.
