= SL Cx =

Series of metro train types used in the Stockholm Metro from 1950 to 2024

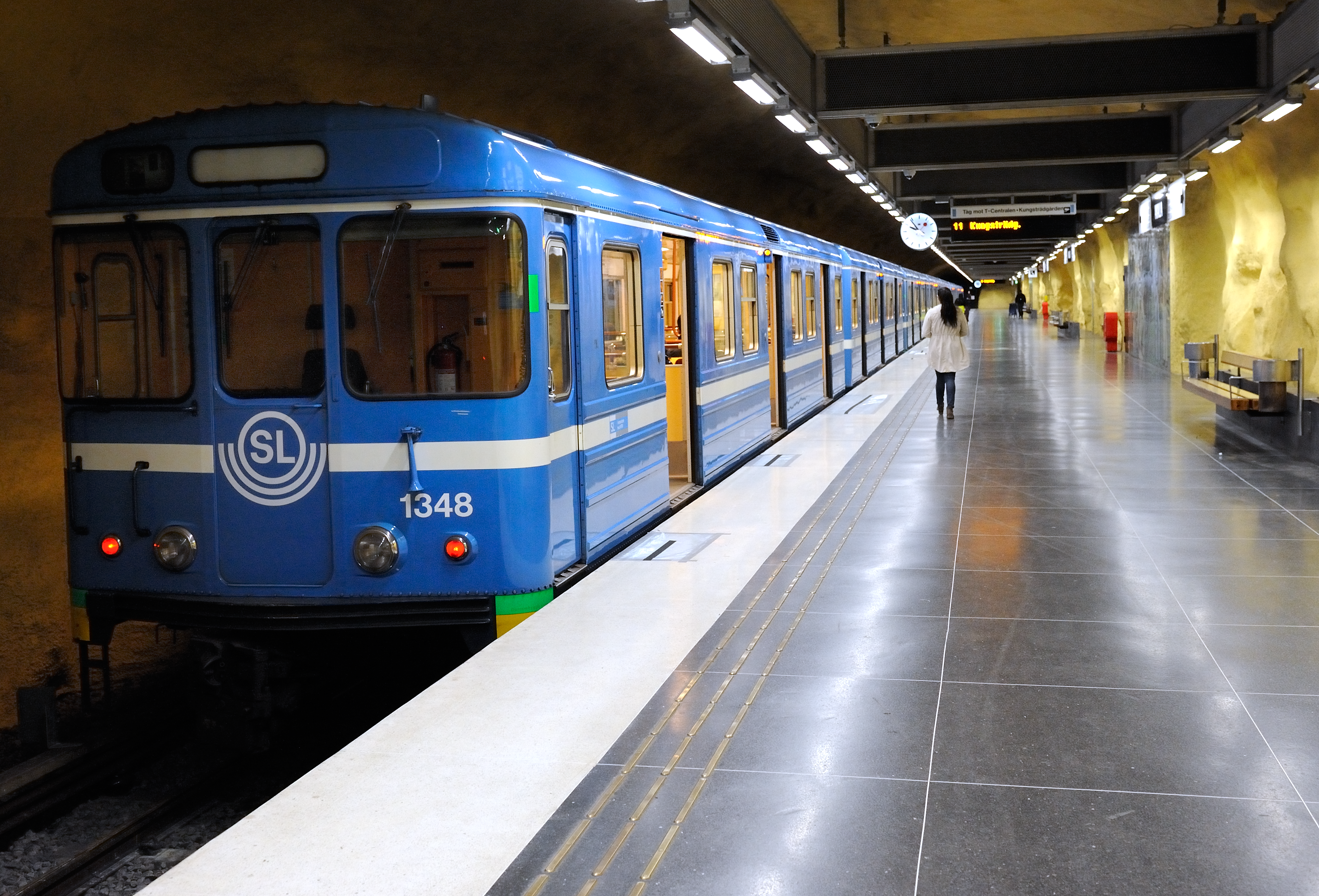
- Cx train at Akalla station

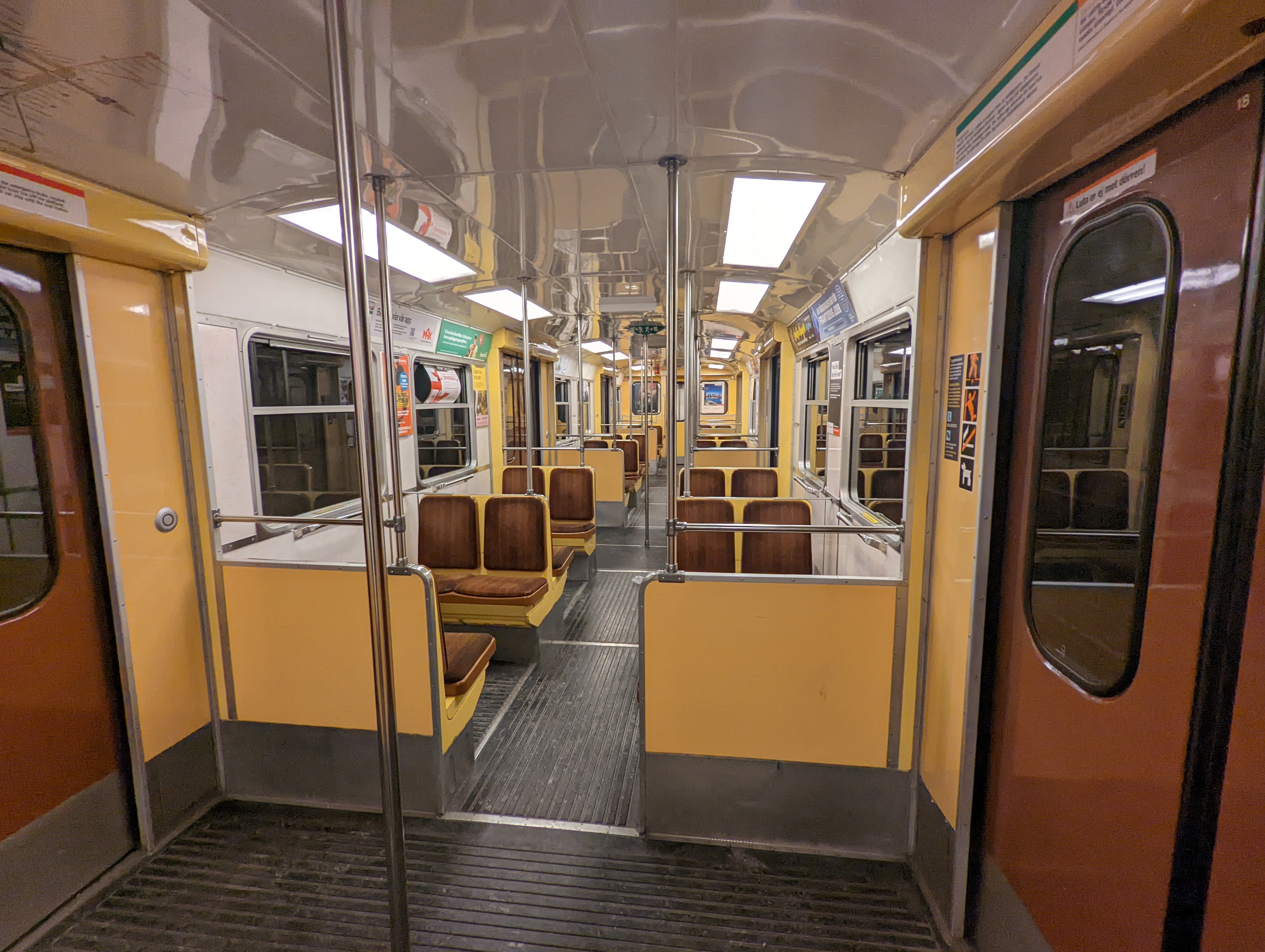
- Interior of a Cx carriage in 2022
- In service: 1950–2024
- Manufacturers: ASEA, Hägglund & Söner, Svenska Järnvägsverkstäderna (ASJ)
- Family name: Cx
- Constructed: 1949–1989
- Entered service: 1950
- Scrapped: 1980s–2024
- Number built: 1291
- Number in service: 0 (since 2024)
- Number preserved: At least 21
- Successor: SL C20, SL C30
- Formation: Single cars, typically 4, 6, or 8-car trains
- Fleet numbers: C1:2001-2020 C2:2021-2325, 2411-2450 C3:2326-2410 C4:2451-2650 C5:2901-2908 C6:2651-2788, 2799-2818 C7:2791-2798 C8:2819-2862 C9:2863-2882 C12:1001-1165 C13:1166-1259 C14:1274-1399, 1460-1463 C15:1260-1273
- Operator: Storstockholms Lokaltrafik (SL)
- Depots: Hammarby, Högdalen, Vällingby, Norsborg, Nyboda, Rissne
- Lines served: Green Line; Red Line; Blue Line

Specifications
- Car body construction: Steel; Aluminium (C5)
- Train length: 8-car train: approx. 140 m
- Car length: 17,300–17,620 mm
- Width: 2,700–2,800 mm
- Height: 3,670–3,780 mm
- Maximum speed: 80–90 km/h
- Weight: 25–30 t per car
- Traction system: DC motors, later chopper (thyristor) control on some types
- Power output: 324–440 kW per car
- Electric system: 650–750 V DC third rail
- Current collection: Contact shoe
- Track gauge: 1,435 mm (4 ft 8 1/2 in)

The SL Cx series is the collective designation for the C1–C15 types of metro trains used on the Stockholm Metro from 1950 until 2024.

Some 1291 Cx cars were built in total over 40 years. They were manufactured by ASEA, Hägglund & Söner and Svenska Järnvägsverkstäderna (ASJ), and underwent significant technical development during their production span.

The cars were typically operated in 6 or 8-car formations, which constituted a full-length train of approximately 140 metres. The Cx cars were designed for interoperability, and most types could be freely mixed within a train.

The Cx series formed the entirety of Stockholm's metro fleet from its inception until the introduction of the C20 units in 1997. The last Cx units were withdrawn from service on the metro in February 2024, following the introduction of the C30 units in 2020. As of 2025, some converted Cx units remain in operation on Saltsjöbanan suburban railway.

== History ==
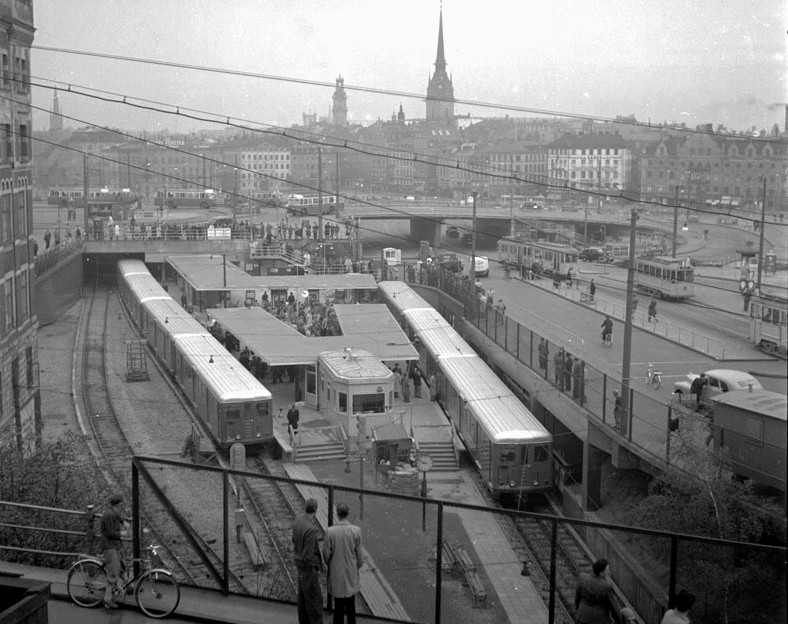
C1 trains at Slussen metro station at the metro's inauguration on 1 October 1950

The Cx series includes the car types C1, C2, C3, C4, C5, C6, C7, C8, C9, C12, C13, C14 and C15. The first units (C1) entered service when the metro first opened in 1950, with the final new cars (C14 and C15) delivered in the 1980s.

The Cx series operated on all lines of the Stockholm Metro: Green, Red and Blue. The Blue and Red Lines were built with longer platforms, allowing up to ten Cx cars per train, while the Green Line operated with shorter trains. The Cx series was used on all lines at various times, with later years seeing C14 and C15 primarily on the Blue and Red Lines.

Traction motors and control gear from withdrawn C1-C3 cars were reused for classes C12 and C13, with C12 also reusing bogies from C1-C3 stock.

=== Livery and Identification ===
The first Cx cars (C1–C7) were delivered in green livery. C6 car 2719 was the first delivered in blue, as an experiment for the blue livery used on C8 and C9 cars. The C5 was unique in its unpainted aluminium finish. C12-C15 were delivered in green with some subsequently being repainted blue.

=== Interior and Refurbishment ===
When delivered C1-C6 cars featured light green interiors with green seating. The C8 and C9 fleets were delivered with orange interiors, brown doors and seats. C12-C15 featured a yellow or orange interior with brown doors seats. The Cx cars underwent several refurbishments during their service life and by 2000 the interiors were generally to the C12-15 standard of lighter interior panelling, brown doors and seats. The C6, C14 and C15 types received the most extensive upgrades, including new audible and visual warnings for closing doors inspired by the C20. Some cars of types C6-C15 had their cabs rebuilt for better ergonomics, with the suffix 'H' added to their type designation.

=== Withdrawal ===
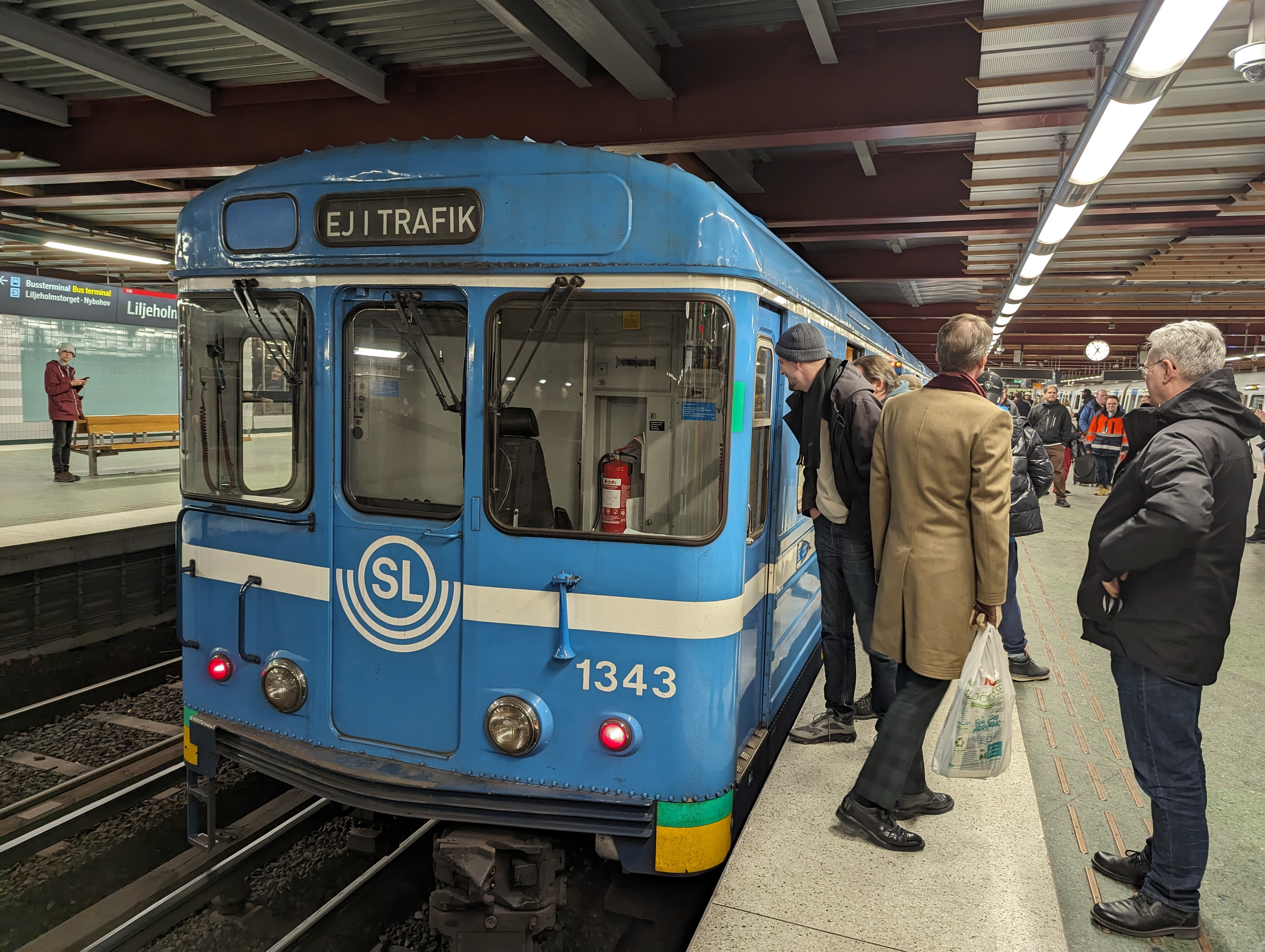
The last Cx unit on its final day of operation, 14 February 2024.

Withdrawal of the original models of the Cx series began in the 1970s and continued as new rolling stock was introduced.

The introduction of the C20 (from 1998) led to the gradual replacement of many Cx cars. The final phase-out occurred between 2021 and 2024 after the introduction of the C30 (from 2020), with about two units scrapped per week.

The last C15 units were withdrawn in May 2023, with the final C14 train running in February 2024. The decommissioning process included the removal of valuable spare parts, and a small number of units were retained.

A number of Cx cars have been preserved or retained for non-passenger use:

- 4 cars of type C2 and C3 as working heritage train
- 12 for conversion or spare parts for the Saltsjöbanan suburban railway.
- 2 as work vehicles.
- 2 for fire training.
- 2 cars (1x C2, 1x C14) preserved by the Stockholm Transport Museum

Previously several cars of Cx stock, including examples of types C5 (at Mannaminne), C9 and C12 were retained for fire training or private preservation.

== Technical and Operational Details ==
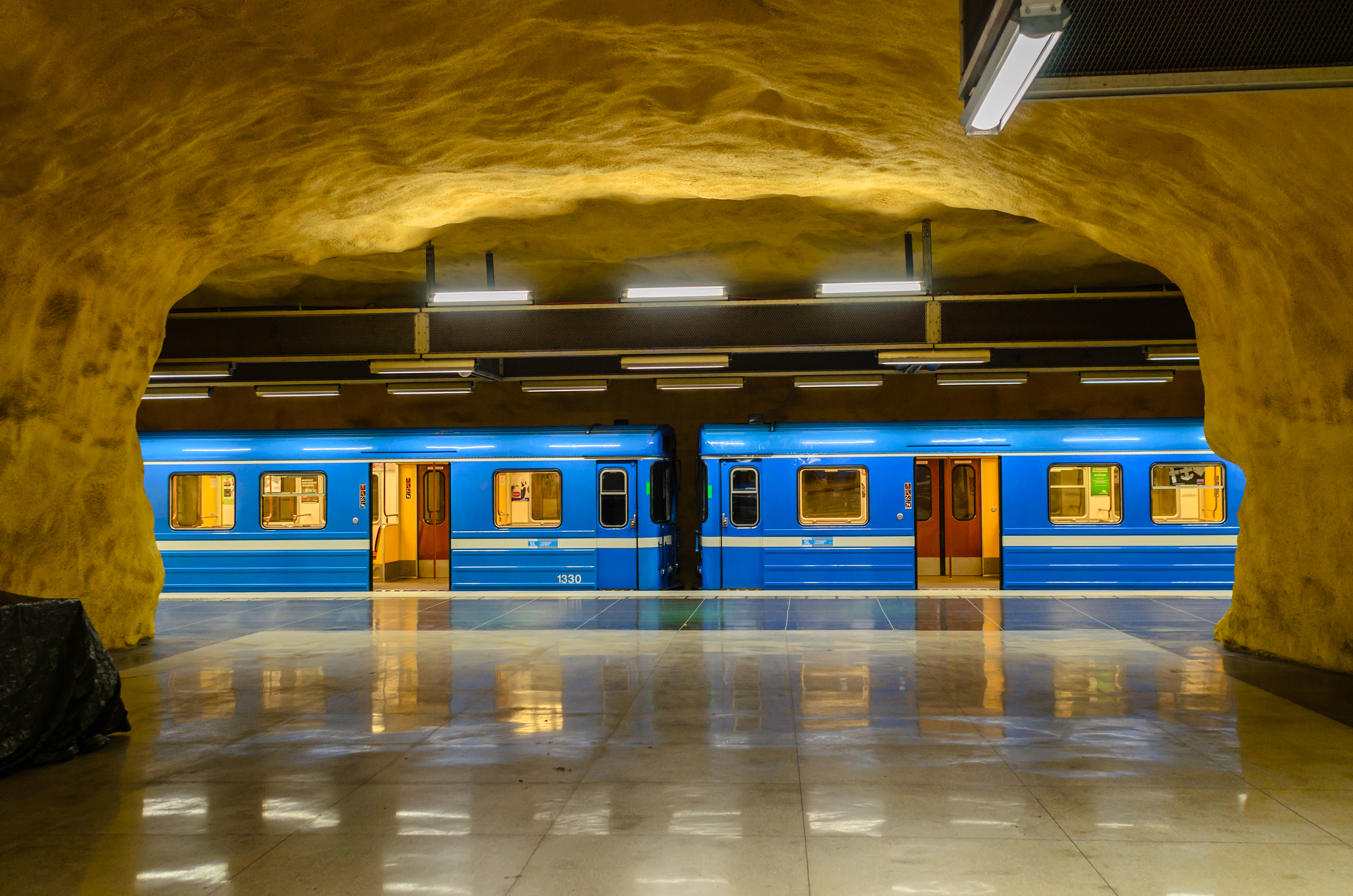
At Akalla metro station, August 2014

The Cx cars were powered by a third rail system, using a nominal voltage of 650 V DC on the Green and Red Lines, and 750 V DC on the Blue Line. The maximum permitted speed was 80 km/h on the Red and Blue lines and 70 km/h on the Green Line, with lower speeds at platforms. Acceleration and deceleration were typically 0.8 m/s².

The rolling stock was equipped with a continuous signal safety system, allowing close-running trains with a high level of safety. Traditional Cx cars used a three-light speed indication system in the cab, while later models and retrofitted cars used a speedometer with a maximum speed indicator. Automatic braking was triggered if the train exceeded permitted speed.

Braking was achieved through a combination of electric (regenerative or rheostatic) and pneumatic systems. Later models, including the C7, C9, C14 and C15, were equipped with thyristor (chopper) control for smoother acceleration and braking.

=== Operations and Lines ===
The Cx series operated on all three metro lines:

- Green Line: Initially the main line for Cx cars, using shorter trains due to platform length.
- Red Line: Operated full-length (8 or 10-car) trains, primarily with later Cx types.
- Blue Line: Required higher voltage (750 V DC) and was served by C9, C14 and C15 types, with C9 built specifically for this line.

=== Timeline ===
Timeline of Stockholm Metro Trains

== Types ==
=== C1 ===
The C1 was the first series of metro cars used in the Stockholm Metro. 20 trainsets were manufactured by ASEA and Svenska Järnvägsverkstäderna between 1949 and 1950; the first set being delivered to Stockholm on 2 June 1949.

Each C1 car measured 17,620 mm in length and 2,700 mm in width, with a total weight of 30 tons. The maximum speed was 80 km/h, with a power output of 324 kW. The C1 had cabs at both ends, allowing for flexible train formation. Wagon 2003 was rebuilt to C2 in 1956, and wagons 2001 and 2002 were rebuilt to C2 1965.

Wagon 2009 was taken out of service in 1978, wagons 2004-2008 between 1980 and 1983 and wagons 2010–2020 in 1983.

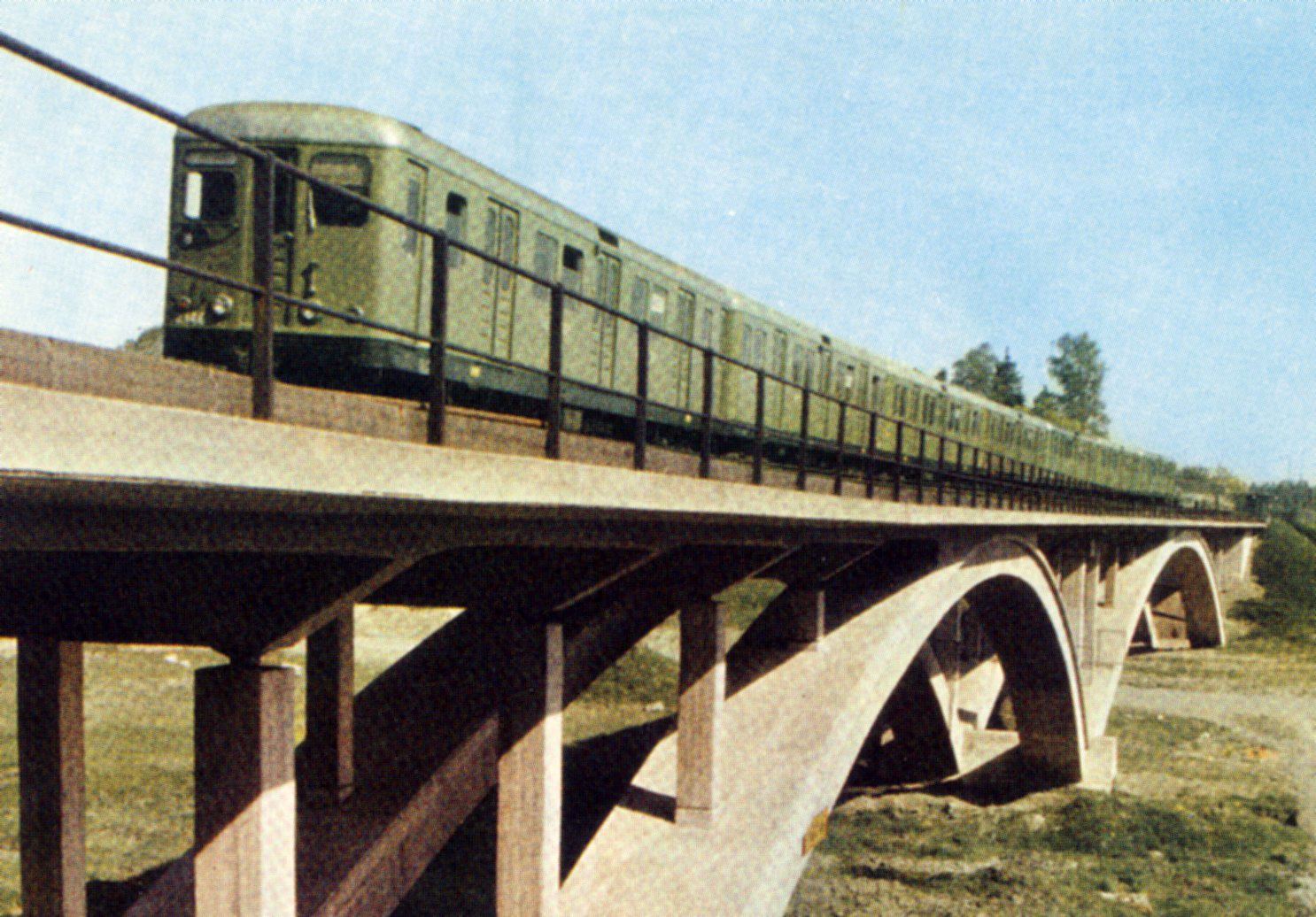
C1 in 1960

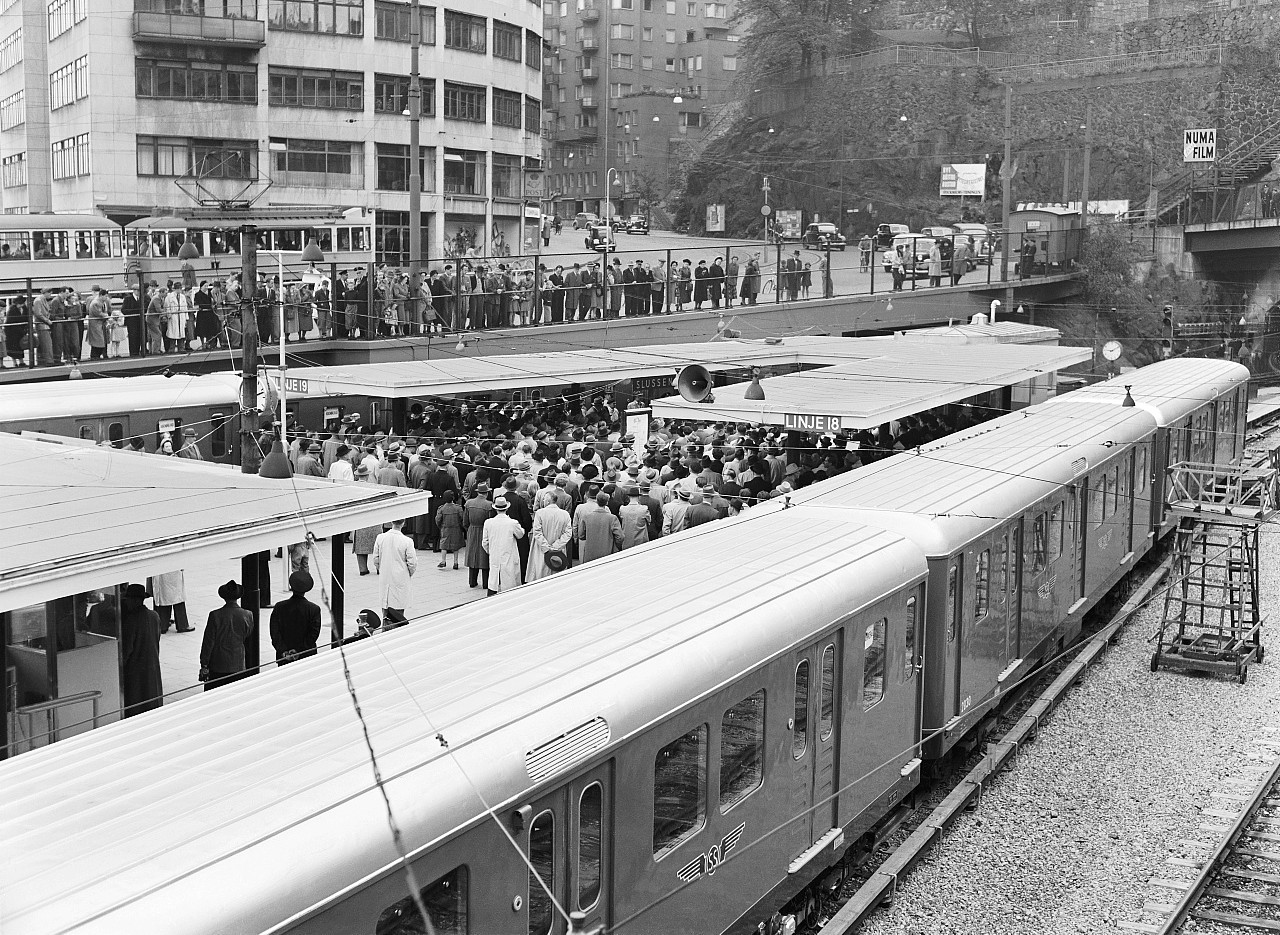
C1 at Slussen for the inauguration of the metro in 1950

=== C2 ===
The C2 was very similar to the C1, produced from 1950 to 1953. Over 100 units were built. Like the C1, the C2 had a steel body and was used interchangeably with other early Cx types.

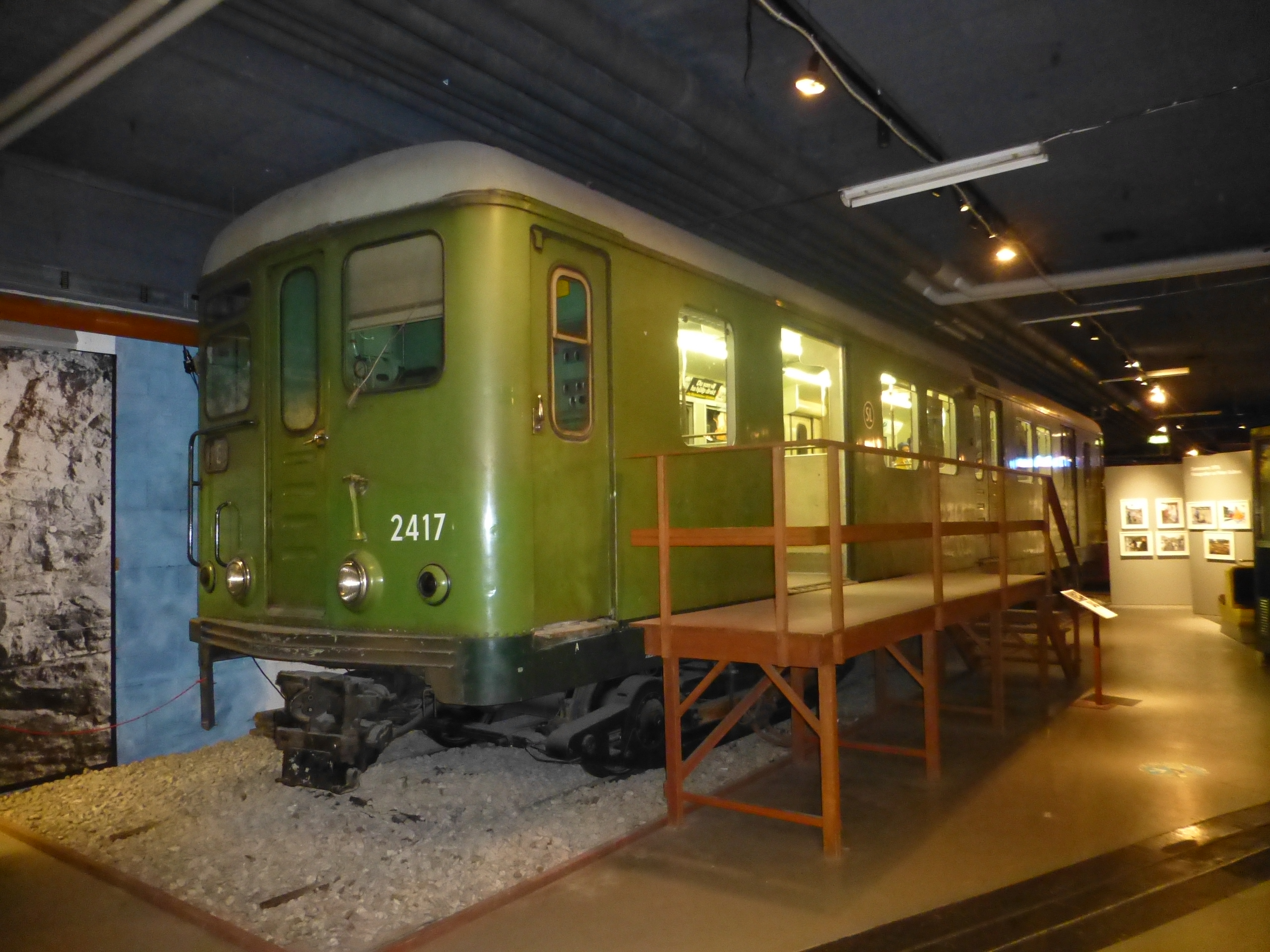
Preserved C2 at Spårvägsmuseet

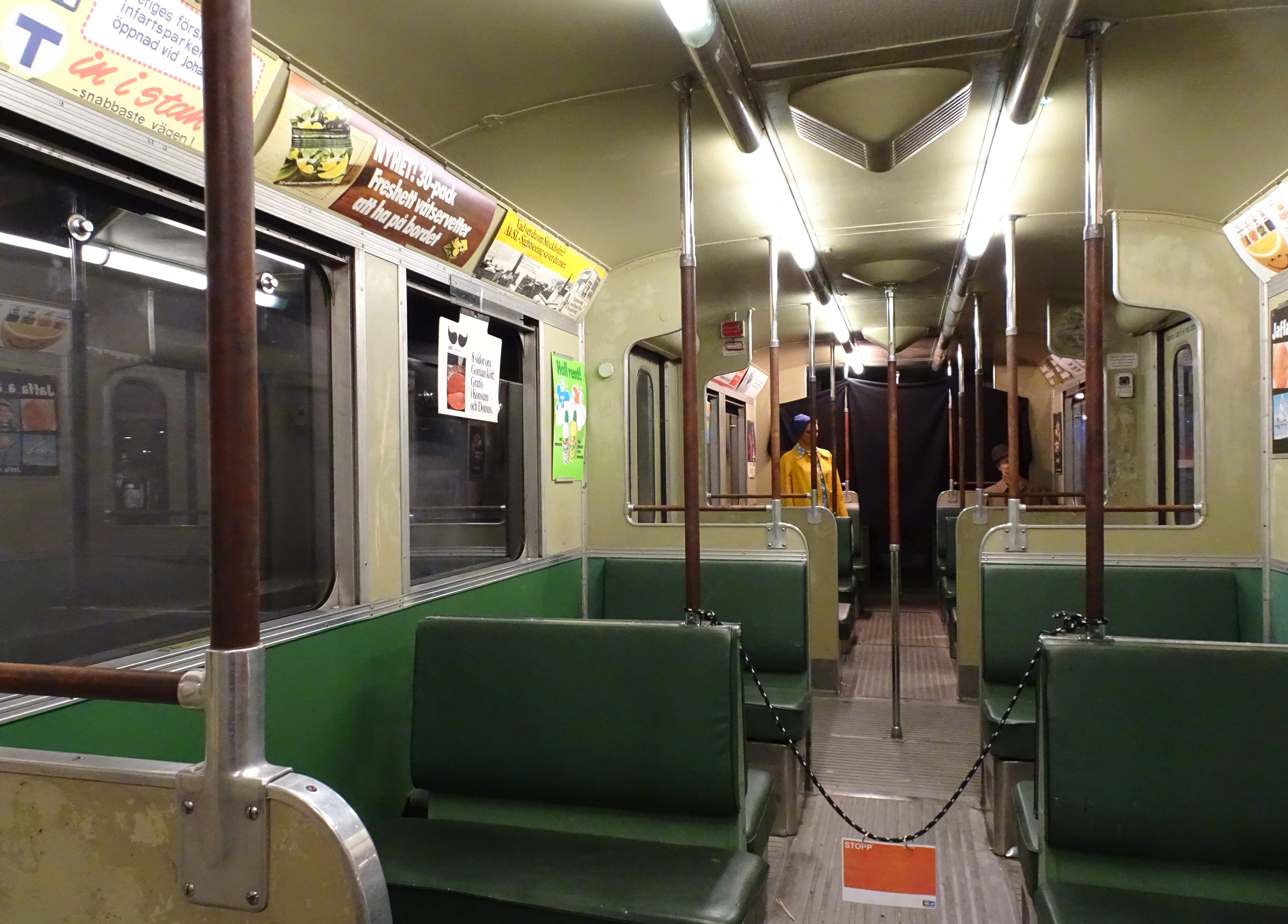
Preserved C2 interior at Spårvägsmuseet

=== C3 ===
The C3 was produced from 1957 to 1959, with 85 units built by ASEA and ASJ. C3 cars were 17,620 mm long, 2,700 mm wide, and weighed 28 t. They had a power output of 324 kW and a maximum speed of 80 km/h. C3s were intermediate cars without full cabs, numbered 2326–2410.

=== C4 ===
The C4 was introduced in the early 1960s and featured a single-end driver's cab. The C4 continued the use of steel car bodies and was compatible with earlier types.

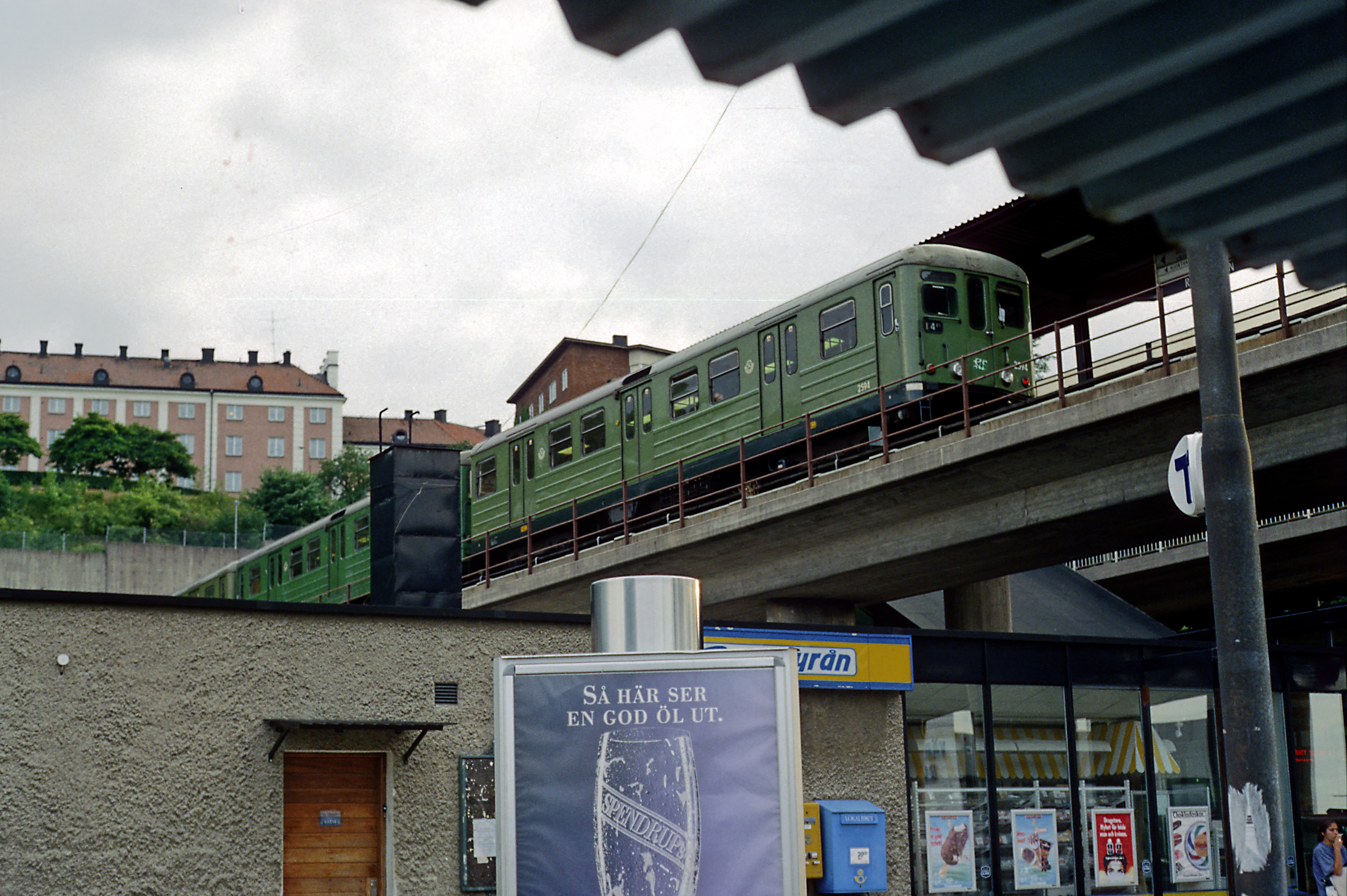
C4 at Ropsten in 1992

=== C5 (Silverpilen) ===
The C5, commonly referred to as Silverpilen (lit. 'The Silver Arrow'), was a prototype train built in the mid-1960s. Only one set consisting of eight carriages was produced. Unlike the standard green-painted trains, the C5 had an unpainted aluminium body, and featured air suspension and outlying sliding doors. Beyond this, it was largely similar to other metro trains operating at the time.

The interior lacked typical advertisements and showed signs of partially removed graffiti. The C5 was rarely used in regular passenger service and primarily operated as a backup train. It was most commonly seen by the public during rush hours, and at night on the Red and Green lines. The train sometimes ran empty to and from the depot without stopping at stations.

The C5 train was featured in the 1993 film Sökarna, which is set in Stockholm. In the film, scenes involving the train depict violent incidents. After being retired in the mid-1990s, some of the C5 cars were preserved. One car is on display in Örnsköldsvik.

==== Urban legend ====
The train's infrequent appearances and distinctive silver color led to urban legends in Stockholm. Some accounts describe sightings of a silver-colored ghost train traveling through the metro system late at night. Other stories associate the train with the abandoned Kymlinge station, which is sometimes referred to as a ghost station.

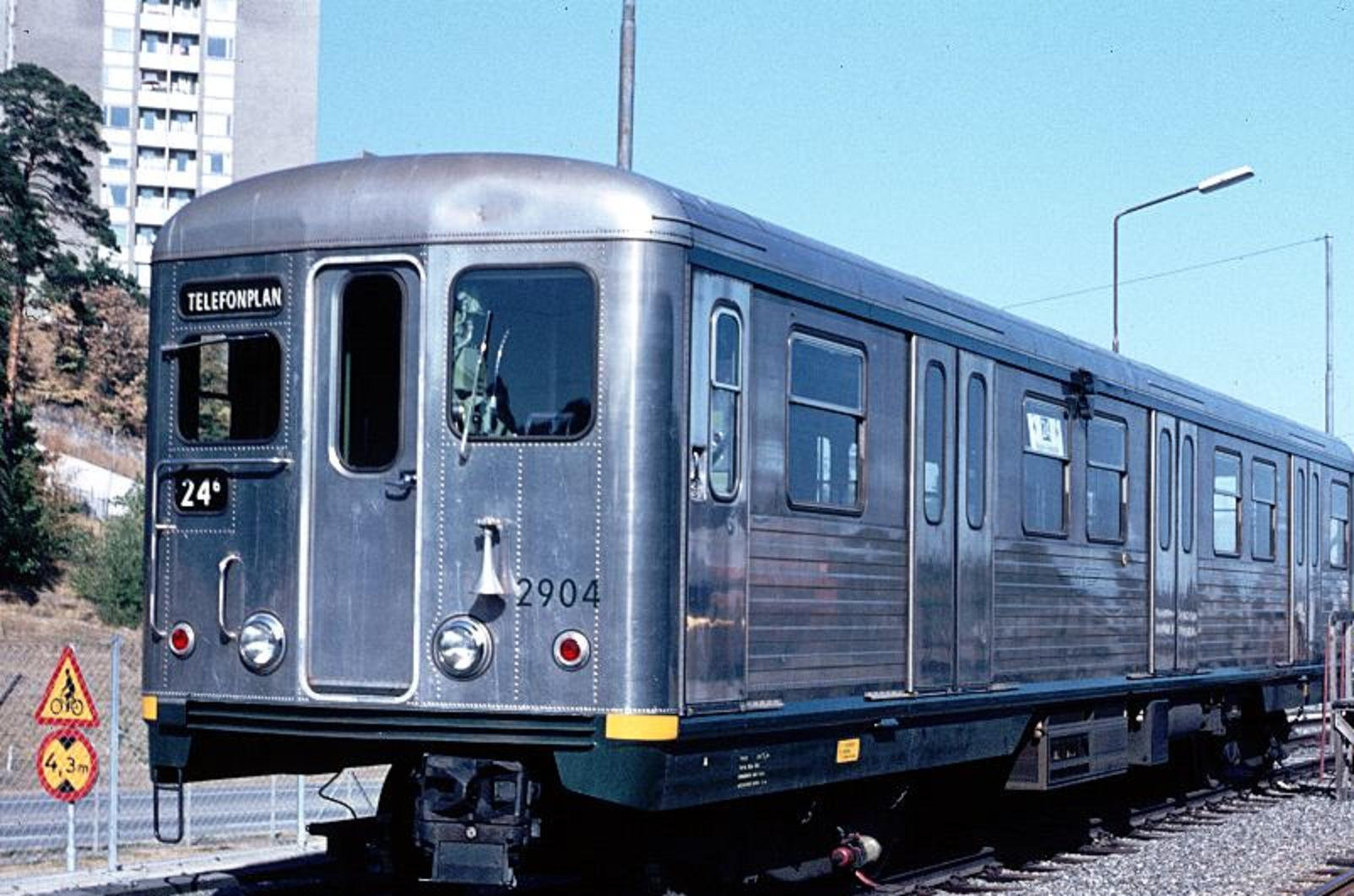
C5 "Silverpilen" prototype train

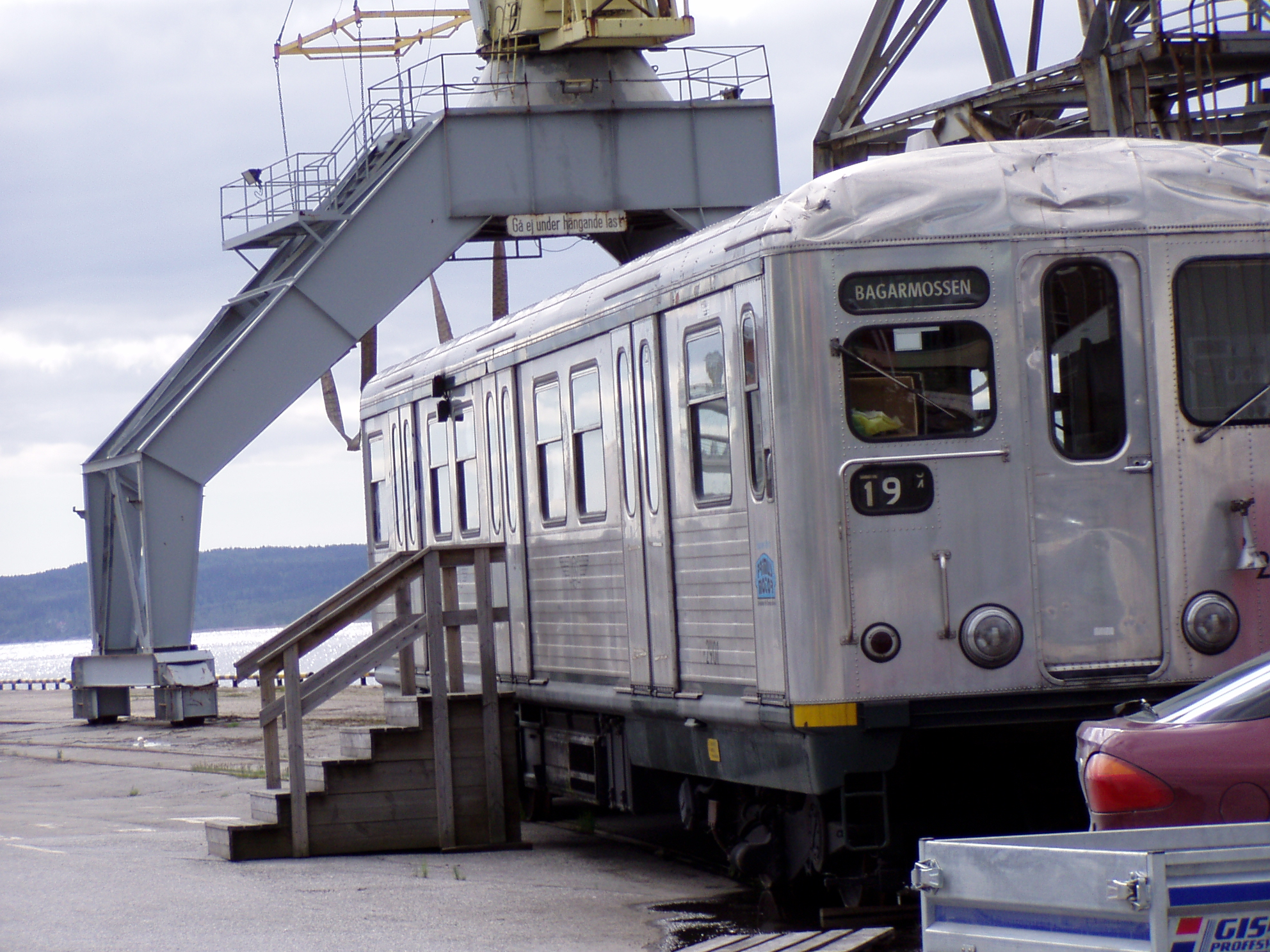
Retired C5 on display in Örnsköldsvik

=== C6 ===
The C6 was produced in the early 1970s and featured a modernised cab and improved comfort. The last 20 C6 units, as well as all C7, C8 and C9 units, were semi-permanently coupled in pairs.

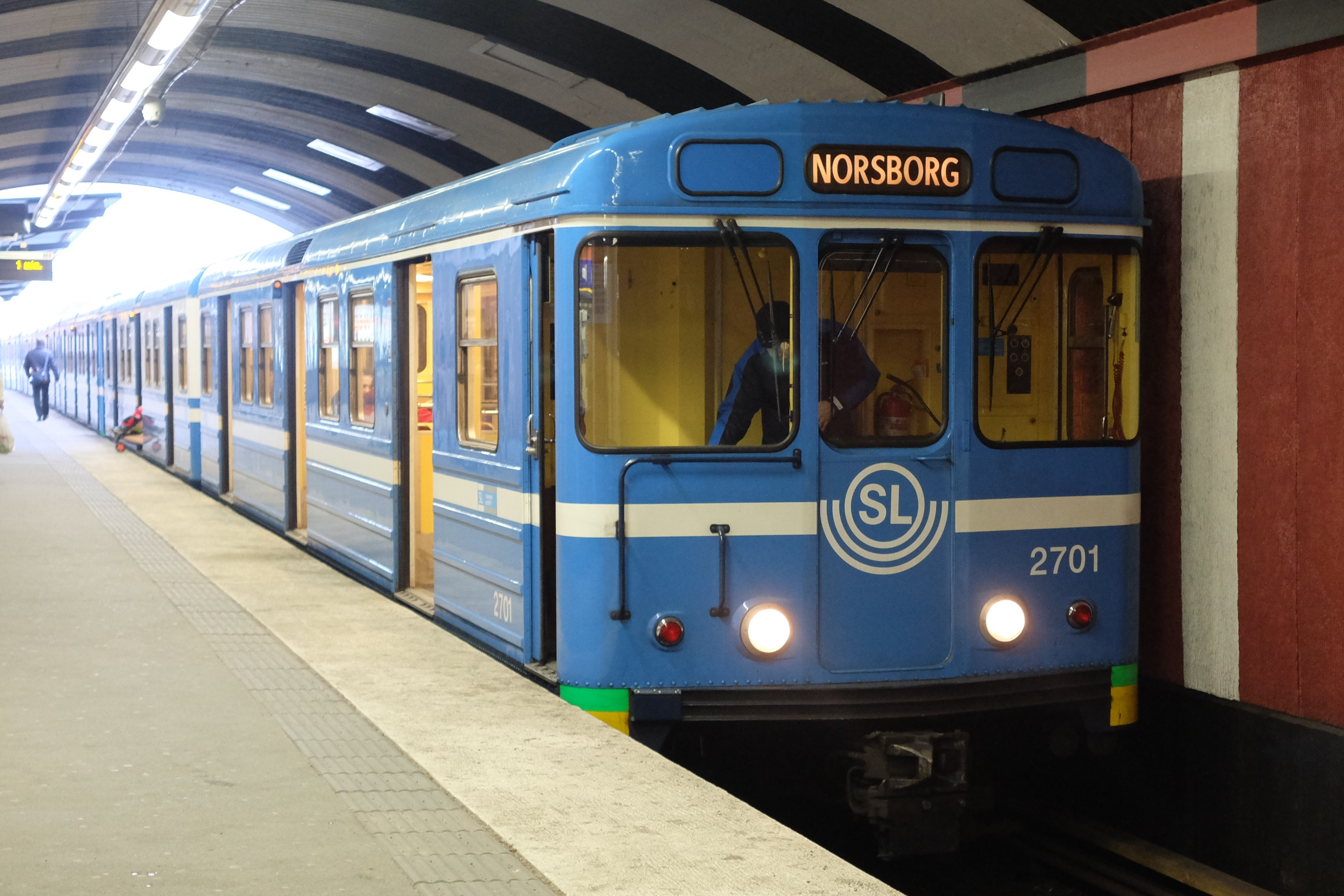
C6 at Ropsten in 2017

A number of cars were rebuilt with experimental interiors in 2010 prior to the design of the C30 fleet.

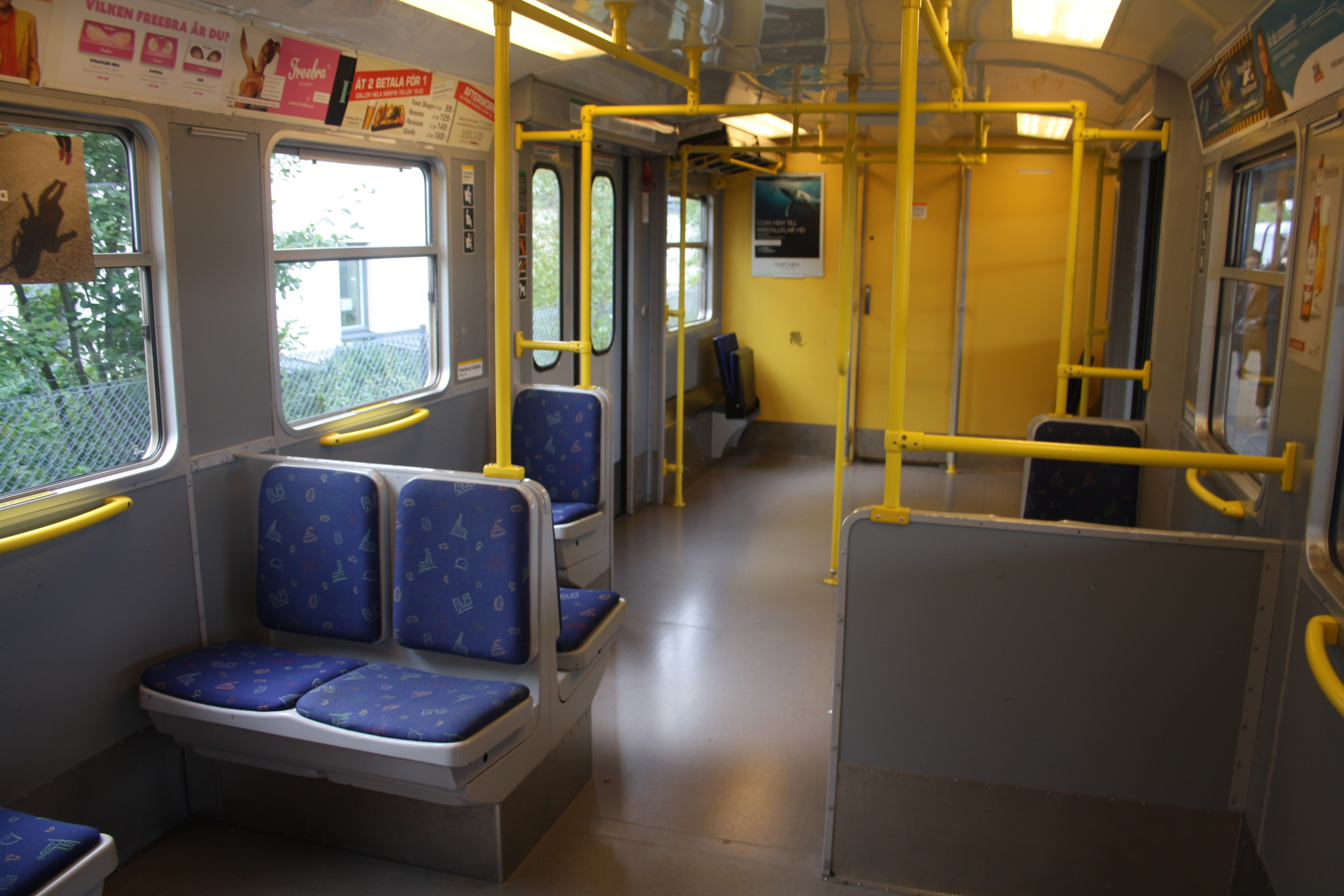

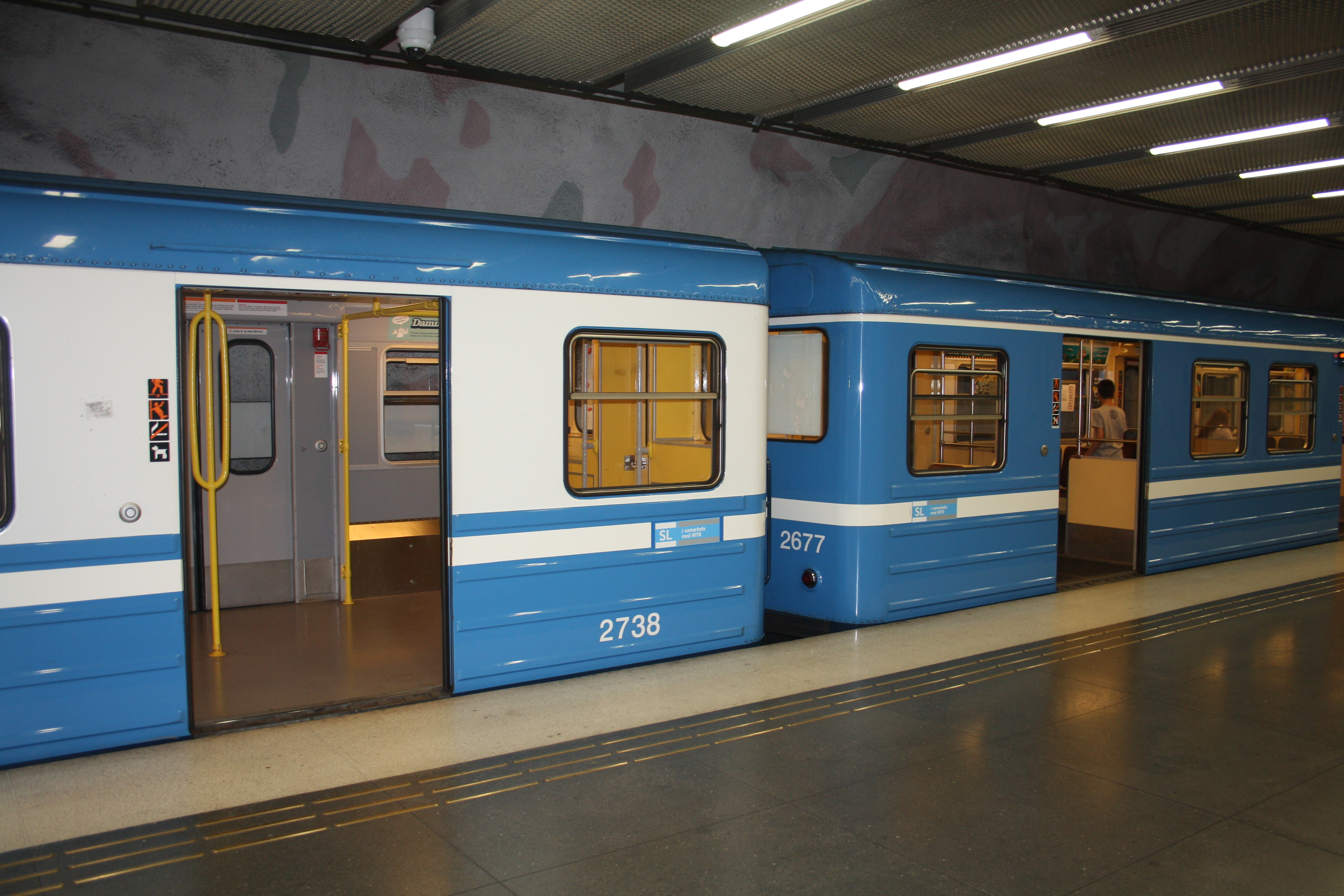

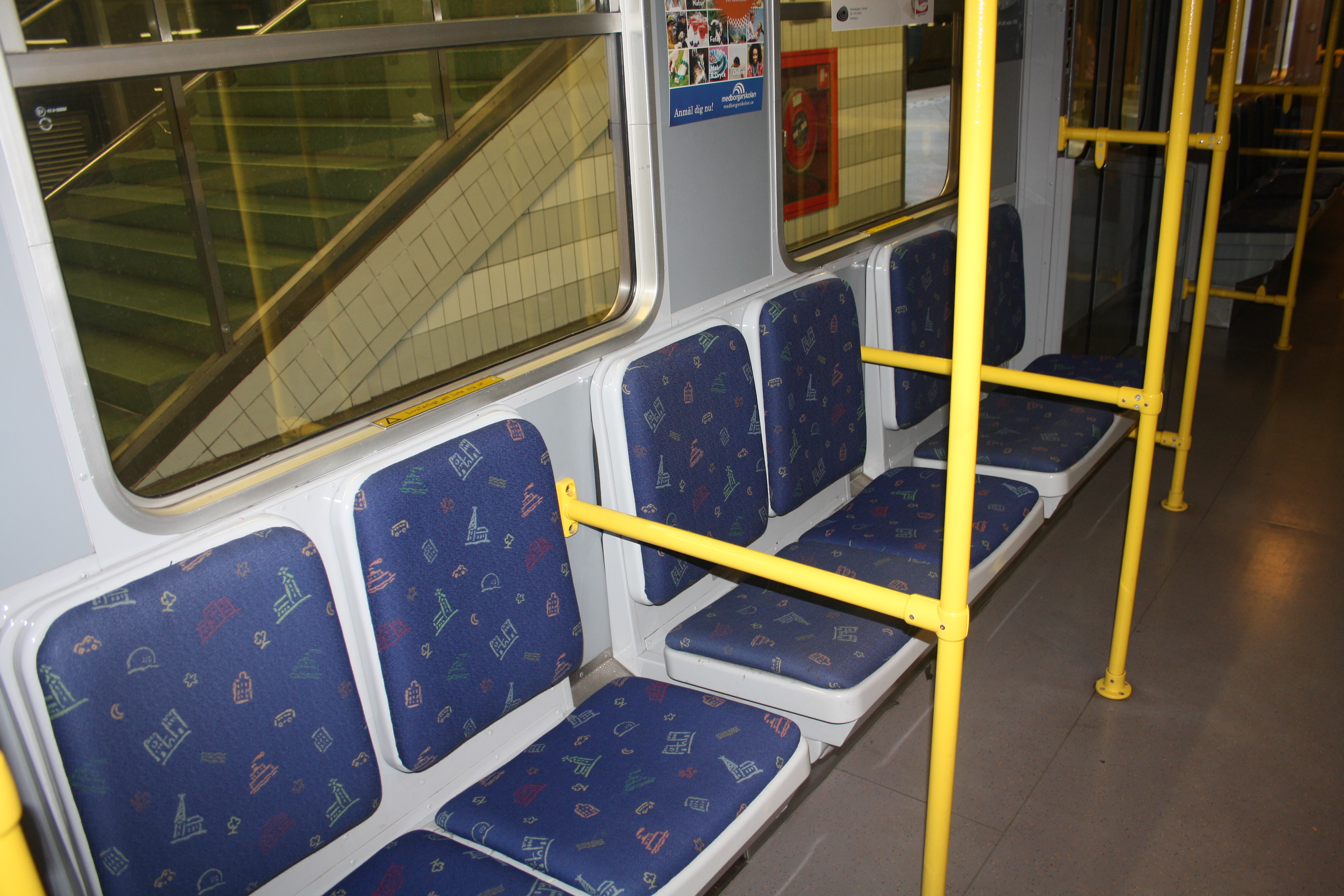

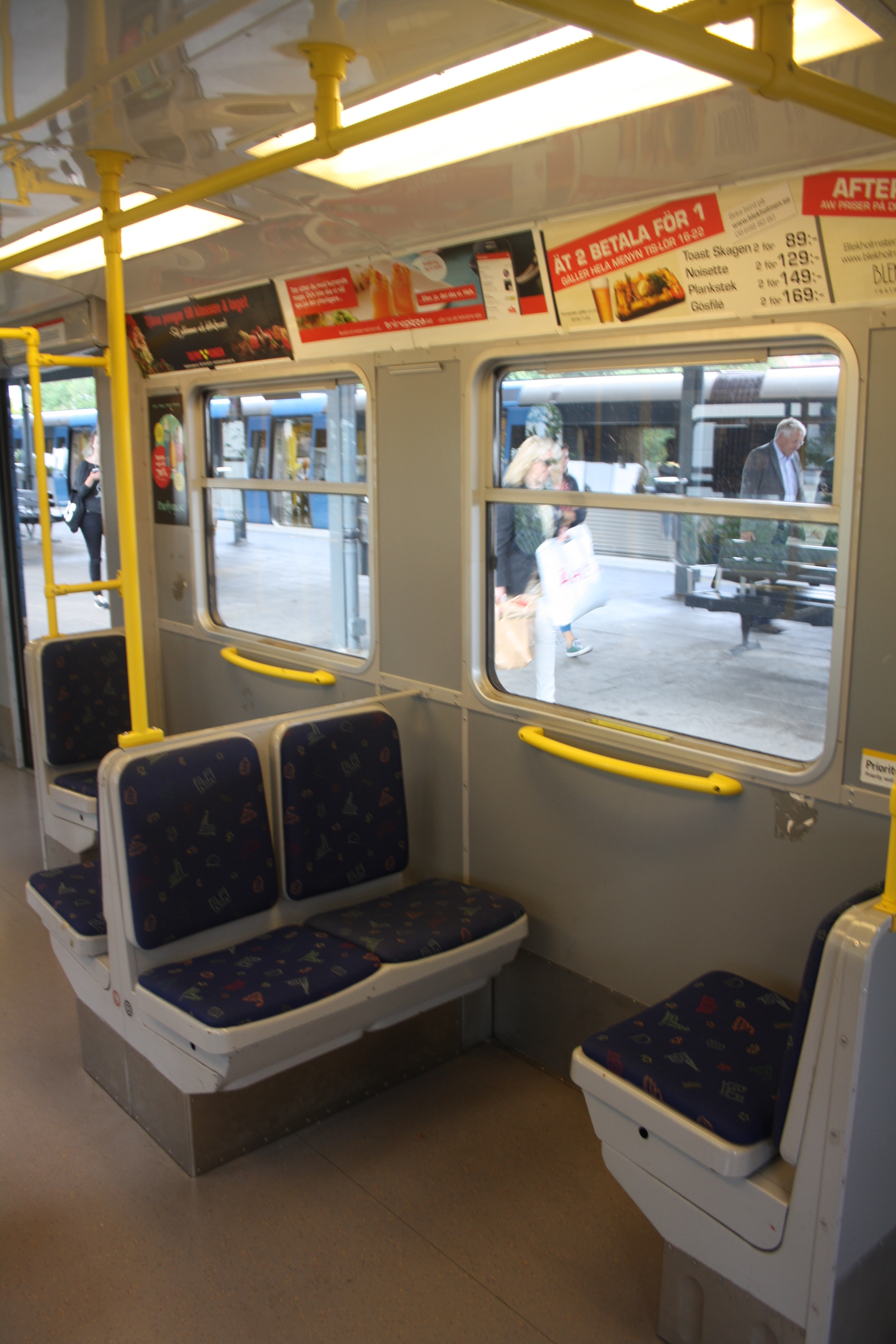

=== C7 ===
Built in the early 1970s, the C7 introduced thyristor (chopper) control and semi-permanent coupling. These cars were designed for improved energy efficiency and reliability.

=== C8 ===
The C8, produced in the mid-1970s, was delivered in blue livery and some units were later rebuilt for use on the Saltsjöbanan.

=== C9 ===
The C9 was built from 1976 to 1977 by ASEA and Hägglund & Söner, with 20 units produced (numbers 2863–2882). These cars were 17,400 mm long, 2,800 mm wide and 3,780 mm high, with a weight of 25 tons per car. Each car was equipped with ASEA LJB29X traction motors delivering a total power output of 400 kW, enabling a maximum speed of 90 km/h.

The C9 was designed specifically for the Blue Line and was more similar to the C7 stock than the C8, as it used thyristor control for both traction motors and brakes. Compared to earlier models (C6–C8), the C9 featured more powerful motors, increasing its top speed from 80 km/h to 90 km/h. The service weight of one C9 unit was 25 tons, which is 2 tons heavier than the C6, C7 and C8 stock. Like the previous C8 stock, the C9 was delivered in the "Bernadotte" blue livery from the beginning.

During its service life, the C9 operated exclusively on the Blue Line. It was in traffic from 1976 until 2009, when 19 of the 20 cars were scrapped. The last remaining unit, number 2873, was used as a practice wagon for the fire service in Ågesta until it was scrapped in October 2021 and replaced by two older C6 units.

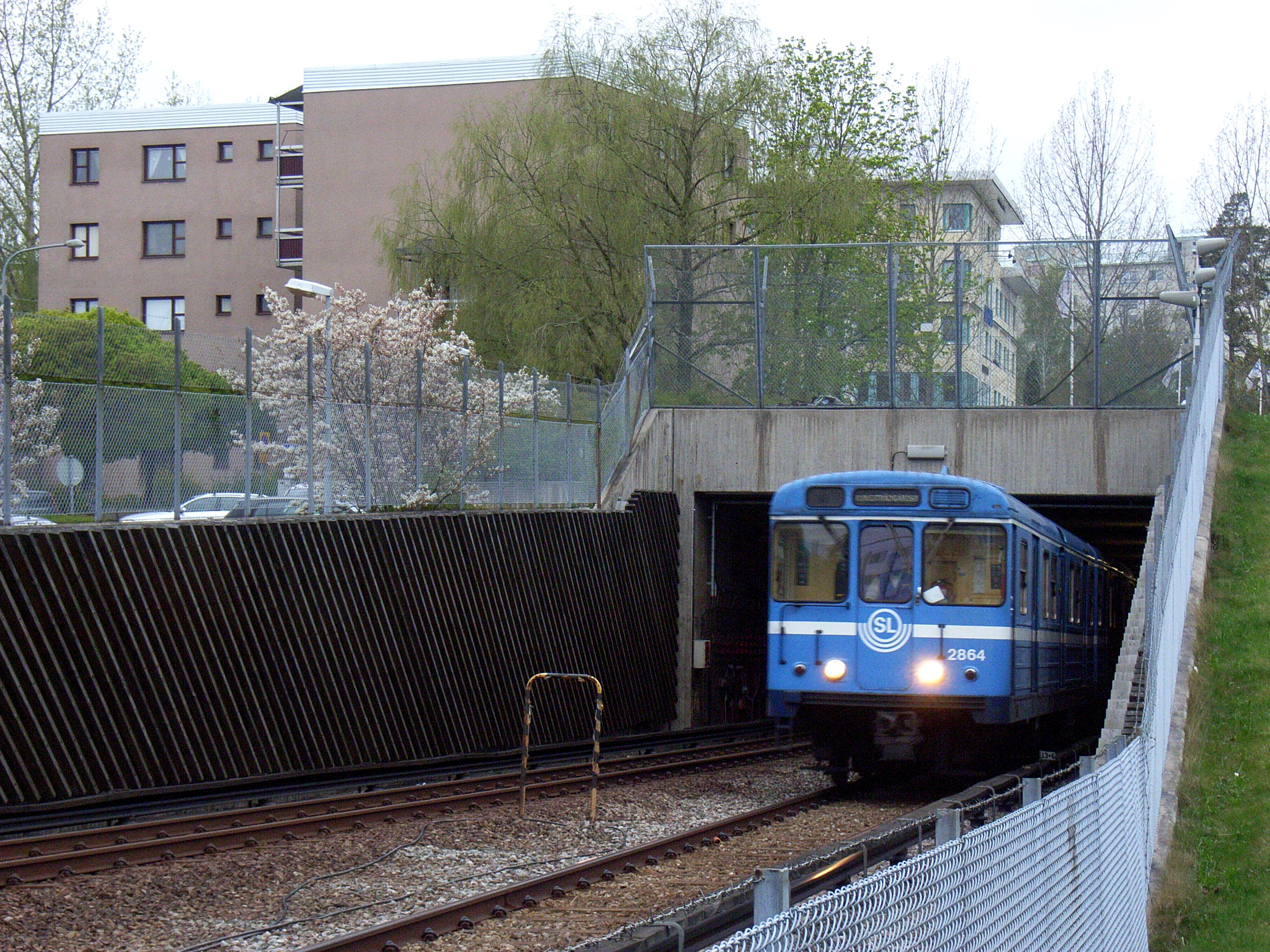
C9 on the Blue Line in 2008

=== C12 ===
The C12, built in 1977, reused technology from the earlier C1–C3 series and served as a transitional type.

=== C13 ===
The C13, introduced in 1982, was similar to the C12, with some units later rebuilt as C13H.

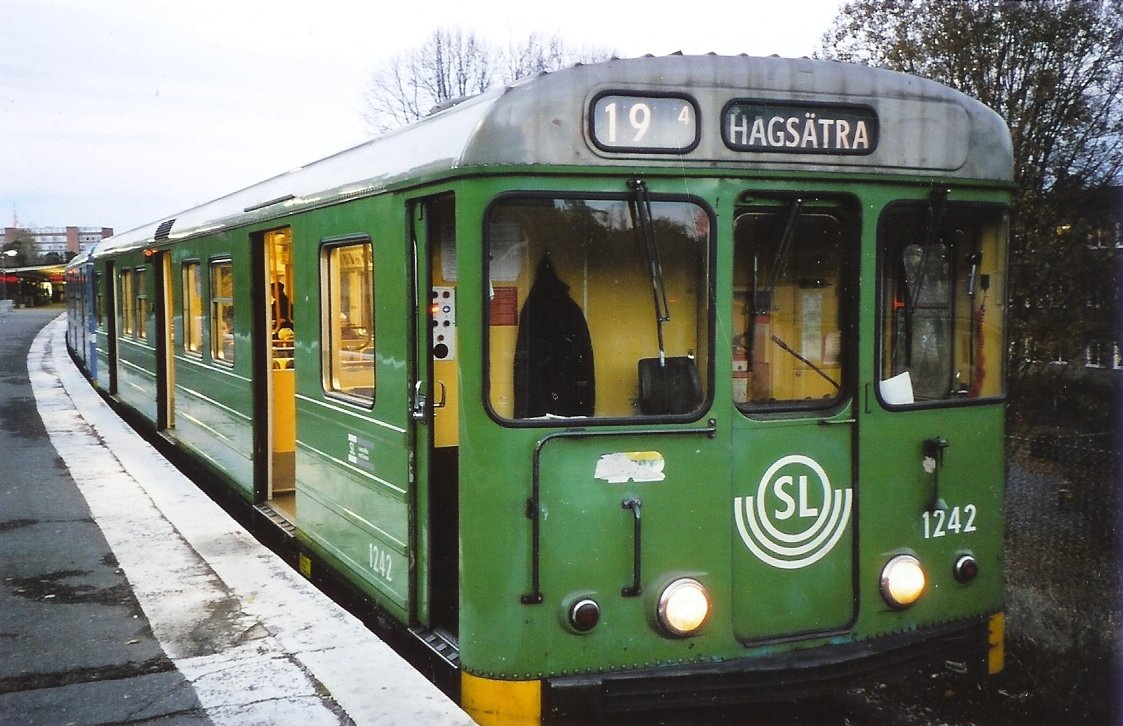
C13 at Sockenplan in 2002

=== C14 ===
The C14 was produced from 1985 to 1989, with 126 units built. Each car was 17,620 mm long, 2,800 mm wide, and had 48 seats. The C14 featured chopper (thyristor) control and was the last Cx type in regular service, withdrawn in February 2024.

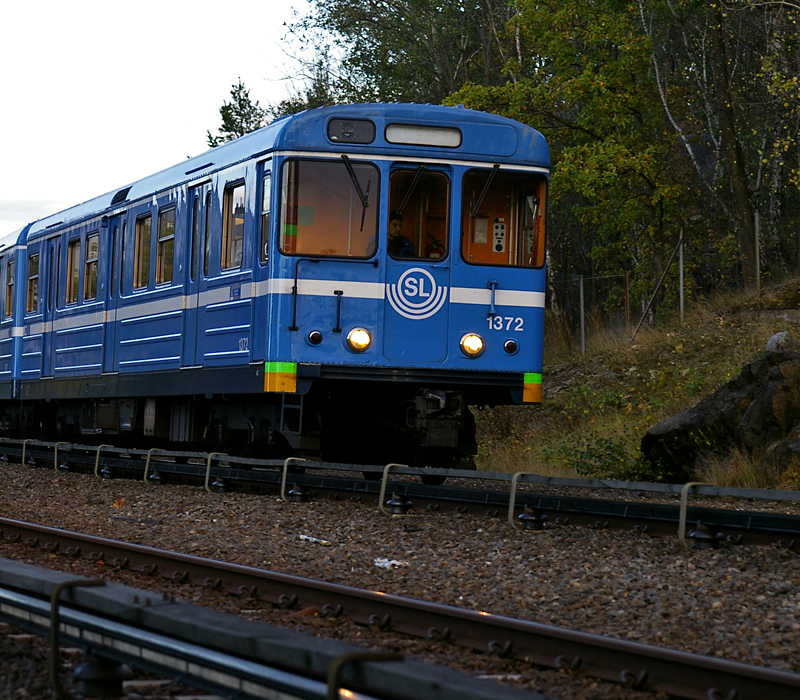
C14

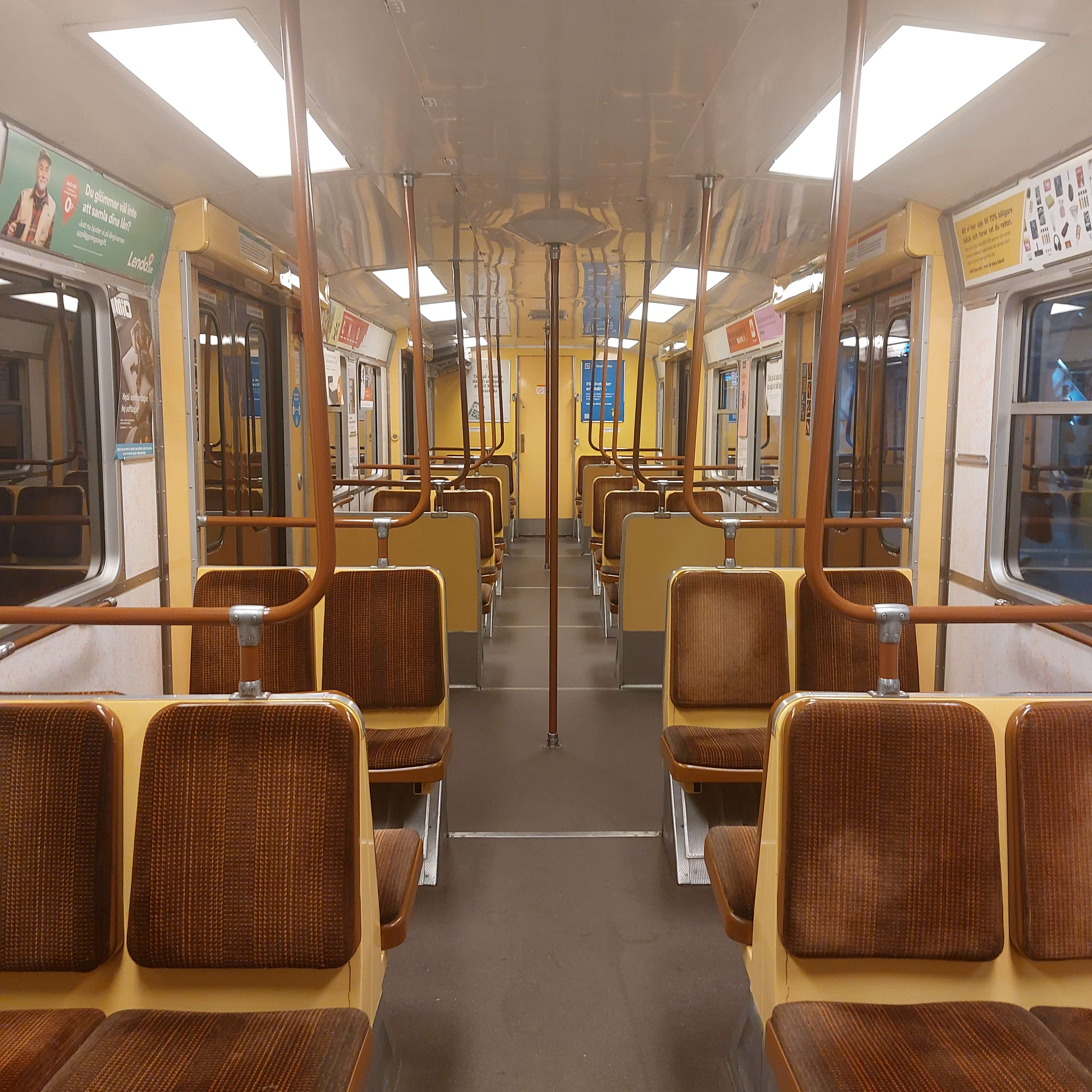
C14 interior

=== C15 ===
The C15 was built in 1985, with 14 units produced (numbers 1260–1273). These cars were similar to the C14 but featured all-new equipment and semi-permanent coupling. Each car was 17,620 mm long, 2,800 mm wide, weighed 26 t, and had a power output of 440 kW. Four C15 cars (1270–1273) had their cabs rebuilt in 1998, and all C15s received interior refurbishment in the early 2000s.

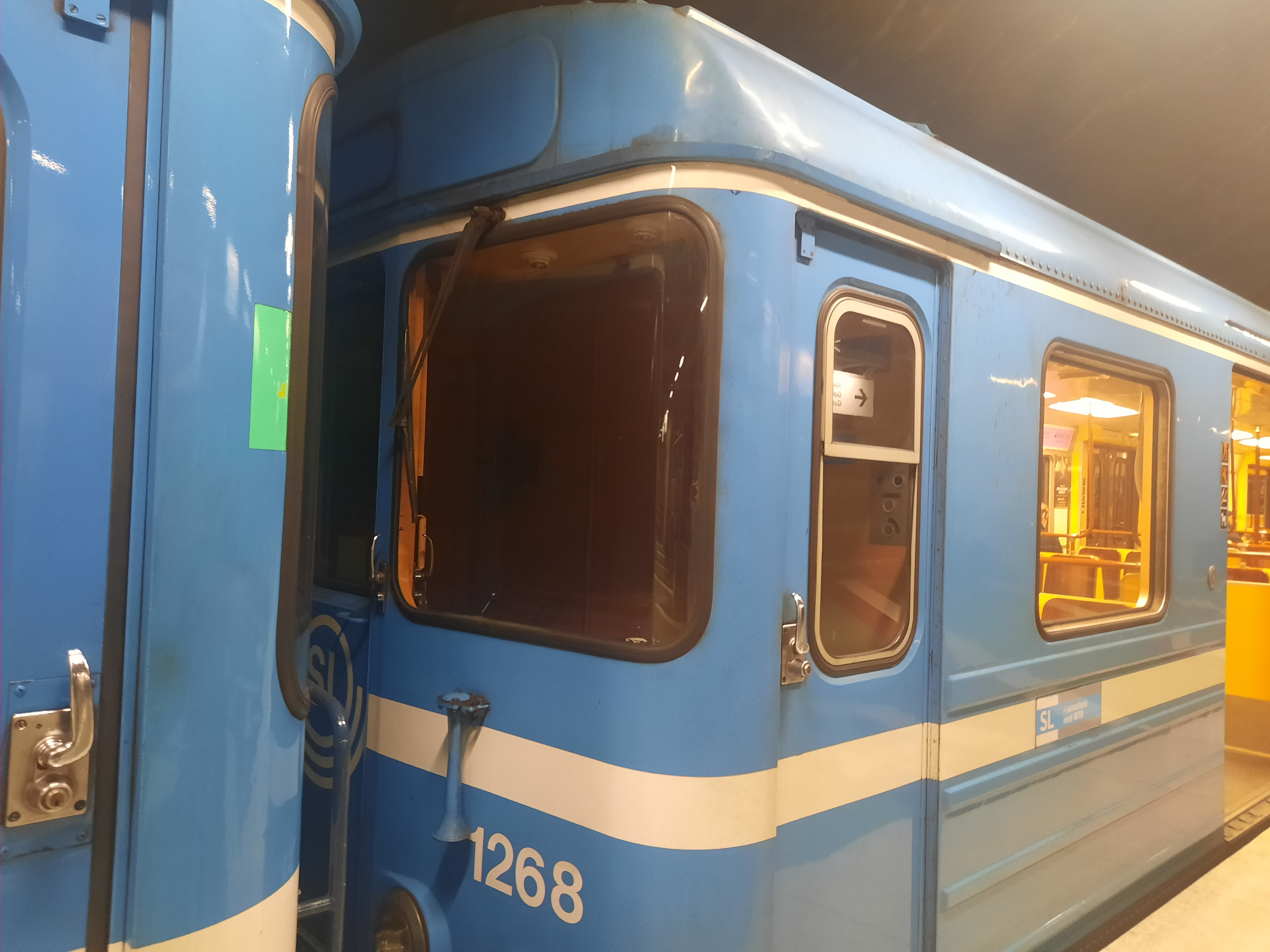
C15

== Additional models ==
=== C16 and Saltsjöbanan ===
The C16 was a variation of the Cx series used on the Saltsjöbanan suburban railway in Stockholm. Two units, numbered 2917 and 2919, were rebuilt in 1987 from former C6 cars by ASEA and Hägglund & Söner. Unlike the more common C10 and C11 units, the C16 cars were equipped with driver cabs at both ends and could operate independently as single cars. They were adapted for the line's 750 V DC overhead supply with roof-mounted pantographs, featured a Bo'Bo' wheel arrangement, and had a capacity of 134 passengers.

The C16 units were withdrawn from service around 2001 and later scrapped. Today, the Saltsjöbanan is operated with C10 and c11 types which were based on the C8 design. Several C6 and C8 cars have been rebuilt for use on the line.

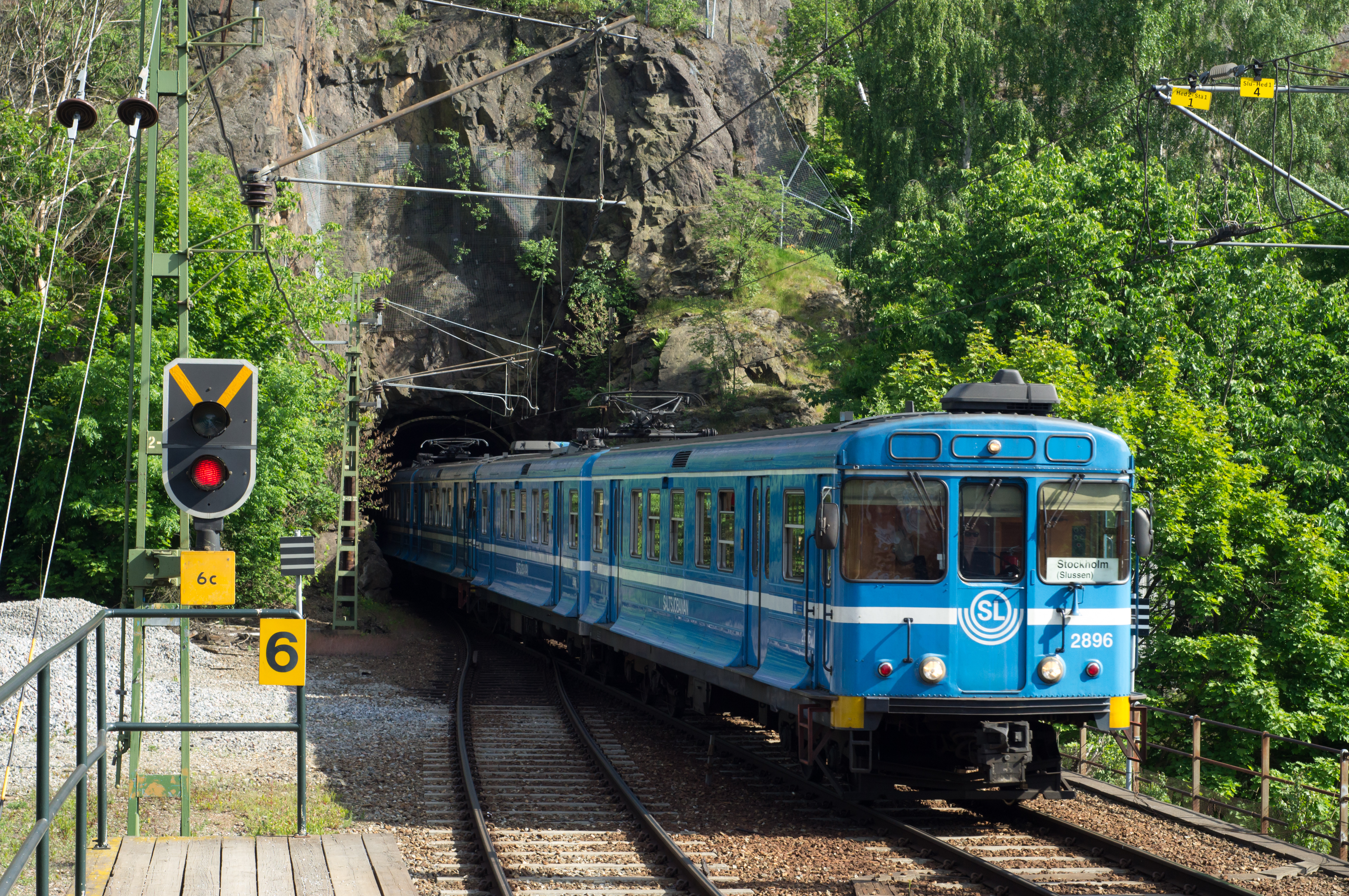
Former Cx unit in use on the Saltsjöbanan

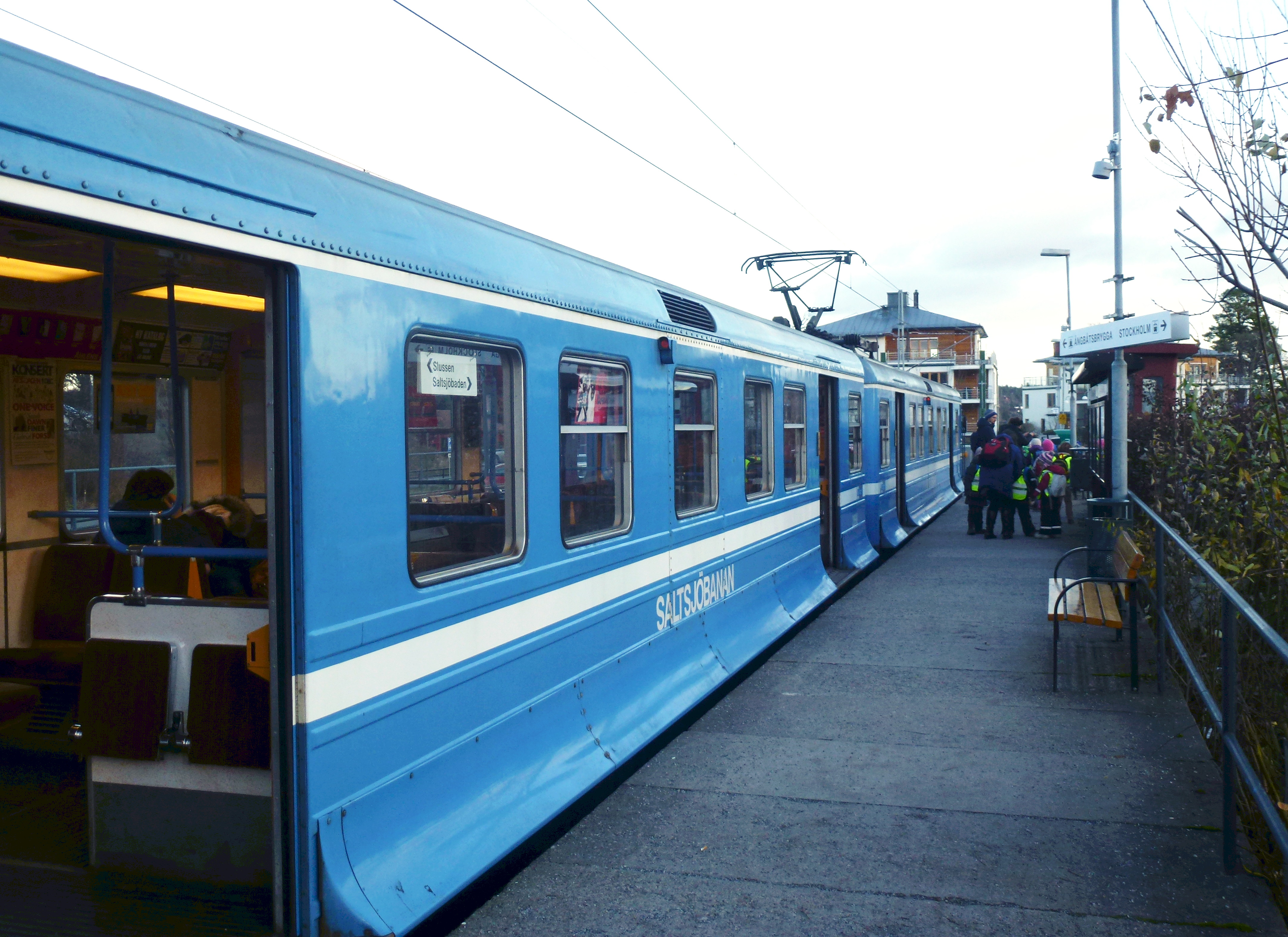
Former Cx unit in use on the Saltsjöbanan

=== C19 Project ===
Additionally, in the late 1990s and early 2000s, there were plans to rebuild C7, C9, C14 and C15 as C19, with interiors and exteriors similar to the C20. This project was scaled back, resulting in only interior upgrades and new door warning signals for C14 and C15. The C7 was scrapped instead of being rebuilt.
