= Ghost train =

Folklore trope

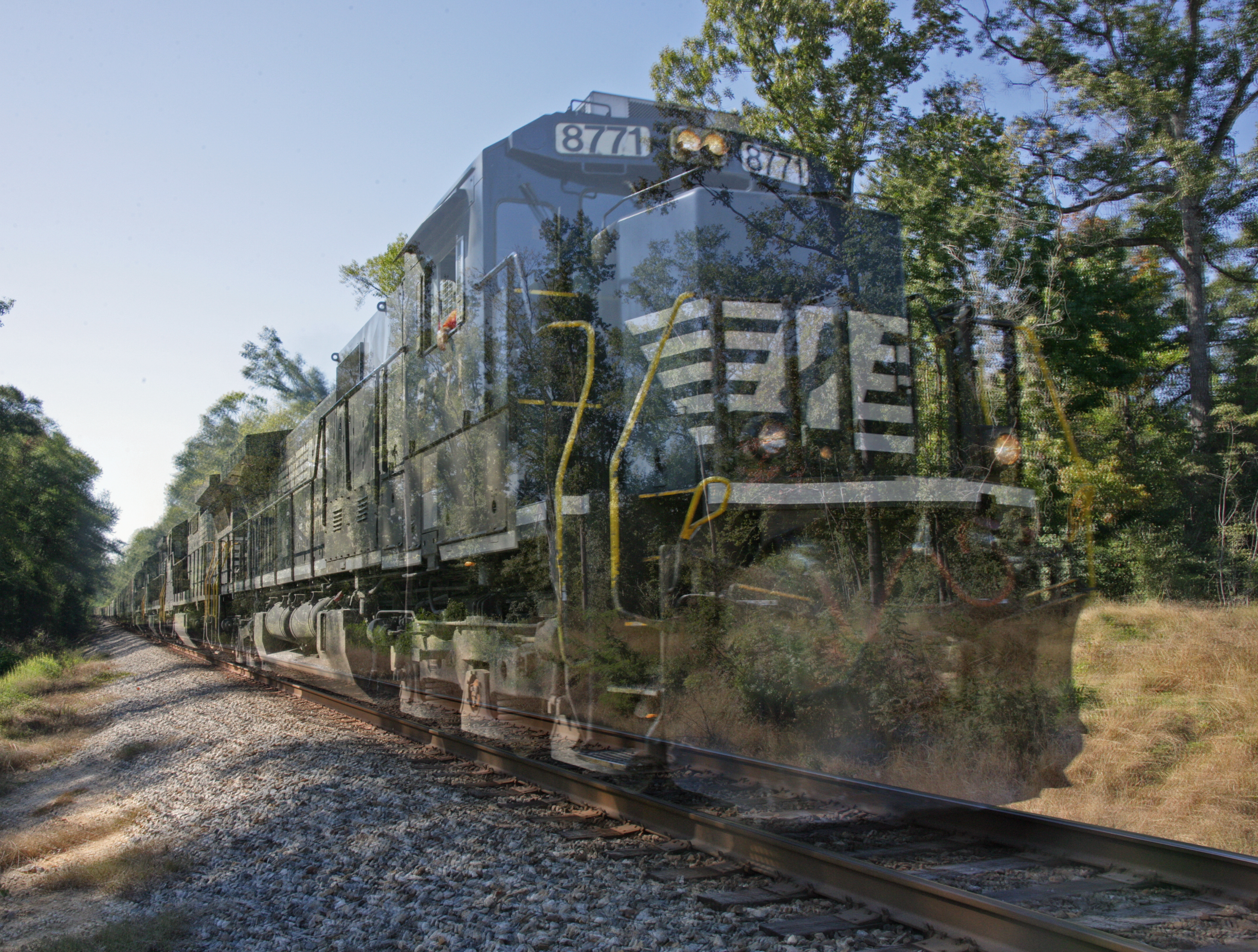
Conceptual image of a ghost train

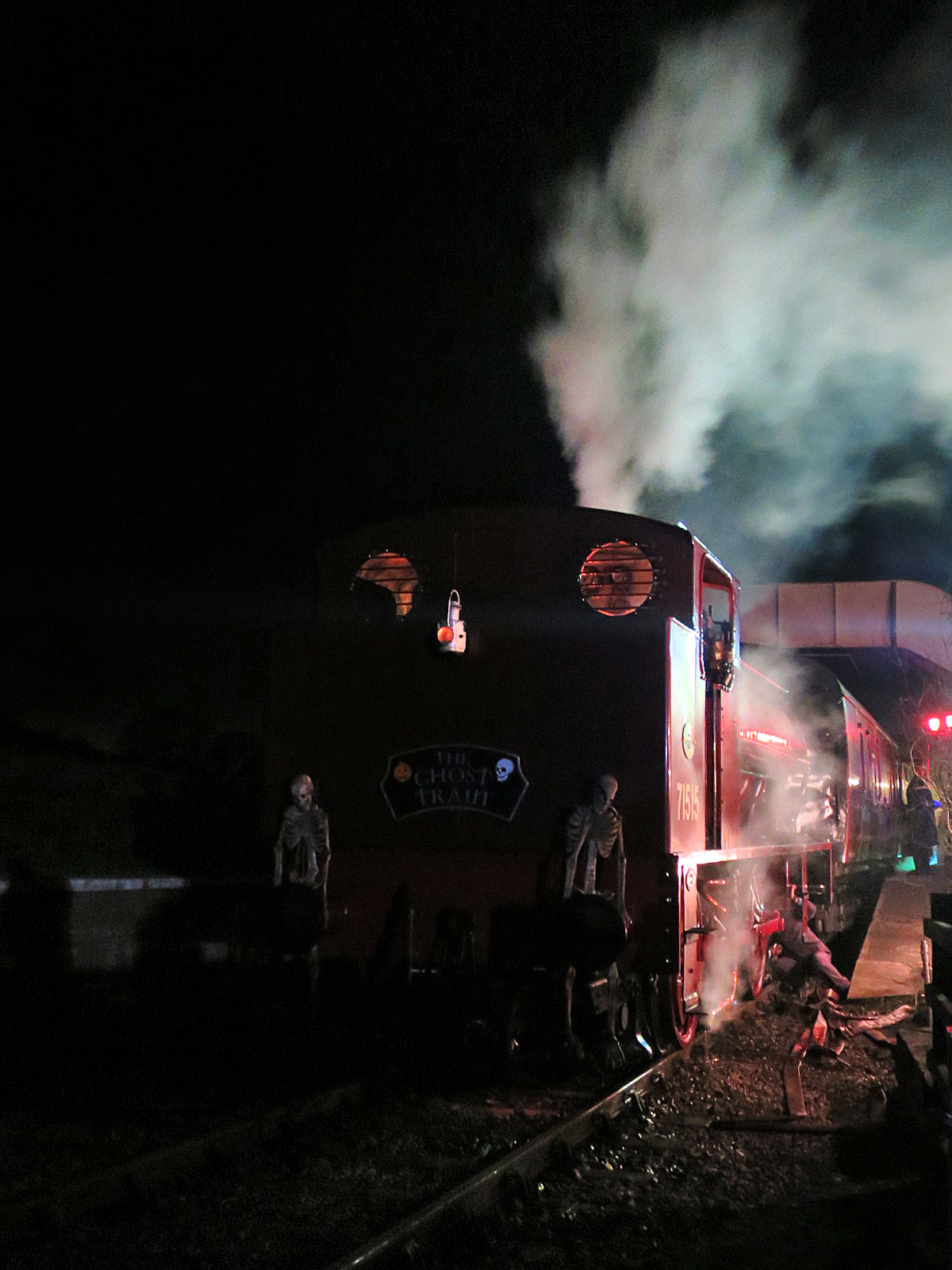
A steam train mocked up as a "ghost train" at the Pontypool and Blaenavon Railway in Wales

In ghostlore, a ghost train is a haunted vehicle in the form of a locomotive or train. The ghost train differs from other traditional forms of haunting in that rather than being a location where ghosts are claimed to be present, "the apparition is the entire train".

== Geographical distribution ==
Ghost trains are reported in many different parts of the world where trains have at some point been prevalent forms of transportation. Accounts of ghost trains have been reported in Canada, Japan, Sweden, the United Kingdom, and in many states of the United States.

=== Canada ===
The St. Louis Ghost Train, better known as the St. Louis Light, is visible at night along an old abandoned rail line between Prince Albert and St. Louis, Saskatchewan. Two local students won an award for investigating and eventually duplicating the phenomenon, which they determined to be caused by the diffraction of distant vehicle lights. A history of the Canadian railways recounts, from a town in Saskatchewan, that "[t]he strange story of a ghost train has been told many times. The site where it occurs is a former railway crossing along a side road around eight kilometres north of the town".

Another Canadian story from May 1908 tells of a ghost train with blinding lights that travelled on non-existent tracks.

=== Japan ===
In Japan, the nisekisha (偽汽車) or yūrei-kikansha (幽霊機関車) is a folk tale of a phantom/counterfeit/ghost steam train involving the tanuki. Such tales were widespread by 1910, and folklorist Kizen Sasaki commented in 1926 that "probably everybody has heard this story somewhere at least once". The earliest instance of the tale that he had been able to trace was from some time between 1879 and 1887, but it had spread as the railways, first arriving in Japan only a few years earlier, had themselves spread across the country.

According to Sasaki, the tales of ghost steam trains are rather humorous, unlike the Japanese folk tales of ghost ships which are more mystical in character. The essence of the folk tale is that steam train drivers would hear the noise of a steam train coming towards them along the track, and they would initially stop to avoid a collision; but they would eventually carry on, when no train arrived, later to find a dead tanuki lying across the tracks. The tale would conclude with a humorous observation such as "of course the tanuki really enjoy imitating things".

According to Michael Dylan Foster, there are many allegorical interpretations of the tale, from industry versus the environment to the foreign versus the native. Its continued popularity, he suggests, was due to a widespread ambivalence on the part of the Japanese populace towards the steam era, on the one hand it providing better transportation, and on the other it destroying or (with the construction of the railway lines) physically reshaping the natural environment and homogenizing society and erasing local differences.

Symbolically, Foster also suggests, the tale can be read as the forces of traditional Japanese views taking a stand, through use of deception and tanuki magical powers of old, against the forces of industrial change and modernity, and ultimately, (in Foster's words) tragically, failing. That the tanuki is overpowered and killed by the train symbolizes not just the futility of opposing the advent of steam trains and concomitant industrialization, but indicates the acceptance of that futility, enshrining it in a folk tale.

This schism between the modern and the industrial and the traditional countryside was reflected in a variant ending of the tale told in a Japanese newspaper on 1889-05-03: "What a surprise that such a thing could occur these days, during the Meiji period."

Foster suggests that this can be taken even further, to the view that the folk tale was an expression of support for the modernity of the steam train era, in the minds of its tellers, emphasizing its inevitability.

Folklorists were reporting tales of phantom tanuki trains still circulating in the 1950s. A variant of the tale that instead involved a phantom motor car, the driver of the opposing motor car expecting a collision only to find a dead tanuki in the road, had appeared some time before it was recorded in 1935 by Daniel Crump Buchanan. Like the steam trains when the folklore about them being imitated by tanuki appeared, the motor car was at that time still new to Japan, the first motor cars having appeared some 20 years earlier.

A similar tale was told in the animated movie Pom Poko (1994), directed by Isao Takahata, where a group of tanuki use illusions and their other traditional magic skills to stop humans from building a new 1960s suburb over the tanuki's home, but ultimately fail in the effort.

=== United States ===
==== Lincoln's Funeral Train ====
A phantom funeral train is said to run regularly from Washington, D.C. to Springfield, Illinois, around the time of the anniversary of Abraham Lincoln's death, stopping watches and clocks in surrounding areas as it passes.

Louis C. Jones, folklorist and then associate professor of English at New York State College for Teachers, recounted in 1945 a New York tale of the ghost of Lincoln's Funeral Train, which he discovered had been recorded at least a generation earlier by Lloyd Lewis, Chicago newspaperman and author of Myths after Lincoln, recounted in an Albany newspaper. According to the 1945 version of the tale, the ghost train could be seen one day every April travelling up the Harlem Division, with all clocks stopping whilst the train (actually two trains, the first with a ghostly band playing soundless instruments and the second with a flatcar carrying a coffin) passes by. He noted that in the earlier version of the tale, the train travelled on the New York Central Railroad up the Hudson Division, which would have been the correct route.

==== In other states ====
There are several ghost train folklore in various states.

A collection of Louisiana folklore notes of a road in Baton Rouge, Louisiana, "the lights of a ghost train are also said to appear on the old bridge occasionally. Its shrill, lonely whistle has been heard many times around the bridge".

In Iredell County, North Carolina, a ghost train was reputed to pass through the area, with local legend holding that a train that had wrecked on the spot in 1891 "plays out that deadly scene again on each anniversary of the wreck", with signs including "grinding metal, screaming passengers and a watchman's light". In August 2010, 29-year-old Christopher Kaiser was struck and killed by a real locomotive while with a group of people waiting in the vicinity of the tracks to hear the ghost train.

San Antonio, Texas has tales about a bus crash where the victims were forced to traverse the railway and perished. They are alleged to haunt the railroad tracks.

=== Sweden ===
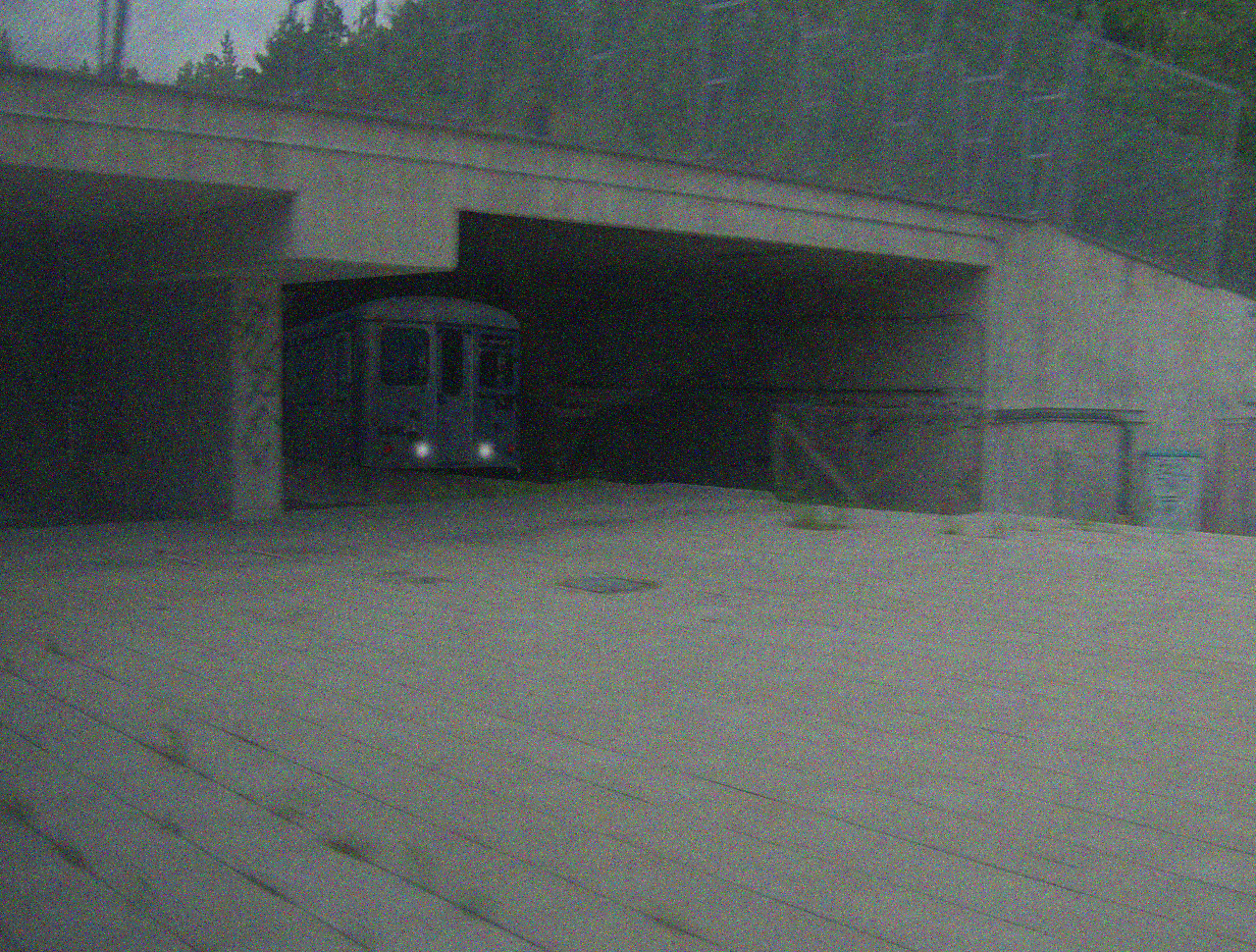
Artist's impression of the Silver Train at Kymlinge ghost station, "the metro station for the dead" (photoshopped image).

The Silver Train of Stockholm (Silverpilen) is a ghost train which features in several Swedish urban legends alleging sightings of a silver colored metro train in the Stockholm Metro. Many of these urban legends are link this train with the unfinished Kymlinge ghost station.

== Bibliography ==
- Foster, Michael Dylan (2012). "Haunting Modernity: Tanuki, Trains, and Transformation in Japan". Asian Ethnology. 71 (1): 3–29.
- Johnson, T. W. (1974). "Far Eastern Fox Lore". Asian Folklore Studies. 33 (1). Nanzan University: 35–68. doi:10.2307/1177503. JSTOR 1177503.
- Casal, U. A. (1959). "The Goblin Fox and Badger and Other Witch Animals of Japan". Folklore Studies. 18. Nanzan University: 1–93. doi:10.2307/1177429. JSTOR 1177429.
- Jones, Louis C. (April 1945). "Some historic ghosts of New York". New York History. 26 (2). Cornell University Press: 177–188. JSTOR 23149565.
- Swayne, Matthew L. (2019). Haunted Rails: Tales of Ghost Trains, Phantom Conductors, and Other Railroad Spirits. Llewellyn Publications. ISBN 978-0738761336.
