= Kymlinge =

Area and a ghost metro station in Stockholm

Coordinates: 59°23′40″N 17°57′54″E

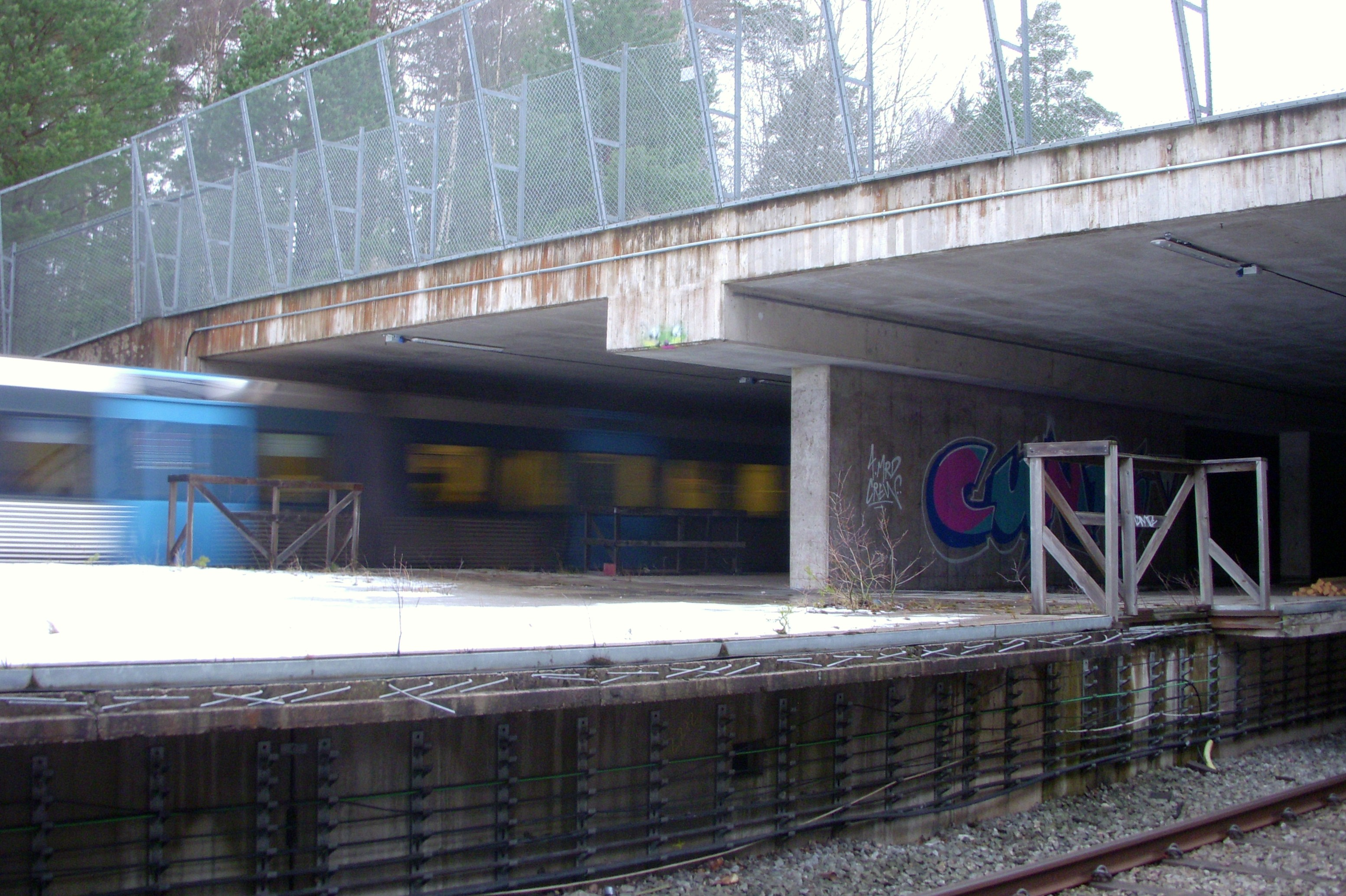
The open-sky part of Kymlinge metro station.

Kymlinge (Swedish pronunciation: [ˈɕʏ̂mlɪŋɛ]) is an area of Sundbyberg Municipality, Stockholm County, Sweden. It is mostly a recreational park, part of which is a nature reserve (Igelbäcken).

== History ==
The area has been inhabited since the Iron Age. The name is known since 1347, then as Kymmelinghe. Until the beginning of the 20th century, the area was still used as a farm. Since the farm was abandoned, the area has been kept as a park.

In the 1970s there were plans to develop the area as a suburb, mainly to accommodate government agencies, state-owned enterprises and other offices moving out from central Stockholm (they needed larger offices). The plans were eventually scrapped, for several reasons. The suburbanisation of Stockholm had already peaked, and some government agencies were instead relocated to other cities in Sweden. Also, the municipality (which is the smallest in Sweden by area) wanted to preserve the area as a nature resort, so it was left untouched.

Plans to develop the area are discussed every few years, especially around elections.

== Metro station ==
In the early 1970s, the planning of a Metro station in Kymlinge, located between Hallonbergen and Kista stations, on the blue line to Akalla, was already well advanced. The transit authority Storstockholms Lokaltrafik decided to go on with the building, but the station was left unfinished, and the Metro line was opened in 1977 without Kymlinge station as part of it. Today, the station is a half-built testament to halted development, though the very active Blue Line still runs through it and trains regularly pass by, with the unfinished station visible to passengers. If the area is ever developed in the future, it will be possible to carry on with the work. At the beginning of the 21st century such plans were again discussed.

Kymlinge is sometimes called a "ghost station" or an "abandoned station", but the fact is that the project has simply been put off indefinitely. The station is said to be haunted by the Silver Train of Stockholm, a ghost train.

== See also ==
- North End tube station - never-opened station on the London Underground.
- Haxo - a never-opened station on the Paris Metro
- Porte Molitor - never-opened station on the Paris Métro.
- The Silver Train of Stockholm, the "ghost train" of the Stockholm Metro, sometimes associated with Kymlinge
- The Philip K. Dick short story "The Commuter" involving a station called "Macon Heights".
- Ryugyong Hotel, of Pyongyang, a hotel office project that stood incomplete for a decade, once featured on North Korean propaganda, such as stamps etc., airbrushed out, dubbing it the Phantom hotel.
