= SL C20 =

Subway train used in the Stockholm Metro

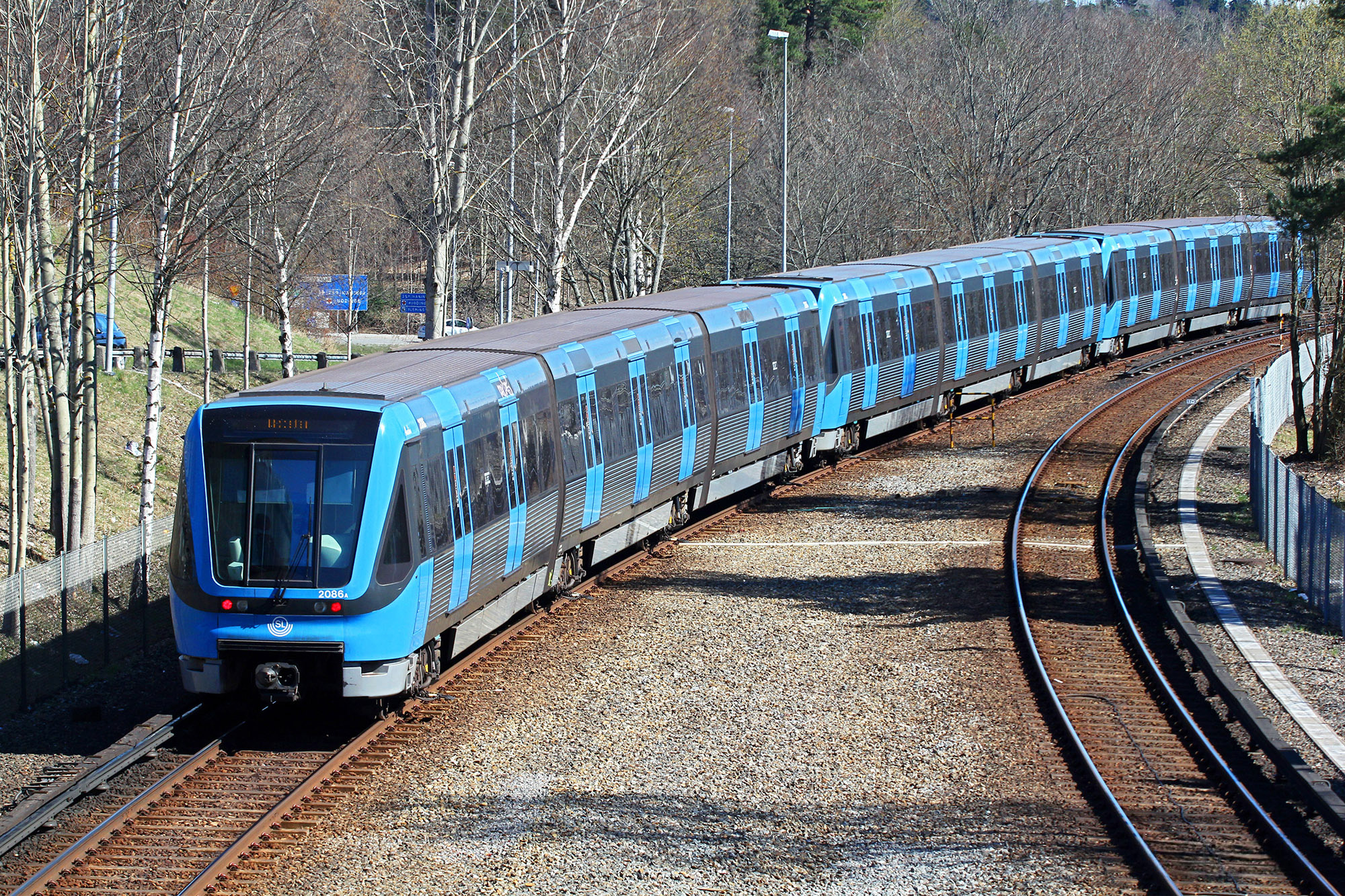
- A C20 train on the Red Line to Ropsten

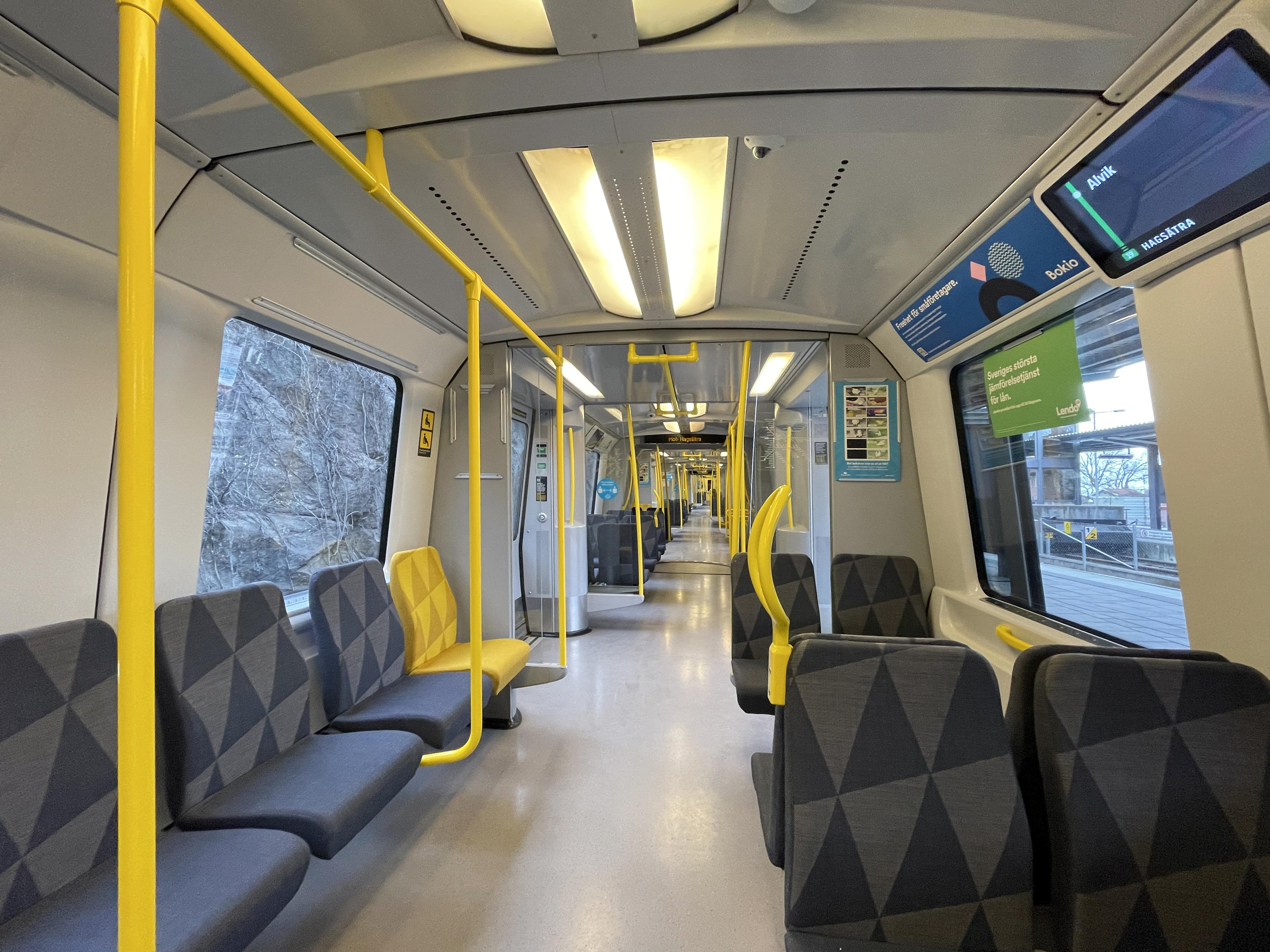
- The interior of a refurbished C20
- In service: 10 May 1998 – present
- Manufacturer: Adtranz/Bombardier Transportation
- Built at: Kalmar Verkstad, Kalmar, Sweden
- Family name: Movia
- Replaced: All C2, C3, C4, C6 and C8
- Constructed: 1997-2004
- Refurbished: 2019–2023 at Bombardier/Alstom Västerås, Västmanland
- Number built: C20: 810 carriages (270 sets); C20F: 3 carriages (1 set)
- Number in service: C20: 810 carriages (270 sets); C20F: 3 carriages (1 set)
- Formation: 3 cars (A-C-B) per unit, 2-3 units per train
- Fleet numbers: 2000 (C20F); 2001–2270 (C20)
- Capacity: 126 seated, 288 (Note: 317 for C20F) standing
- Operator: Connecting Stockholm (under contract from Storstockholms Lokaltrafik)
- Depots: Hammarby, Högdalen, Norsborg, Nyboda, Rissne, Vällingby
- Line served: All Stockholm Metro lines

Specifications
- Car body construction: Stainless steel
- Train length: 46.5 m (152 ft 6 45/64 in)
- Width: 2.9 m (9 ft 6 11/64 in)
- Height: 3.68 m (12 ft 7/8 in)
- Platform height: 1.15 m (3 ft 9 1/4 in)
- Doors: 2 per side (end cars); 3 per side (intermediate car)
- Wheel diameter: 825–750 mm (32.5–29.5 in) (new–worn)
- Maximum speed: 90 km/h (56 mph) (design); 80 km/h (50 mph) (Red and Blue lines; service); 70 km/h (43 mph) (Green line; service)
- Weight: 67 t (66 long tons; 74 short tons)
- Traction system: Bombardier MITRAC TC1410 IGBT–VVVF (as built); Bombardier MITRAC TC1500 SiC–VVVF (2017-2018 trial)
- Traction motors: 8 × ABB MJA 220-1 125 kW (168 hp) asynchronous 3-phase AC
- Power output: 1 MW (1,300 hp)
- HVAC: Forced-air ventilation with driver's compartment air-conditioning and heater (C20); Air-conditioning and heater (C20F)
- Electric systems: 650–750 V DC third rail
- Current collection: Contact shoe
- UIC classification: Bo′+Bo′Bo′+Bo′
- Bogies: Bombardier FLEXX Eco 505x
- Safety system: ATC/ATO
- Coupling system: Dellner
- Track gauge: 1,435 mm (4 ft 8 1/2 in) standard gauge

The SL C20 is a type of subway train used in the Stockholm Metro in Sweden. Between 1997 and 2004, 271 3-car sets, numbered 2000–2270, were delivered to Stockholm by the former Kalmar Verkstad, owned by Adtranz, later acquired by Bombardier Transportation. The C20 is a completely new design and therefore is not compatible with other train types in the system. At 46.5 metres (152 ft 6 3/4 in), each carriage is longer than the previous train types. To save cost and weight, each unit has only four bogies. The middle car has two bogies. The end parts consist of one bogie each and are connected to the central portion via a semi-trailer-direction. Trolley subframes are made of stainless steel, and are less susceptible to corrosion.

The first new rolling stock type for the Stockholm Metro since the C14 and C15 stock from the mid-1980s, the C20 was at launch advertised as the Vagn 2000 (English: Wagon 2000) and marketed as the subway car of the future, though the only customer outside of Stockholm would be the Bucharest Metro, with an order for 18 MOVIA 346 trains that would be based upon the C20 in 1999, with an additional 26 units later in 2004. All C20 coaches have been given their own names, all proposed by private individuals. Many of the names are linked to Stockholm; for example, coach no. 2012 was christened Estelle, after the christening of Princess Estelle.

== Refurbishment ==
The C20F and the 270 3-car C20 sets underwent a mid-life refurbishment at the Alstom (formerly Bombardier Transportation) factory in Västerås, Västmanland between 2019 and 2023. During this period, the refurbished sets were referred to as C20U or C25. The refurbishment increased the standing capacity of all sets by converting one side of each car to all-longitudinal seating instead of the all-transverse seating currently in use (similar to the C1 and C30), as well as removing a portion of seats in each end of a carriage to create spaces for wheelchairs and strollers. All seat upholstery were replaced and new yellow upholstery to designate priority seating were also introduced, and each refurbished C20 set was retrofitted with 16 CCTV cameras, an increase of 6 such cameras in each car prior to refurbishment.

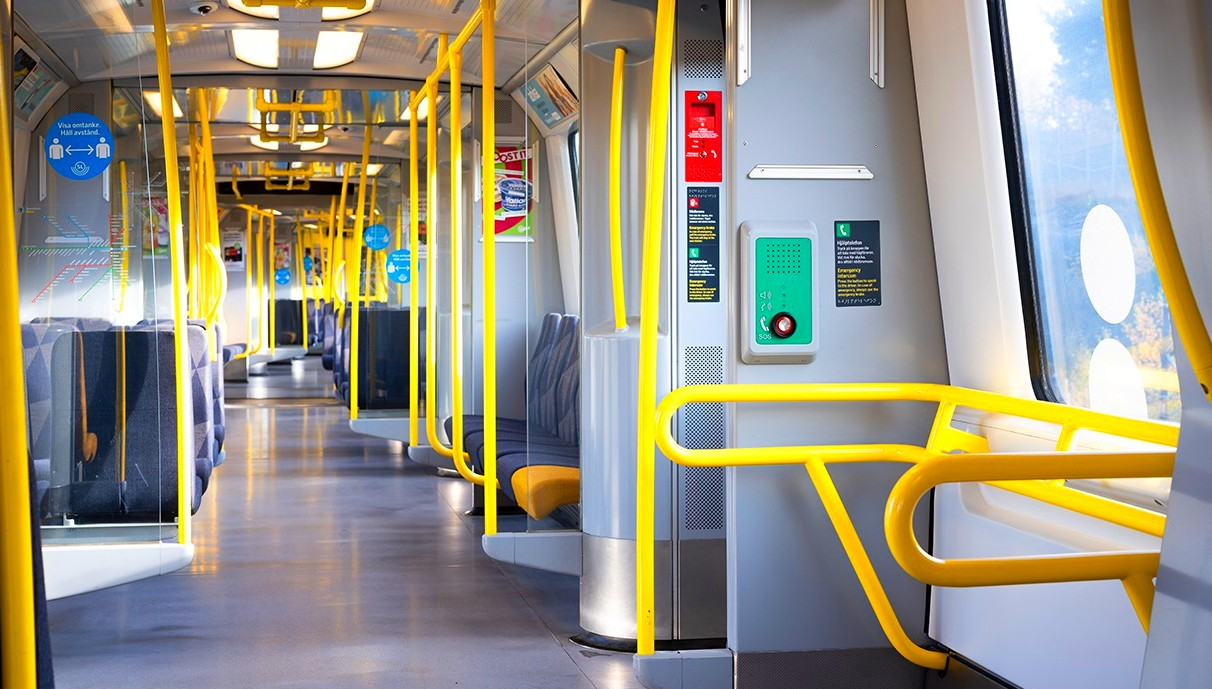

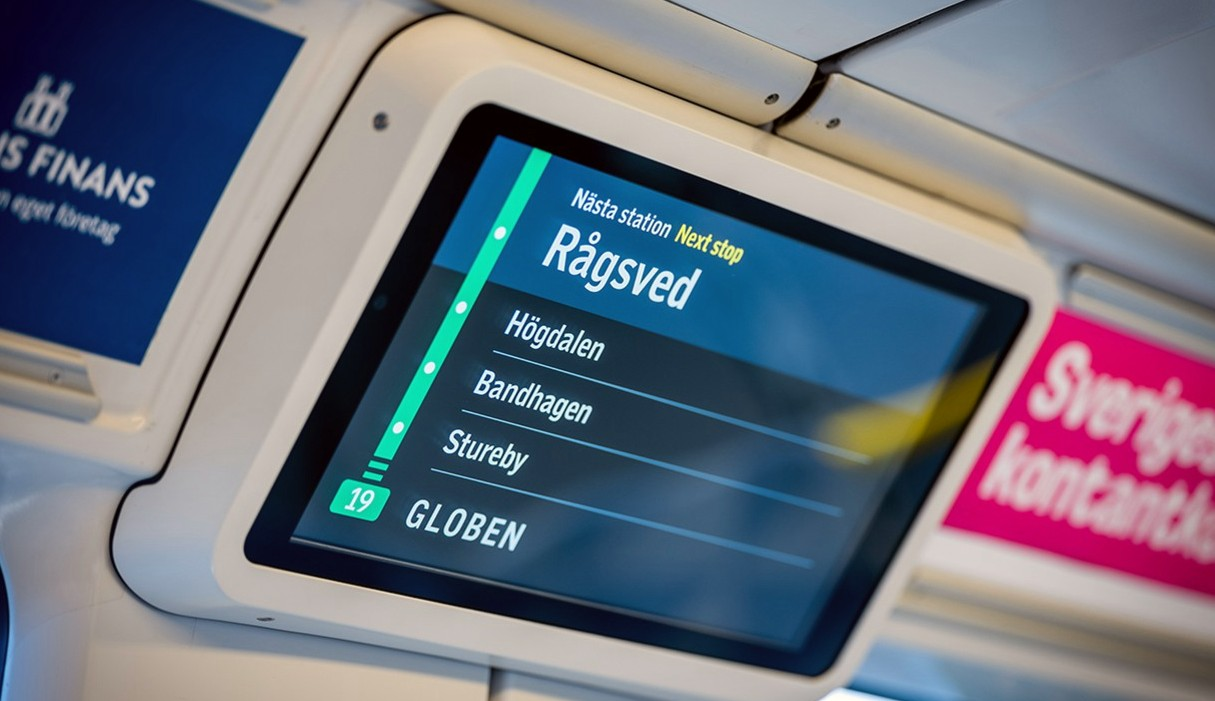

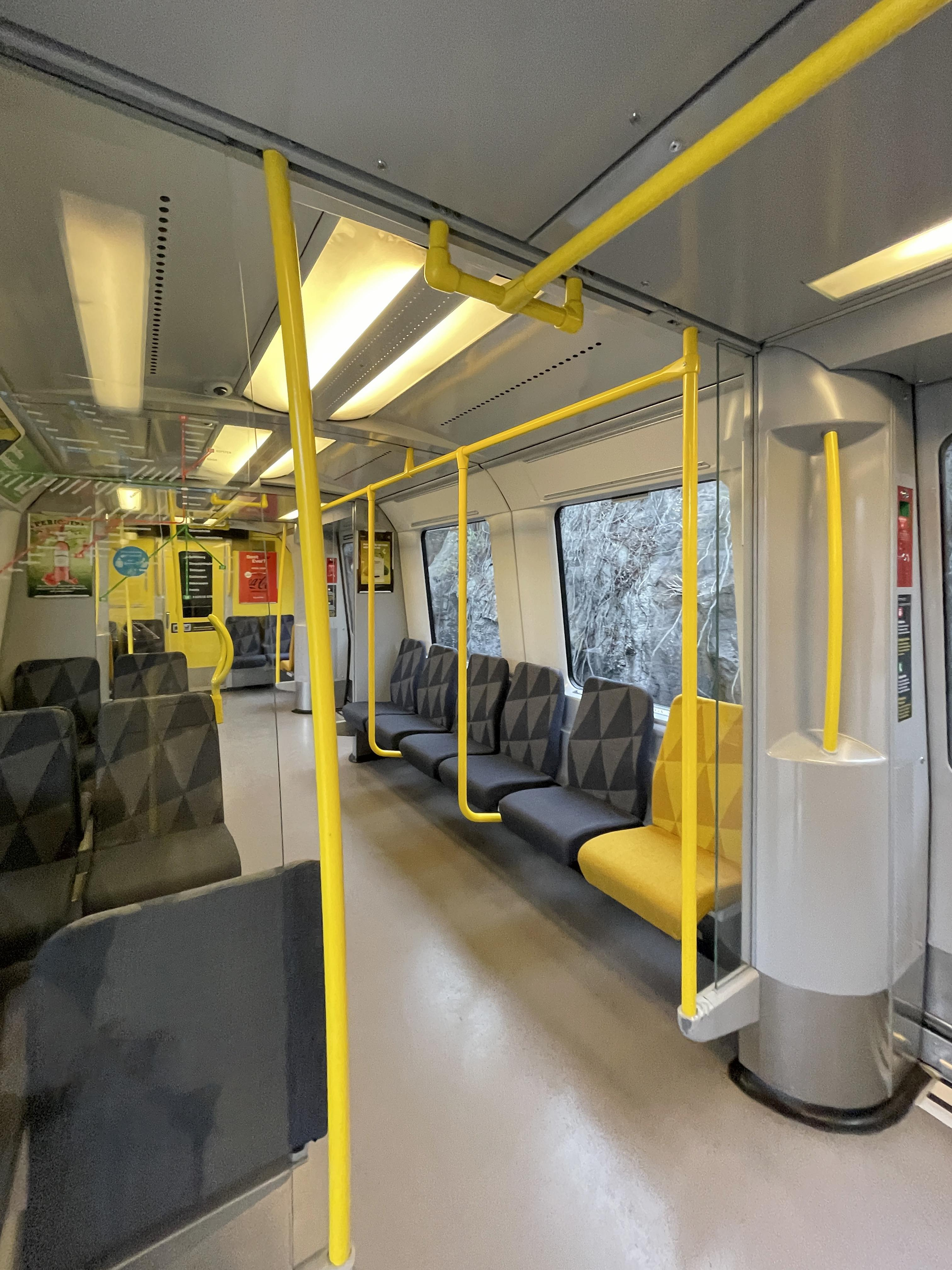

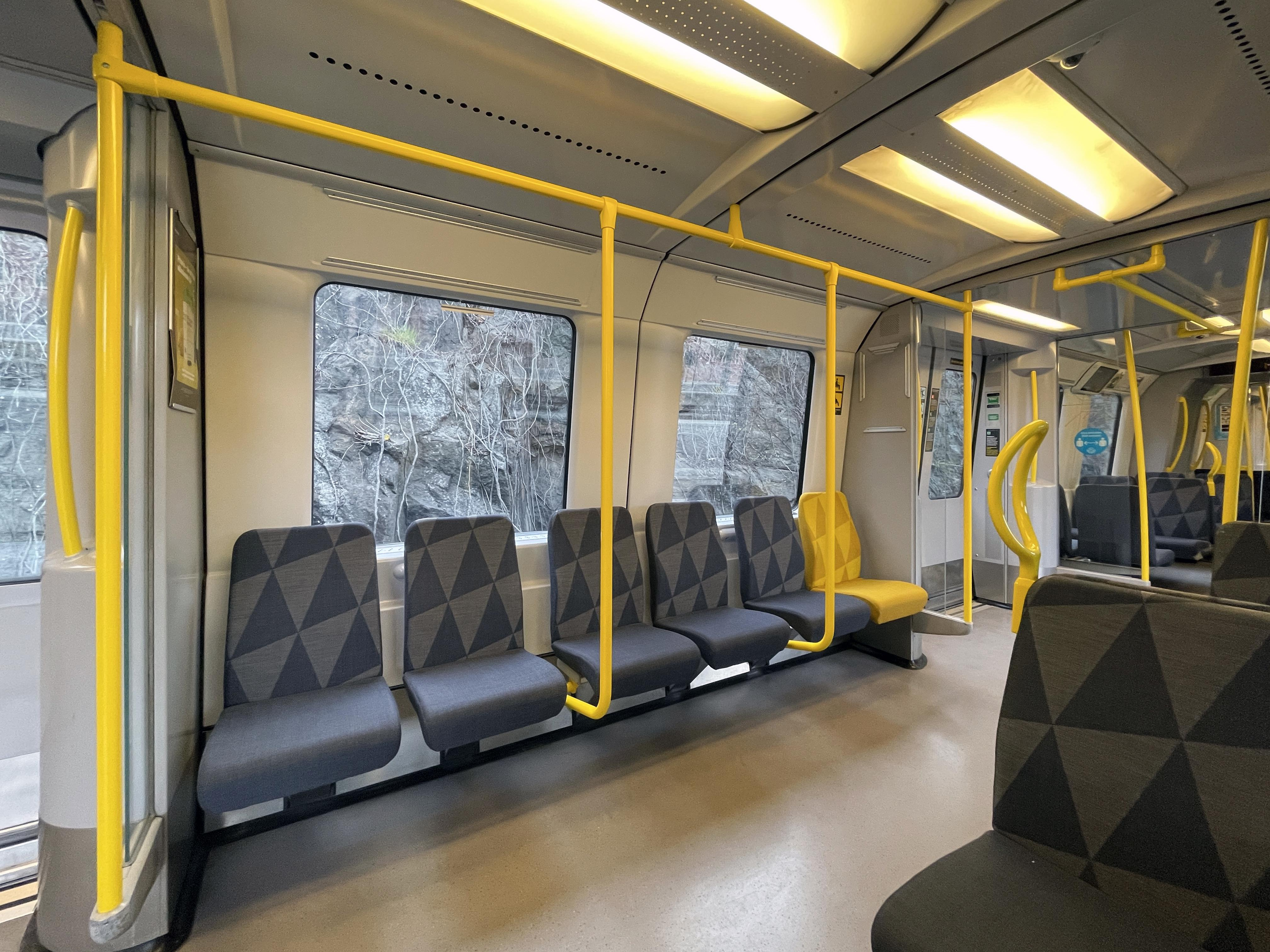

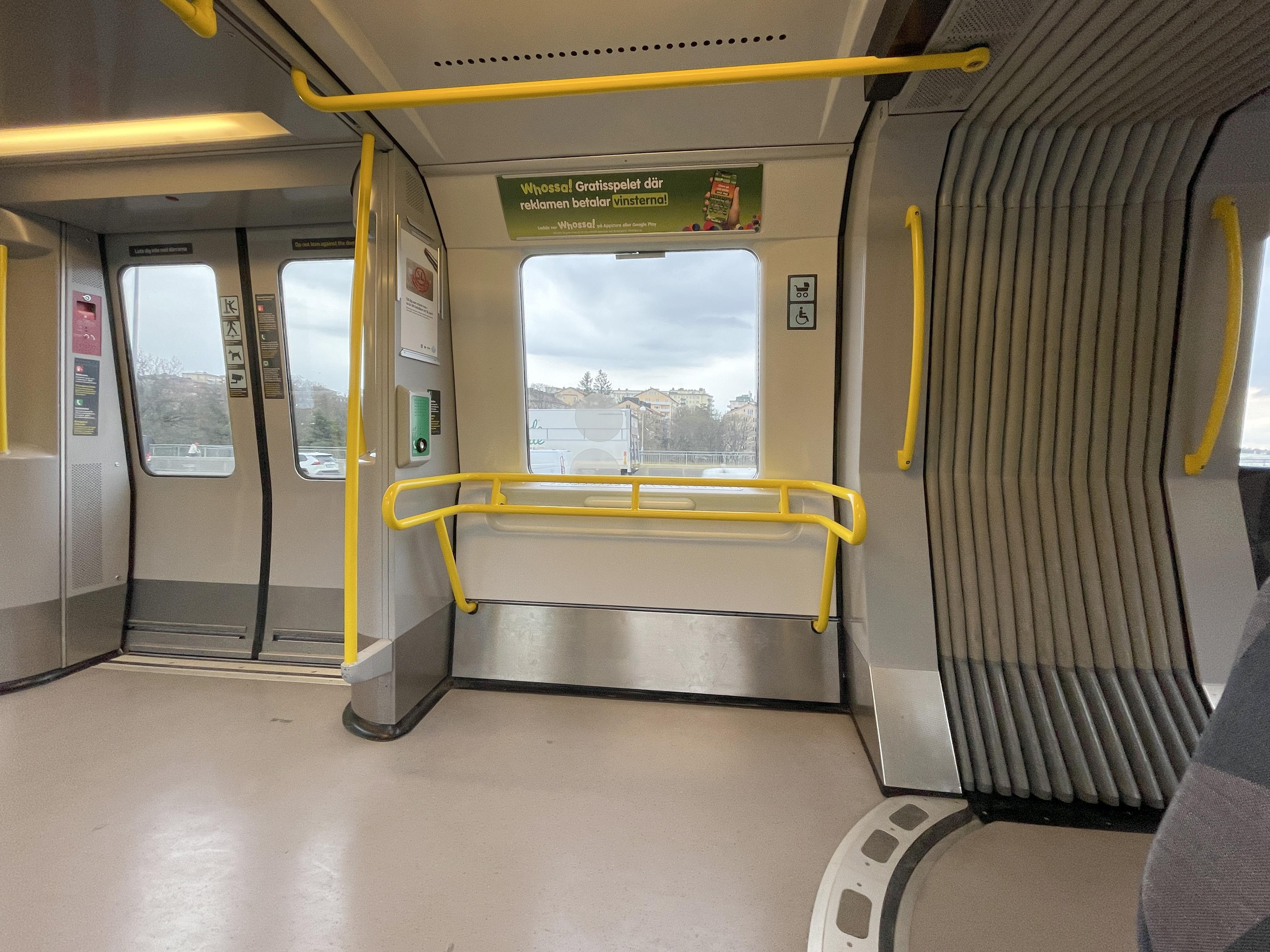

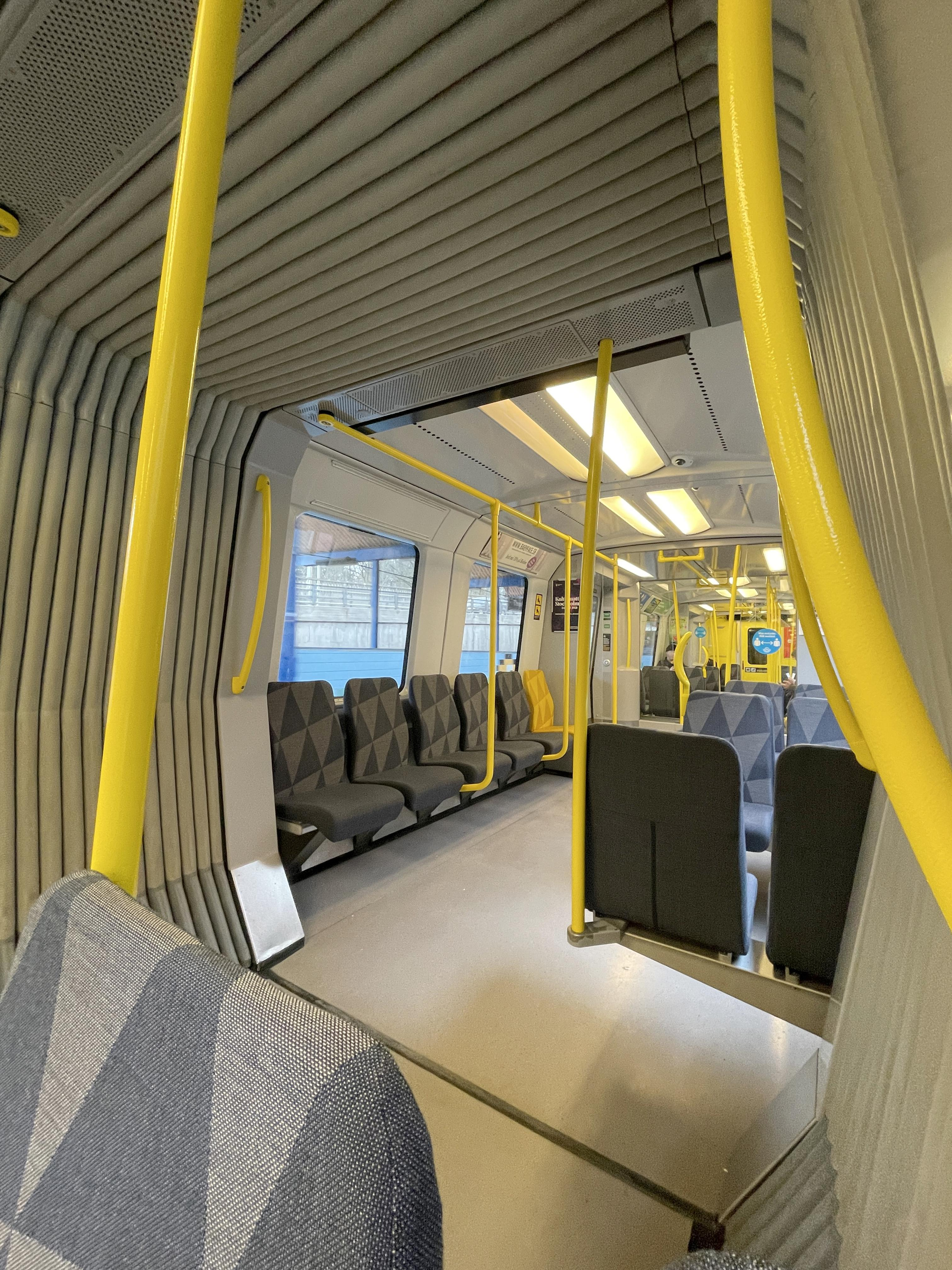

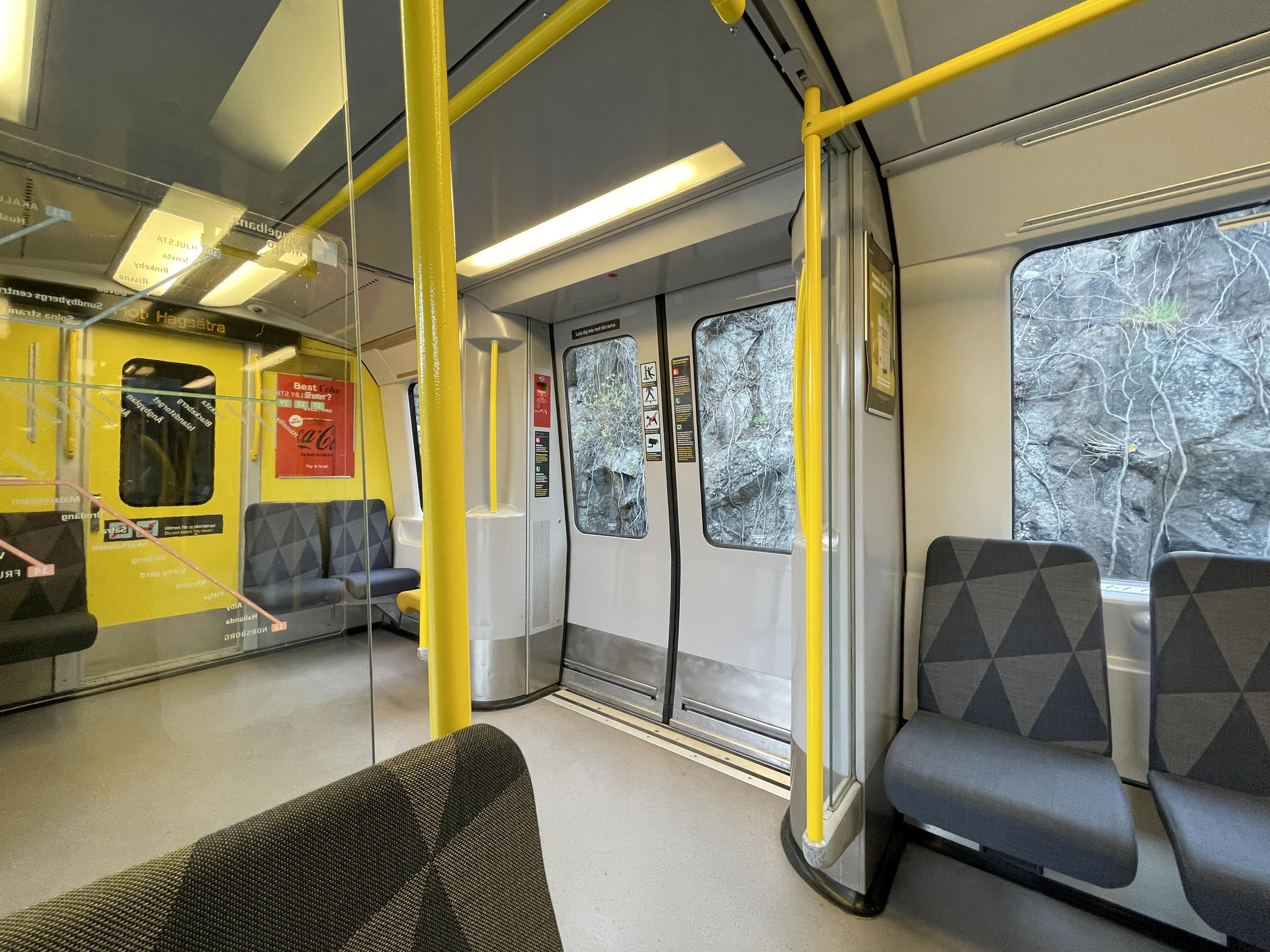

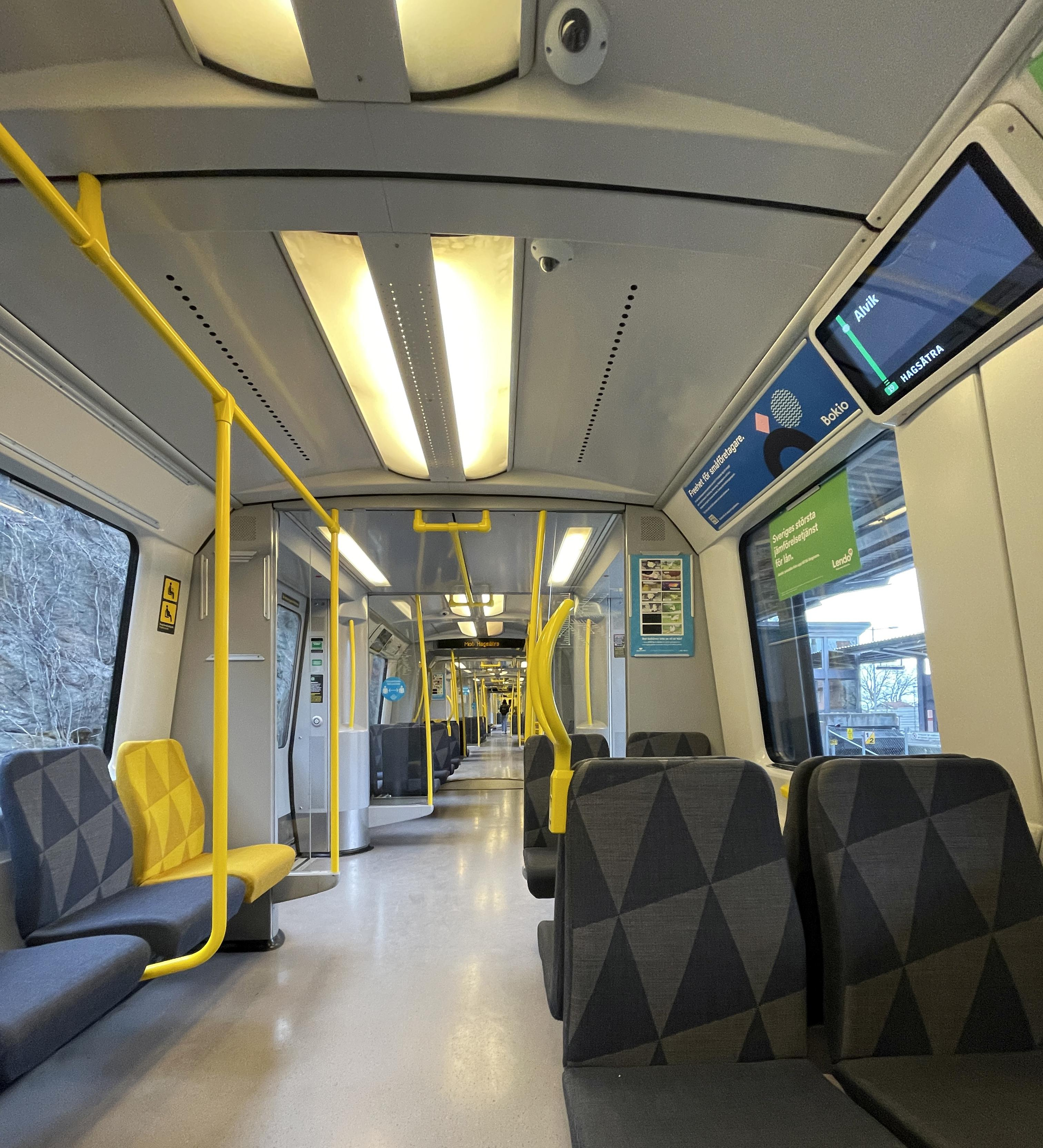

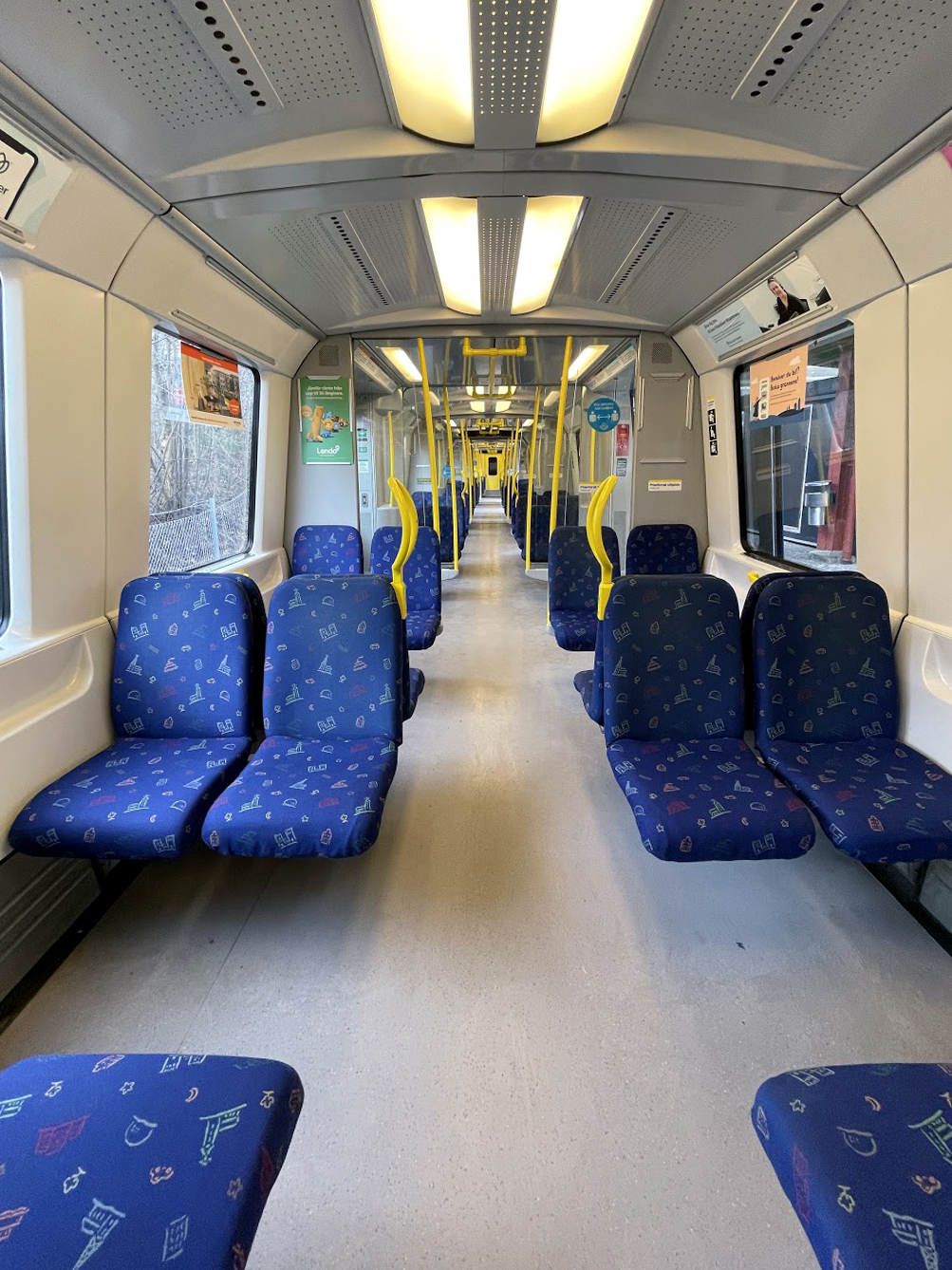

== C20F ==
The C20F is a related prototype, built with "FICAS" technology – a highly innovative modular construction that uses a stainless steel skin bonded to a rigid composite core. This construction results in an extremely thin wall (25mm instead of the C20's 100mm), thereby creating a more spacious interior without altering the outer profile.

The C20F has air conditioning in both the driver's cab and the passenger compartments, whereas the C20 has air conditioning in the driver's cab only. The exterior of the C20F differs by having smooth trolley sub-frames instead of the corrugated trolley sub-frames present in the C20.

The C20F car assigned set 2000 and originally christened Incognito, then rechristened Elvira on 22 May 2012, when C20 set 2012, previously christened Elvira, was rechristened the Estelle on the occasion of Princess Estelle's baptism.

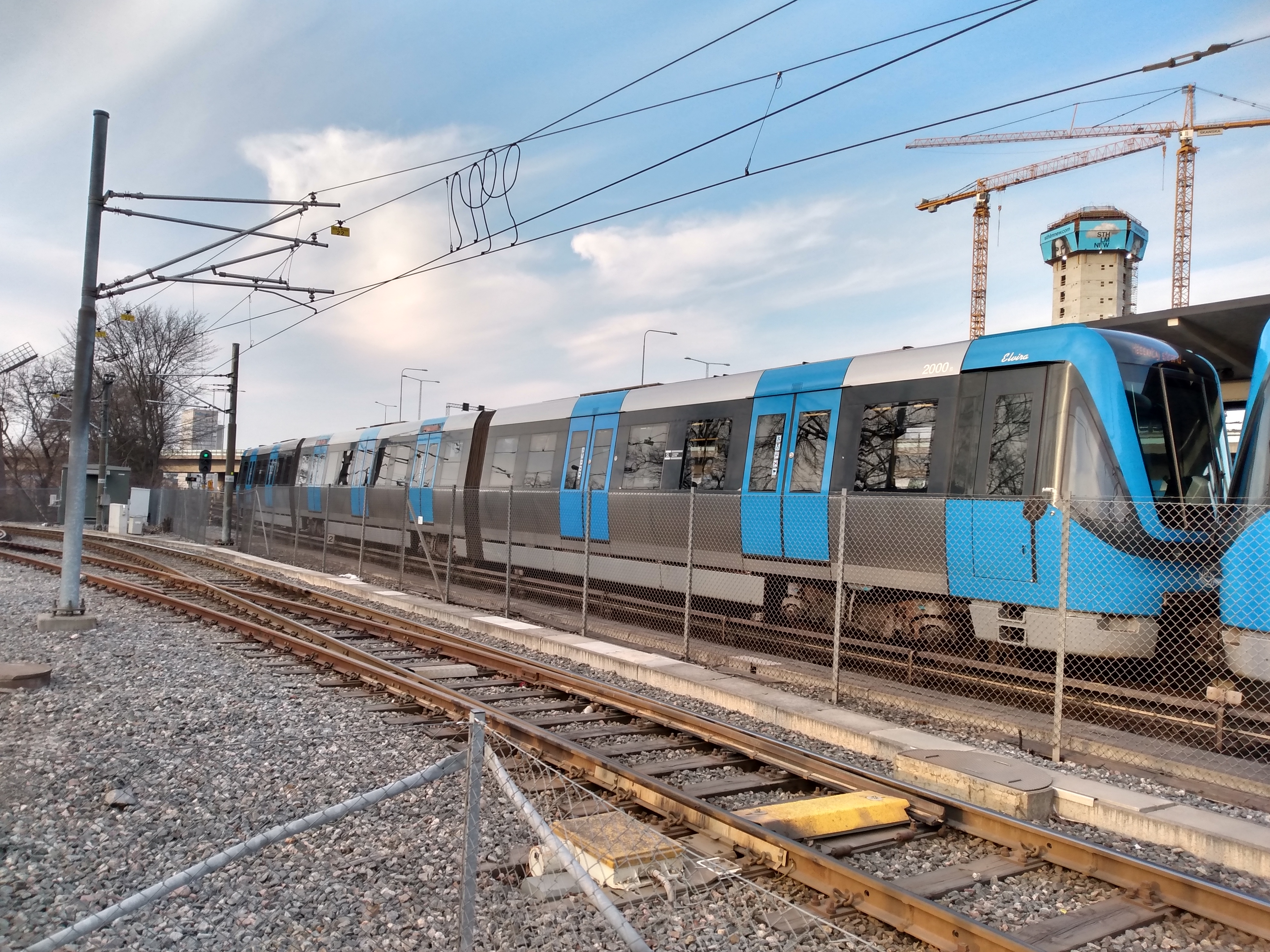
The C20F train at Gullmarsplan

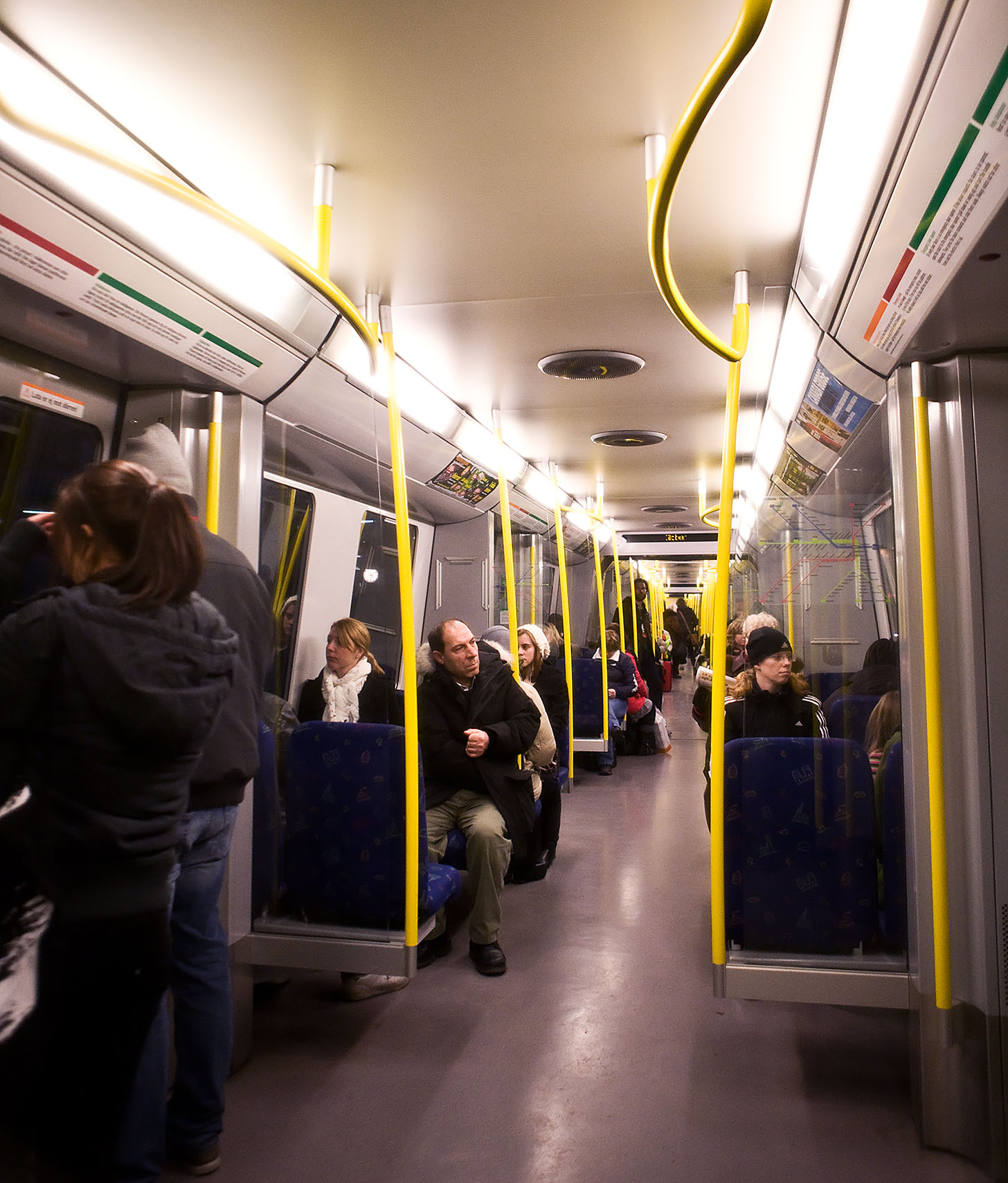
C20F original interior

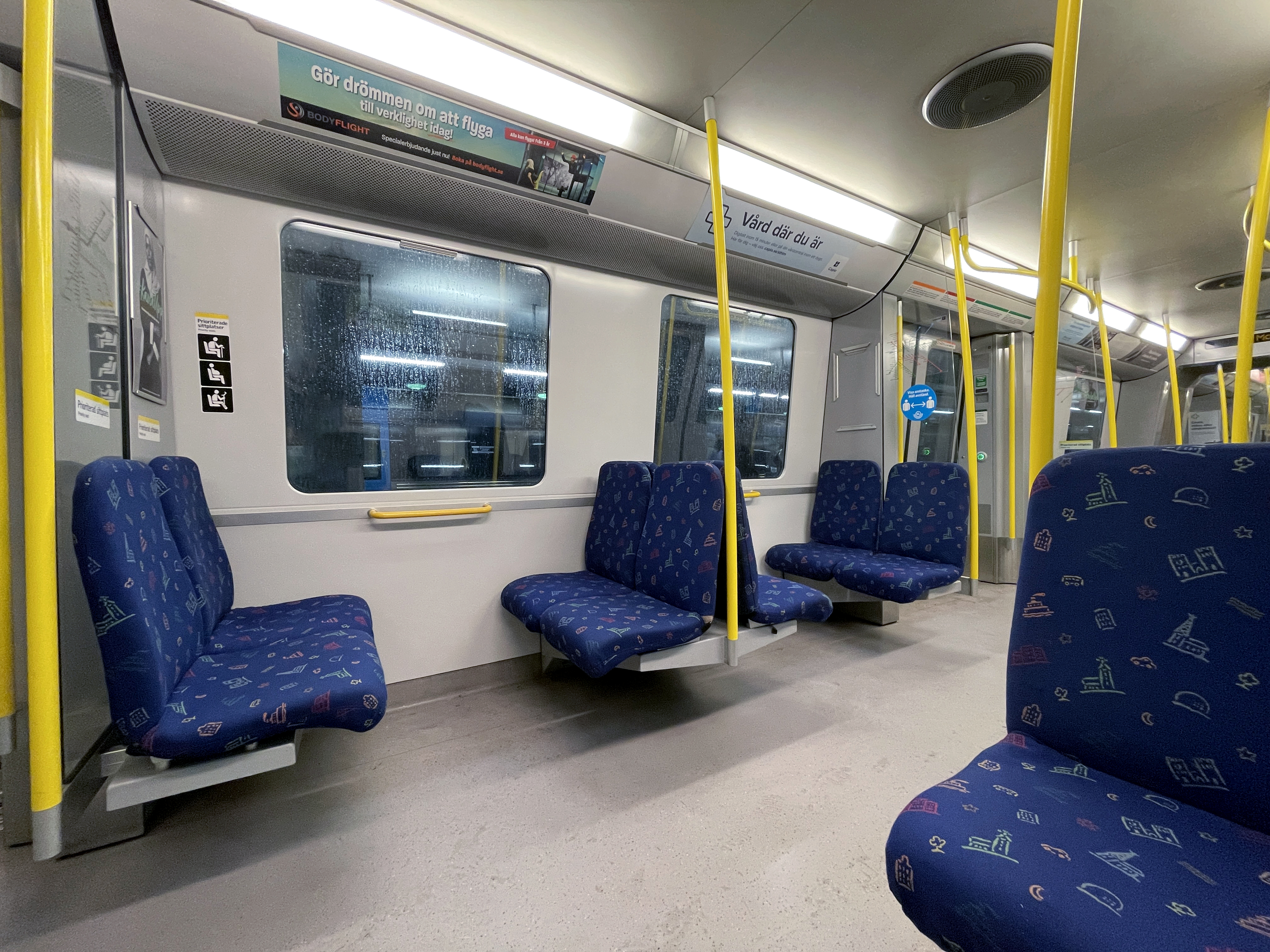
C20F refurbished interior

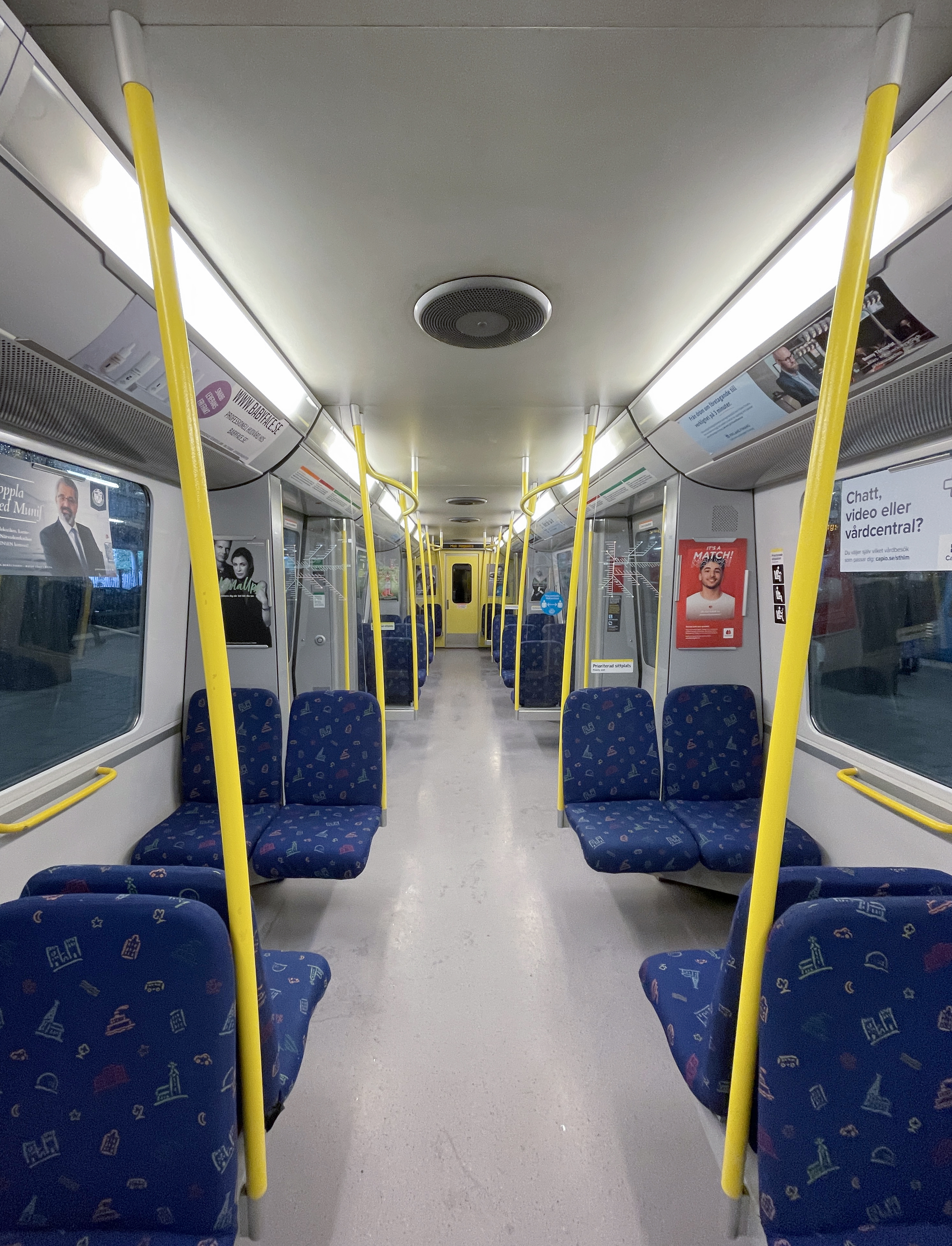
C20F refurbished interior

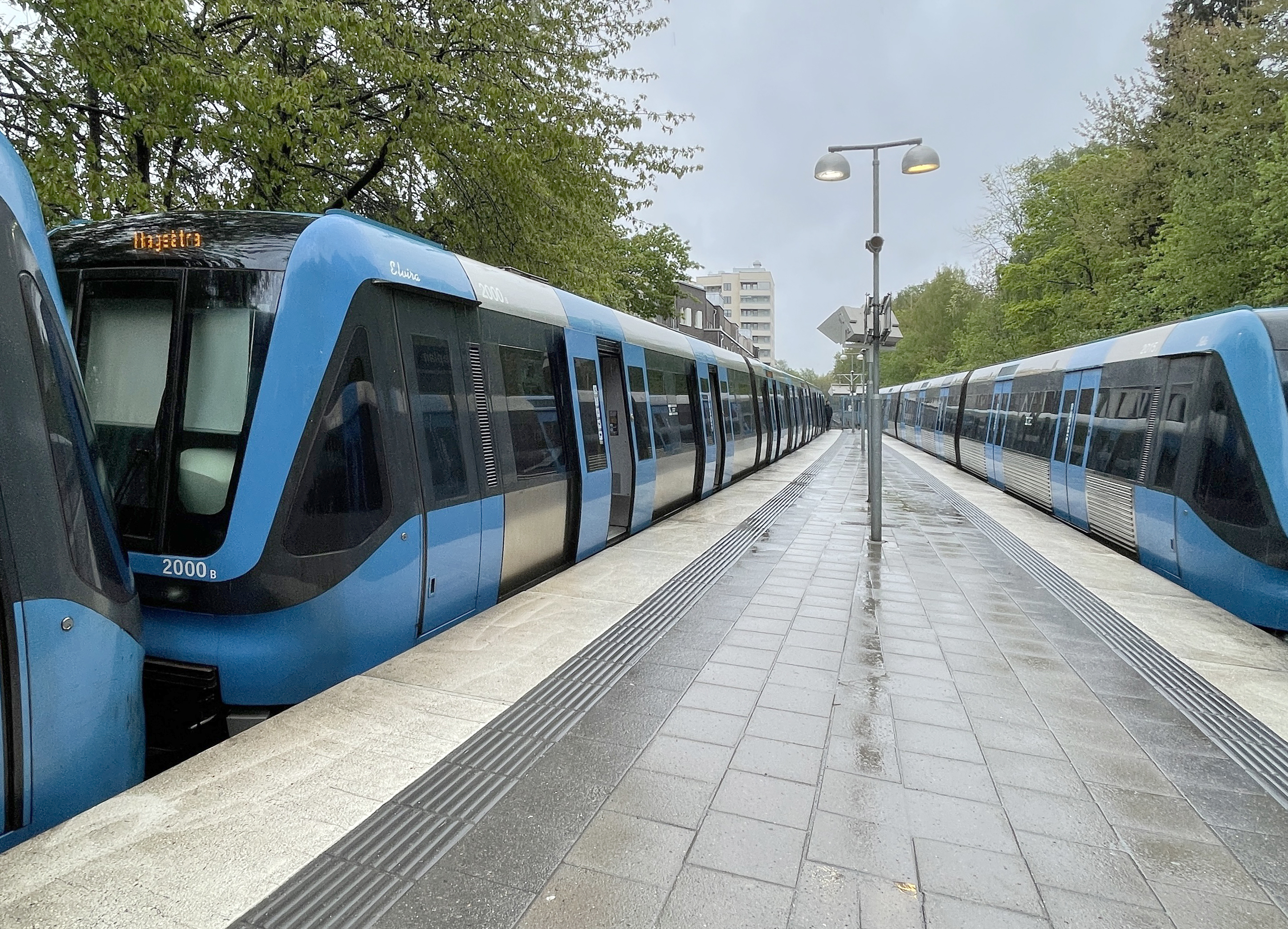
C20F side-by-side with C20
