= Blåsut metro station =

Stockholm Metro station

Blåsut
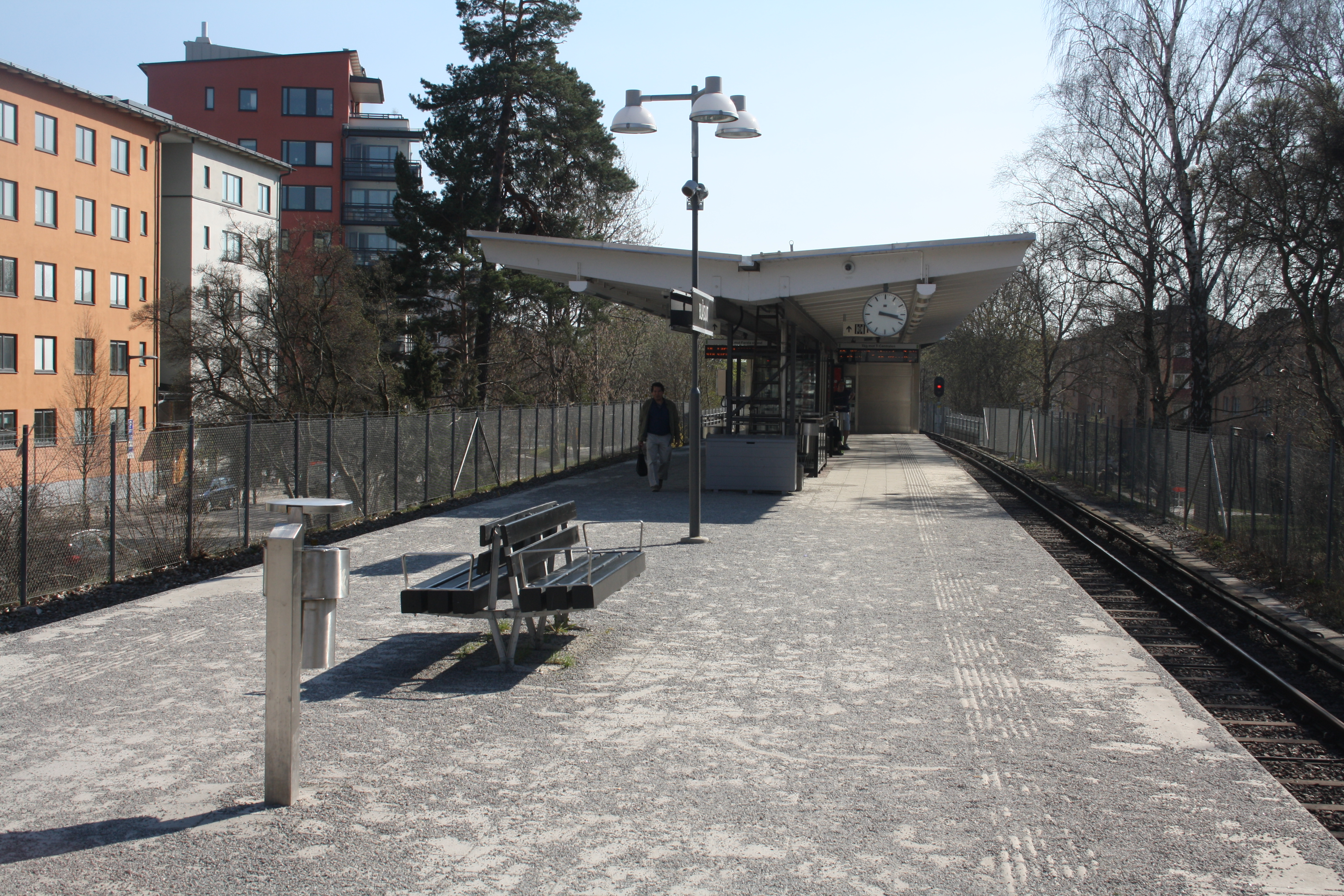

General information
- Coordinates: 59°17′24″N 18°05′27″E
- System: Stockholm Metro station
- Owner: Storstockholms Lokaltrafik
- Platforms: 1 island platform
- Tracks: 2

Construction
- Structure type: Embankment
- Accessible: Yes

Other information
- Station code: BLU

History
- Opened: 1 October 1950; 75 years ago

Passengers
- 2019: 3,800 boarding per weekday

Services
Preceding station	Stockholm Metro	Following station
Skärmarbrink towards Alvik	Line 18	Sandsborg towards Farsta strand
Location
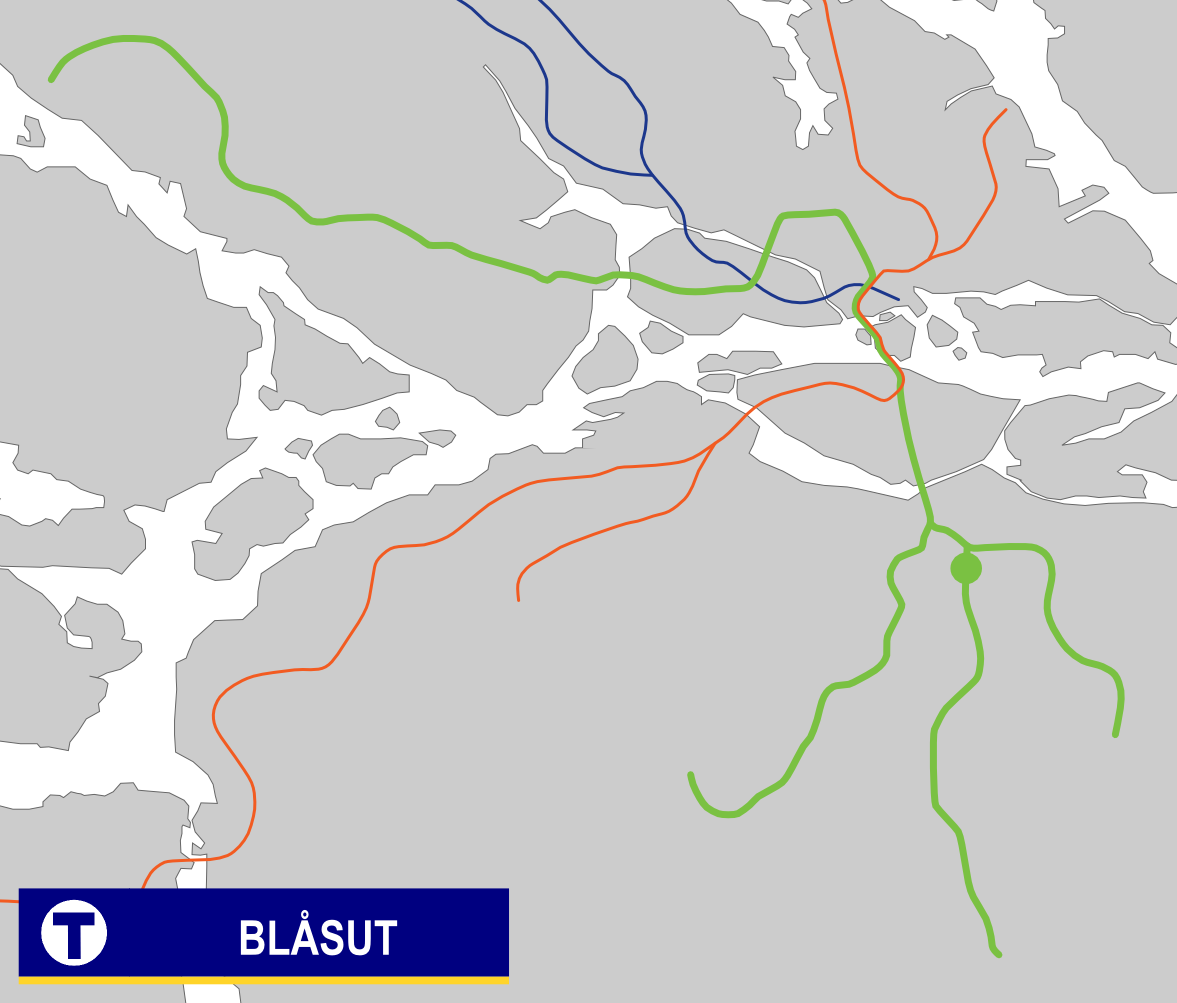

Blåsut metro station is a station on the Green Line (line 18, Farsta strand–Alvik) of the Stockholm Metro, located in Blåsut ("Blowout"), Johanneshov, Söderort. The station was on the first metro line (from Slussen south to Hökarängen) and opened on 1 October 1950. It is 3.6 km (2.2 mi) from Slussen. It is an outdoor station with a platform and with a ticket hall at the southern end.

The name is taken from a tavern that was located at a forest ranger's residence, the current Blåsutvägen. Blåsut was during the 19th century a common name for windy and windy places.

In 2008, the station's artistic decoration, carried out by Ann Edholm, was inaugurated, with elements such as "speed lines", made of black and white tiles, as well as "an abstract composition, which can associate to a face".
