= Skärmarbrink metro station =

Stockholm Metro station

Skärmarbrink
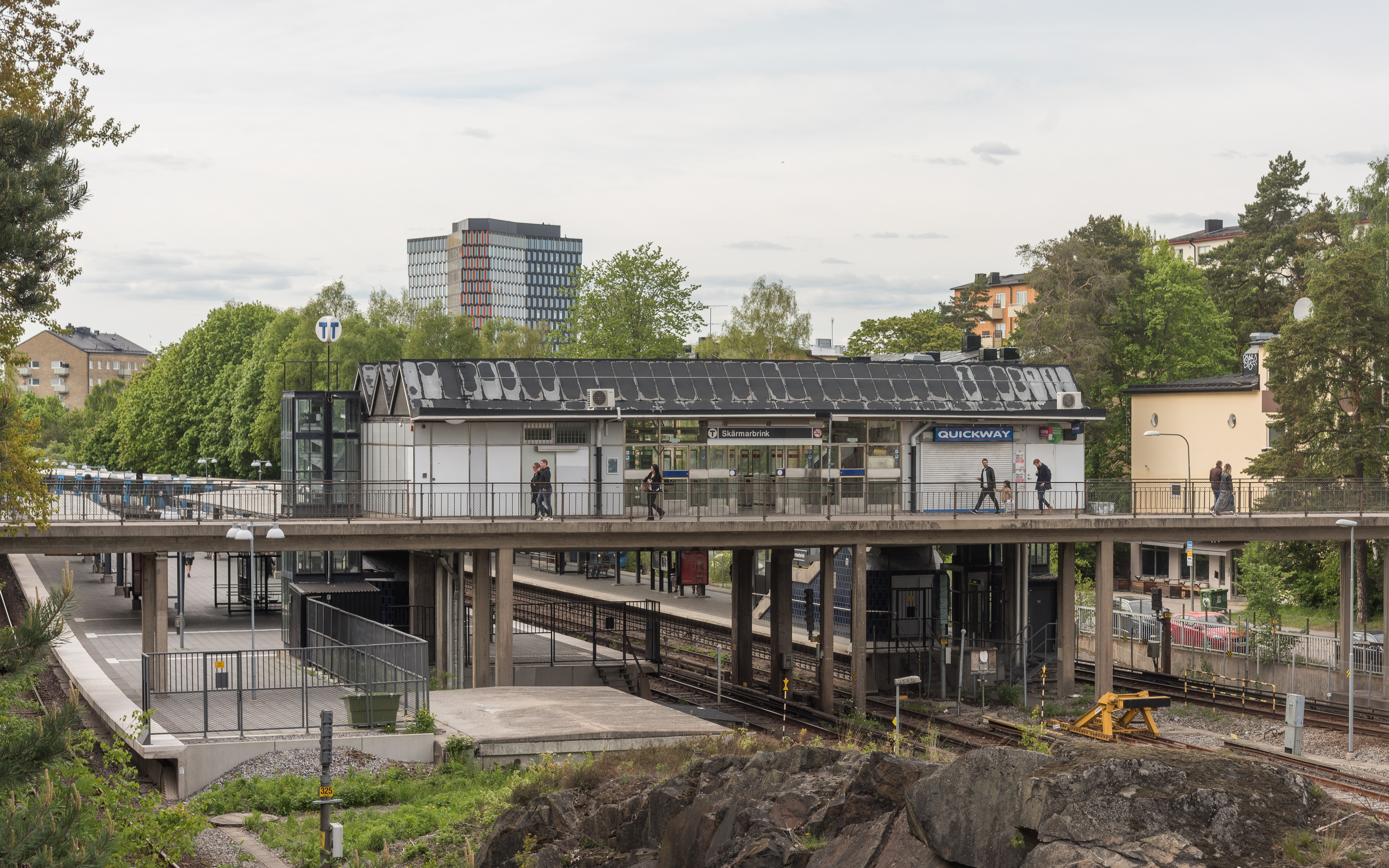

General information
- Coordinates: 59°17′43″N 18°05′24″E
- System: Stockholm Metro station
- Owner: Storstockholms Lokaltrafik
- Platforms: 2 island platforms
- Tracks: 4

Construction
- Structure type: At grade
- Accessible: Yes

Other information
- Station code: SKB

History
- Opened: 1 October 1950; 75 years ago

Passengers
- 2019: 5,400 boarding per weekday

Services
Preceding station	Stockholm Metro	Following station
Gullmarsplan towards Åkeshov	Line 17	Hammarbyhöjden towards Skarpnäck
Gullmarsplan towards Alvik	Line 18	Blåsut towards Farsta strand
Location
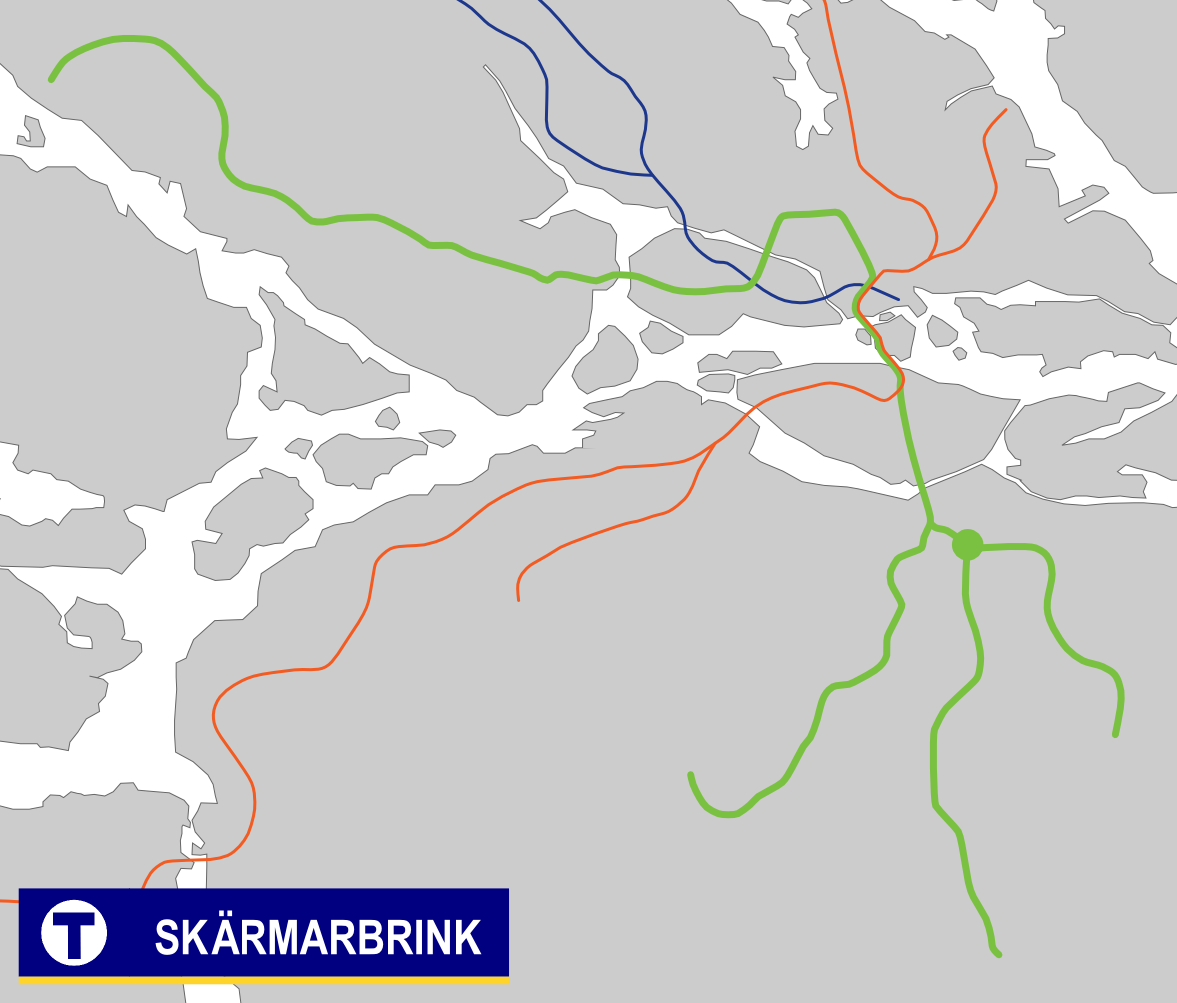

Skärmarbrink metro station is a station on lines 17 and 18 of the Stockholm Metro, located in Skärmarbrink, Johanneshov, Söderort. The station, opened on 1 October 1950, then called Hammarby until 16 April 1958, was on the first Metro line opened, from Slussen south to Hökarängen via Blåsut. On 16 April 1958, one-station extension to Hammarbyhöjden was opened. Skärmarbrink is connected to Hammarbydepån, a depot/garage for buses and subway trains which is located south of the station.
