= Hammarby depot =

Rail depot for Stockholm Metro, Sweden

Coordinates: 59°17′32″N 18°05′38″E

Hammarby Depot is a depot for maintenance of the Stockholm Metro and the infrastructure of Storstockholms Lokaltrafik, located in Söderort, Stockholm County. The depot is connected to Skärmarbrink metro station. It started operations in the 1940s, when Stockholms Spårvägar moved their workshop from Råsunda to Hammarby. Hammarby became a workshop/depot for the southern part of the 17, 18 and 19 lines when the 1st metro between Hökarängen and Slussen opened in 1950, but even Högdalsdepån is a workshop for this part of the Stockholm metro since 1957.

A new facility for infrastructure maintenance vehicles has been built in the eastern part of the complex, replacing the original parking hall for trains. It was taken into service in 2016.

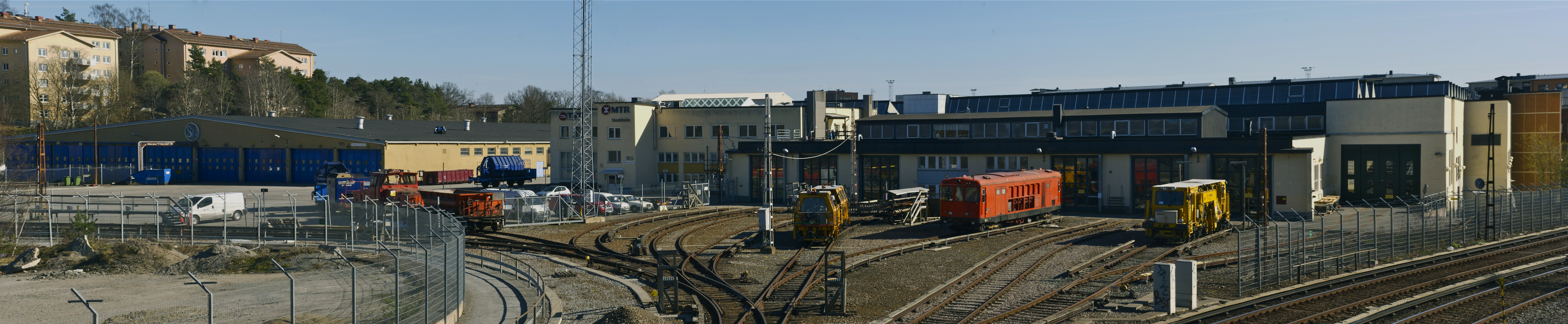
Panorama of the depot in April 2011
