= Enskede gård metro station =

Stockholm Metro station

Enskede gård
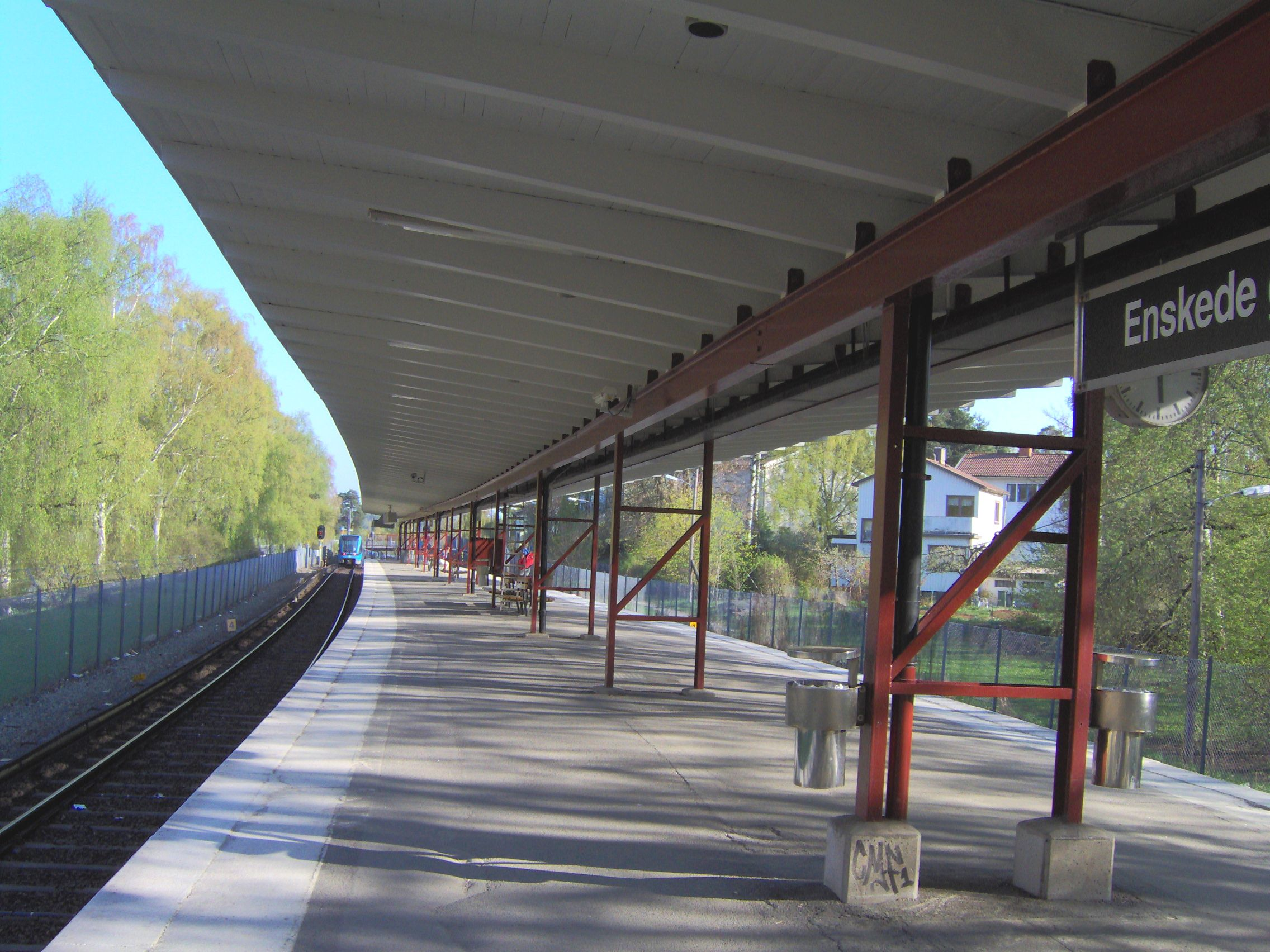

General information
- Coordinates: 59°17′20″N 18°04′14″E
- System: Stockholm Metro station
- Owner: Storstockholms Lokaltrafik
- Platforms: 1 island platform
- Tracks: 2

Construction
- Structure type: At grade
- Accessible: Yes

Other information
- Station code: ENG

History
- Opened: 1 October 1930; 95 years ago

Passengers
- 2019: 1,650 boarding per weekday

Services
Preceding station	Stockholm Metro	Following station
Globen towards Hässelby strand	Line 19	Sockenplan towards Hagsätra
Location
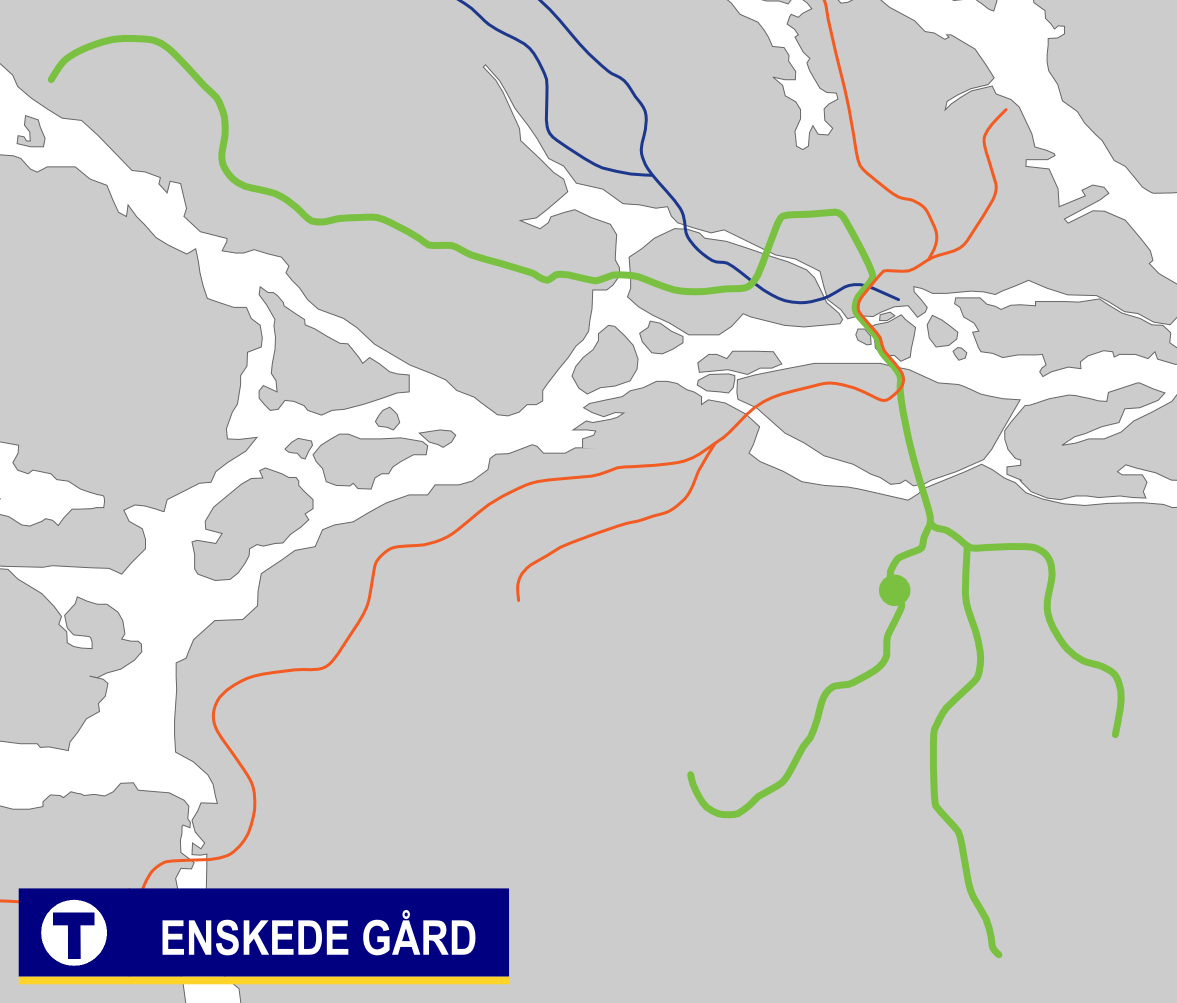

Enskede gård metro station is on the Green Line of the Stockholm Metro, located in Enskede gård, Söderort. The station was inaugurated on 1 October 1930 as part of the stretch between Gullmarsplan and Stureby. The distance to Slussen is 3.8 km.

According to plans presented in the spring of 2015, this station and the adjacent Globen station, which are both above ground, will be replaced by a single underground metro station called Slakthusområdet in the future. This change will be made when this branch of the Green Line is to be transferred to be a branch of the Blue Line when the latter line is extended to the south side of the city, expected to be completed sometime in 2030.
