= Slakthusområdet metro station =

Under-construction metro station in Stockholm

Slakthusområdet
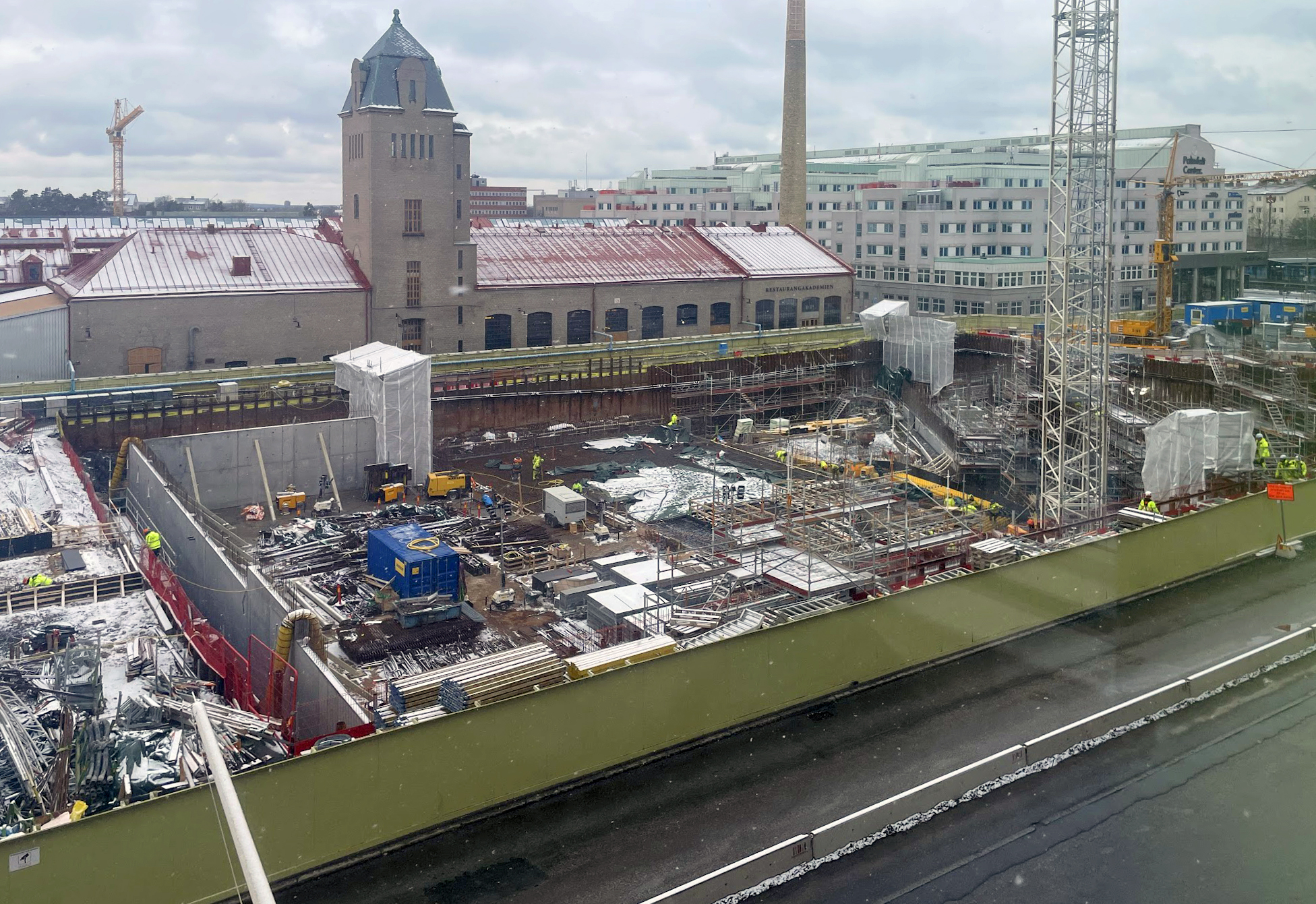
- Entrance under construction in 2025

General information
- Location: Slakthusområdet, Enskede-Årsta-Vantör, Stockholm
- Coordinates: 59°17′32.5″N 18°06′48.2″E
- System: Future Stockholm Metro station
- Owner: Storstockholms Lokaltrafik
- Platforms: 1 island platform
- Tracks: 2

Construction
- Structure type: Underground
- Depth: ca. 50m
- Accessible: Yes

History
- Opening: 2030; 4 years' time

Services
Preceding station: Gullmarsplan
Proceeding station: Sockenplan
Location

Slakthusområdet is a future station on the Blue Line of the Stockholm Metro. This station is part of the southern extension of the Blue Line, from Kungsträdgården to the current Green Line branch 19 to Hagsätra. Slakthusområdet metro station will be situated in the Slakthusområdet district, and will replace the existing stations of Enskede Gård and Globen. It will be located approximately 50 meters below ground level.

== Design and construction ==
The station will feature a single underground island platform, and it will have two entrances. The northern entrance, located at Rökerigatan, will be approximately 200 meters from the existing Globen station. The southern entrance, at Hallvägen & Charkmästargatan, will be situated under a planned new park.

Construction of the Slakthusområdet station commenced as part of the ongoing extension of the Blue Line towards Söderort. Tunnelling and rock blasting operations are underway beneath the area to prepare for the station and related infrastructure. The station is anticipated to be operational by 2030, with the redevelopment of the surrounding Slakthusområdet area expected to be complete in 2033.

== Surrounding area ==
The new Slakthusområdet station is designed to accommodate the influx of residents and businesses in the Slakthusområdet, which is being transformed into a new urban area with housing, commercial spaces, schools. With the opening of Slakthusområdet station, the existing stations at Enskede Gård and Globen will be closed, with their branch of the green line being connected instead to the Blue Line.
