= Sockenplan metro station =

Stockholm Metro station

Sockenplan
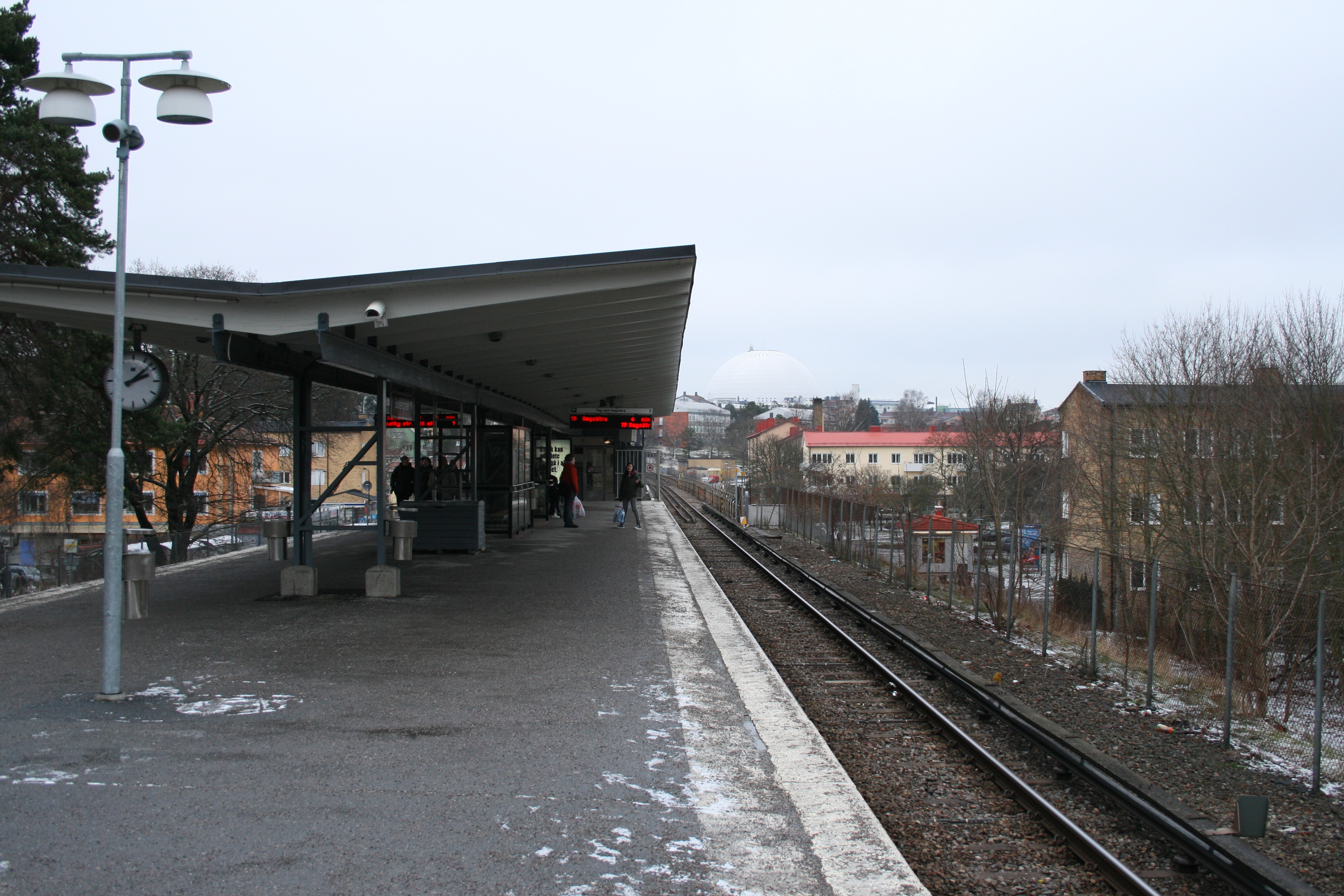

General information
- Coordinates: 59°16′58″N 18°04′13″E
- System: Stockholm Metro station
- Owner: Storstockholms Lokaltrafik
- Platforms: 1 island platform
- Tracks: 2

Construction
- Structure type: At grade
- Accessible: Yes

Other information
- Station code: SOP

History
- Opened: 1 October 1930; 95 years ago

Passengers
- 2019: 2,350 boarding per weekday

Services
Preceding station	Stockholm Metro	Following station
Enskede gård towards Hässelby strand	Line 19	Svedmyra towards Hagsätra
Location
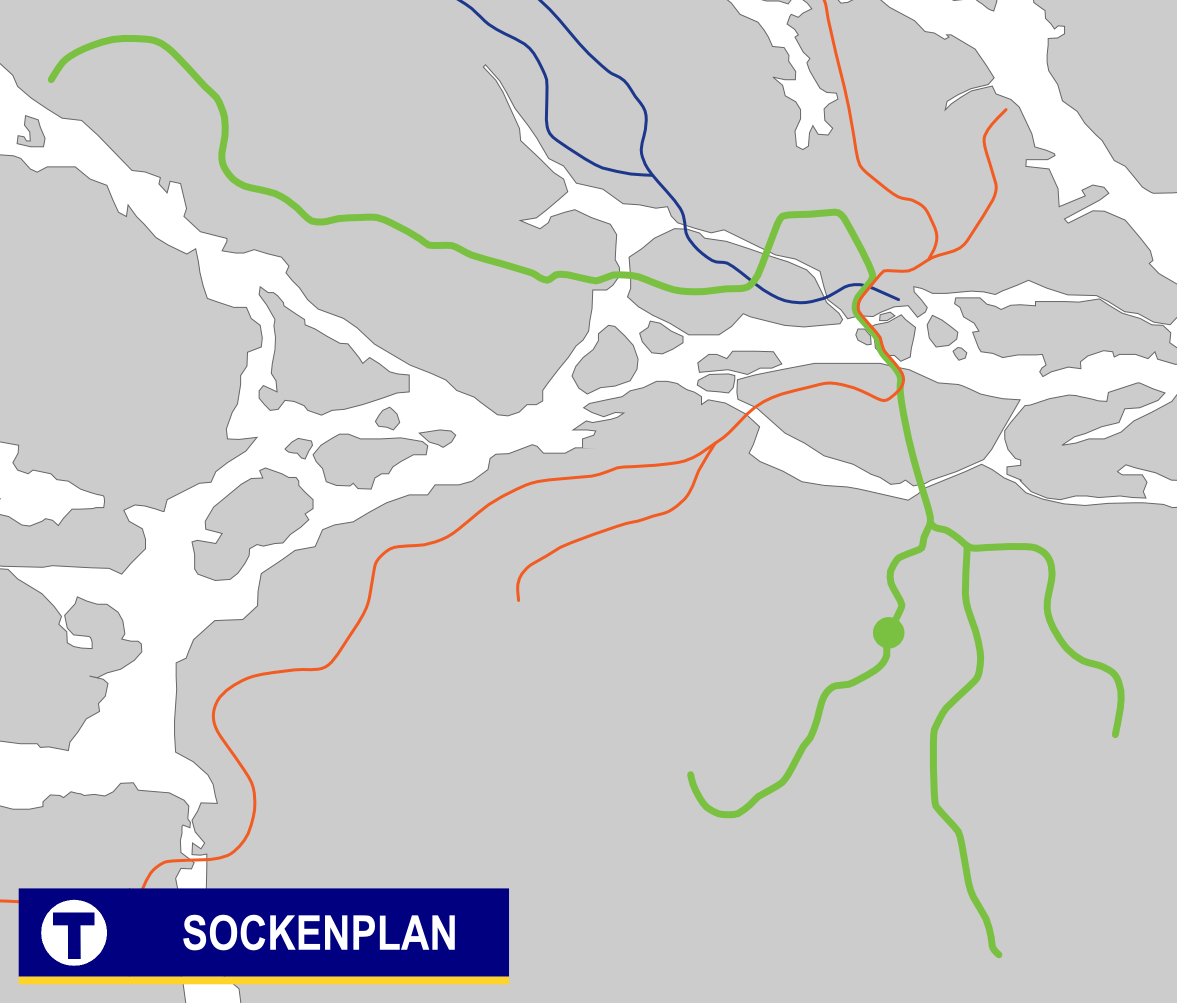

Sockenplan metro station is on the Green Line of the Stockholm Metro, located in Enskedefältet, Söderort. The station was inaugurated on 1 October 1930 as part of the stretch between Gullmarsplan and Stureby. The distance to Slussen is 4.6 km (2.9 mi).

A southerly extension of the Blue Line of the Stockholm Metro is currently under construction and expected to be opened for the passengers in 2030. As part of this development, the Blue line will take over this station.
