= Bandhagen metro station =

Stockholm Metro station

Bandhagen
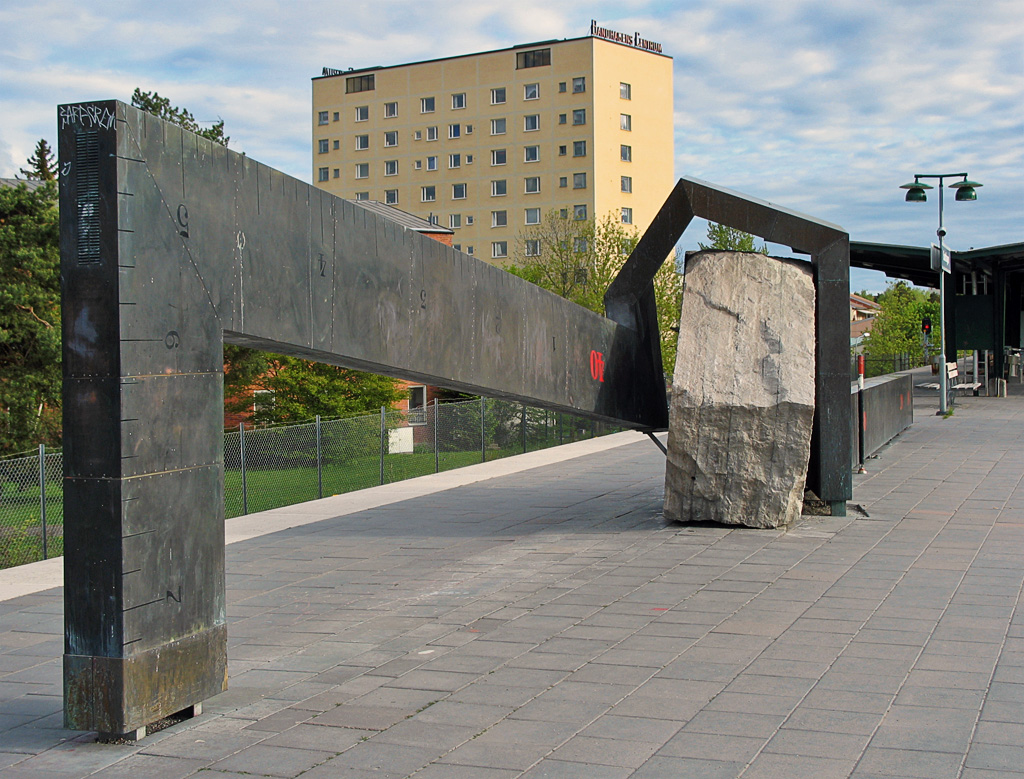

General information
- Coordinates: 59°16′14″N 18°02′58″E
- System: Stockholm Metro station
- Owner: Storstockholms Lokaltrafik
- Platforms: 1 island platform
- Tracks: 2

Construction
- Structure type: Elevated
- Accessible: Yes

Other information
- Station code: BAH

History
- Opened: 22 November 1954; 71 years ago

Passengers
- 2019: 3,800 boarding per weekday

Services
Preceding station	Stockholm Metro	Following station
Stureby towards Hässelby strand	Line 19	Högdalen towards Hagsätra
Location
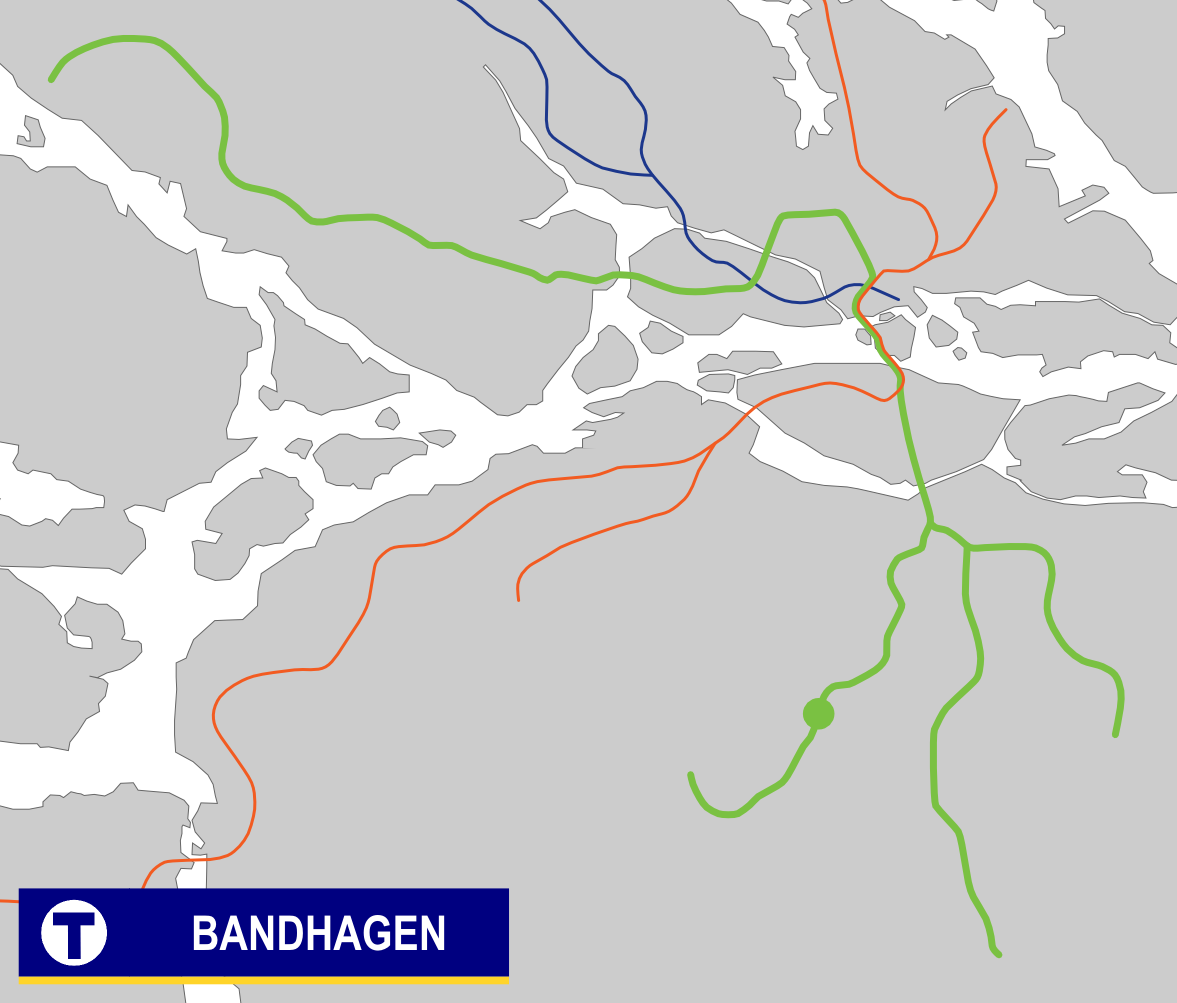

Bandhagen metro station is on the Green Line of the Stockholm Metro, located in Bandhagen, Söderort. The station was inaugurated on 22 November 1954 as part of the extension from Stureby to Högdalen. The distance to Slussen is 6.5 km.

A southerly extension of the Blue Line of the Stockholm Metro is currently under construction and expected to be opened for the passengers in 2030. As part of this development, the Blue Line will take over this station.
