= Globen metro station =

Stockholm Metro station

Globen
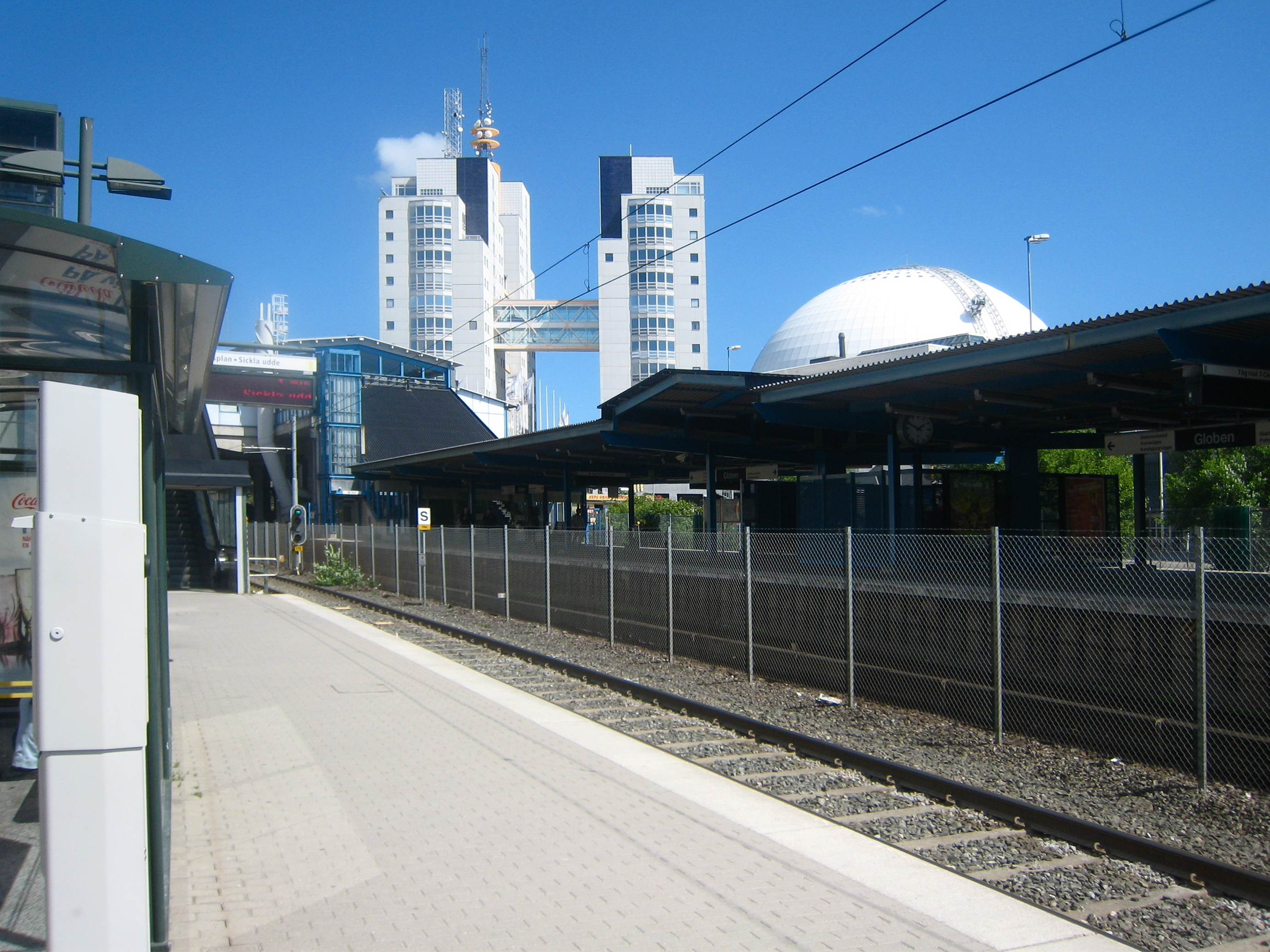

General information
- Coordinates: 59°17′39″N 18°04′38″E
- System: Stockholm Metro station
- Owner: Storstockholms Lokaltrafik
- Platforms: 1 island platform
- Tracks: 2

Construction
- Structure type: At grade
- Accessible: Yes

Other information
- Station code: GLB

History
- Opened: 1 October 1930; 95 years ago
- Former names: Slakthuset (1930–1958); Isstadion (1958–1989)

Passengers
- 2019: 6,550 boarding per weekday (metro)
- 2019: 3,800 boarding per weekday (Tvärbanan)

Services
Preceding station	Stockholm Metro	Following station
Gullmarsplan towards Hässelby strand	Line 19	Enskede gård towards Hagsätra

Other services
Preceding station	SL Local & Light Rail	Following station
Linde towards Solna station	Tvärbanan Line 30	Gullmarsplan towards Sickla
Location
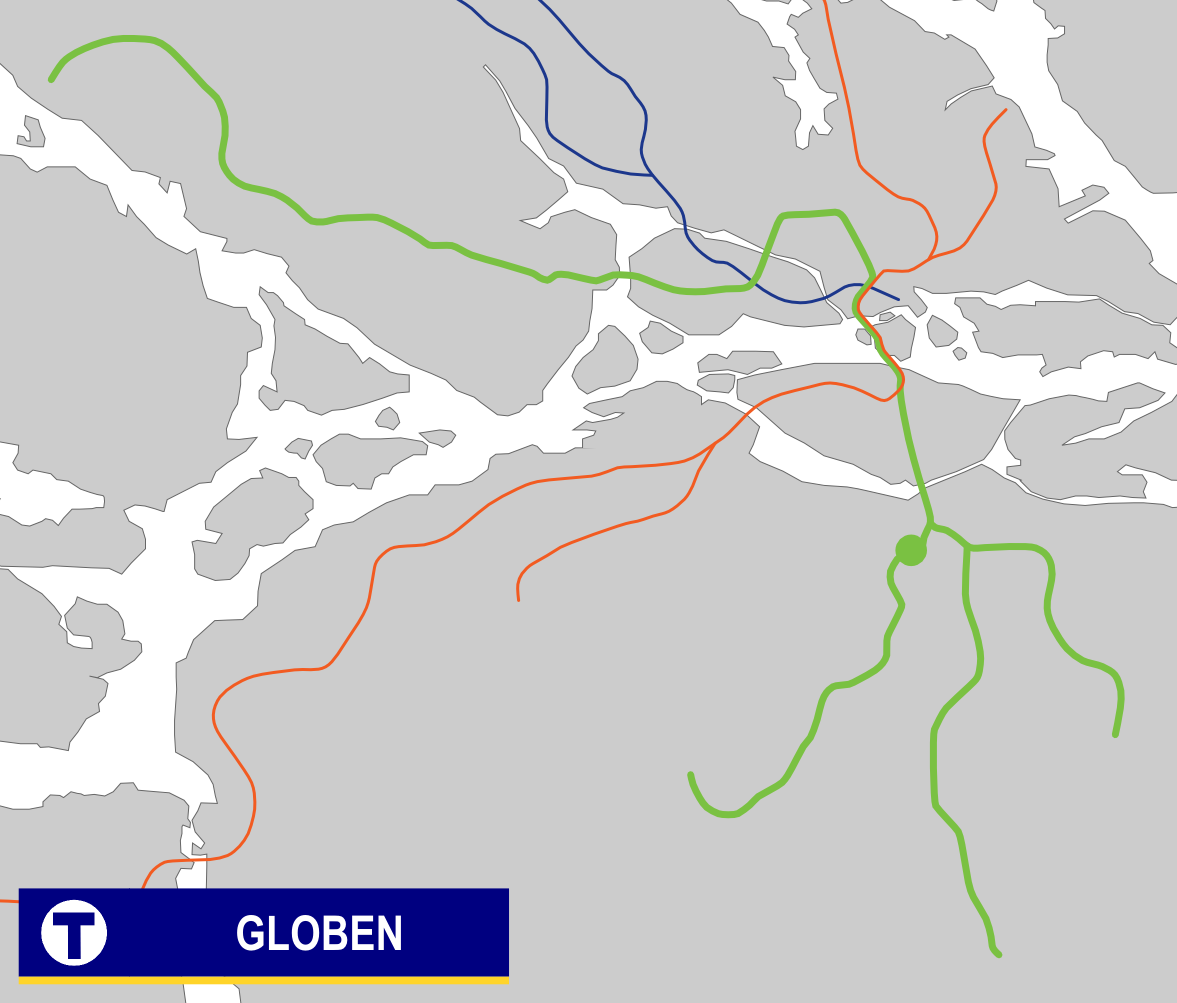

Globen metro station is on the Green Line of the Stockholm Metro and the Tvärbanan light rail line, located by Globen in Johanneshov, Söderort. The station was opened on 1 October 1930 as Slakthuset station (named after an old abattoir around the area that has since been converted into a nightclub) as a part of the stretch between Gullmarsplan and Stureby. In 1958 the station was renamed as Isstadion station (after the nearby Johanneshovs Isstadion, now known as Hovet). The station acquired its current name on 20 August 1989 and is the only one in the system to have had more than two names. The distance to Slussen is 3 km (1.9 mi). There is a track connection to Tvärbanan just north of Globen metro station, and Tvärbanan has track connection to the railway, which is used for deliveries of new metro trains.

According to plans presented in the spring of 2015, this station and the adjacent Enskede gård station, which are both above ground, will be replaced by a single underground metro station called Slakthusområdet in the future. This change will be made when this branch of the Green Line is to be transferred to be a branch of the Blue Line when the latter line is extended to the south side of the city, expected to be completed sometime in 2030.
