= Högdalen metro station =

Stockholm Metro station

Högdalen
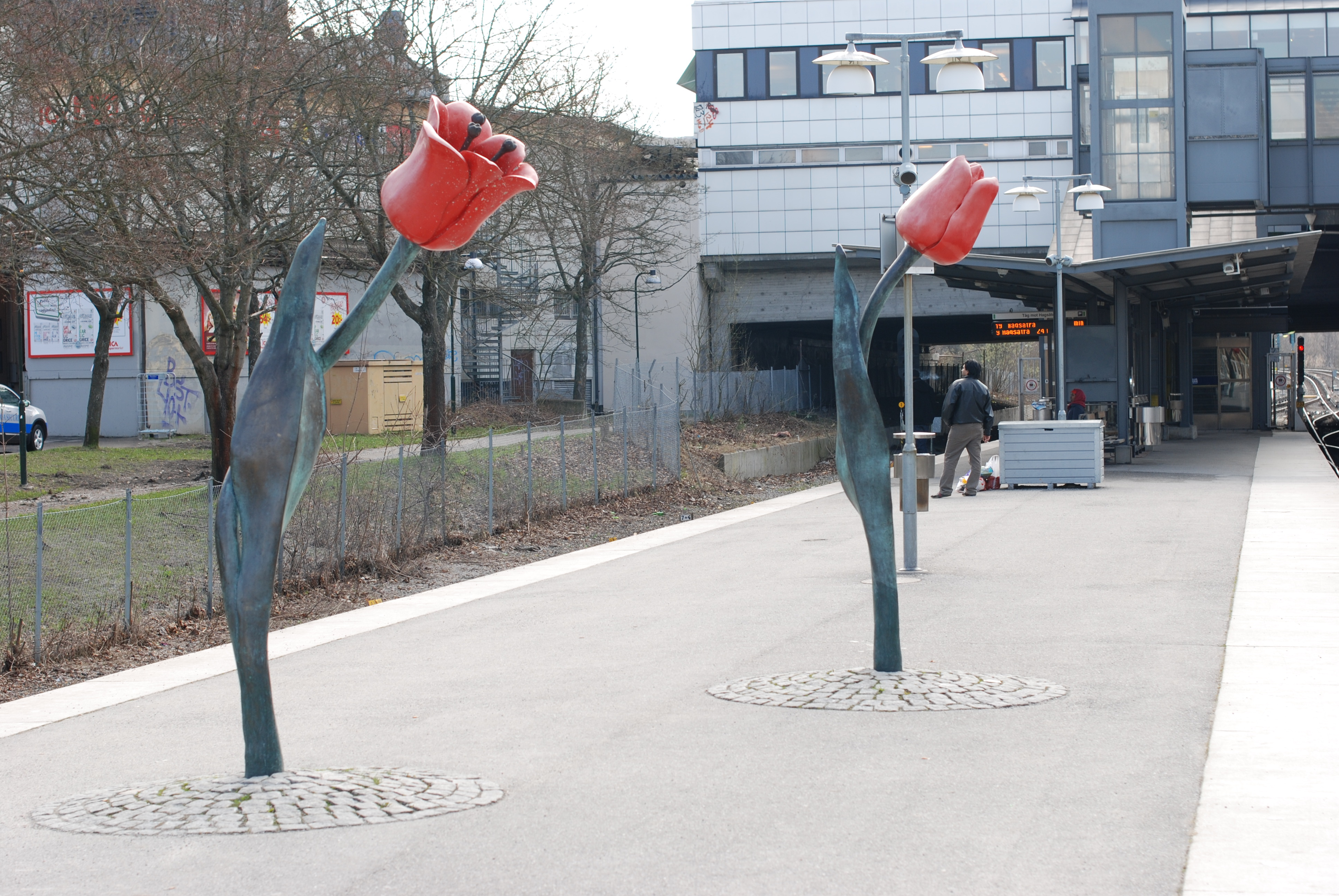

General information
- Coordinates: 59°15′50″N 18°02′35″E
- System: Stockholm Metro station
- Owner: Storstockholms Lokaltrafik
- Platforms: 2 island platforms
- Tracks: 3

Construction
- Structure type: At grade
- Accessible: Yes

Other information
- Station code: HÖD

History
- Opened: 22 November 1954; 71 years ago

Passengers
- 2019: 8,200 boarding per weekday

Services
Preceding station	Stockholm Metro	Following station
Bandhagen towards Hässelby strand	Line 19	Rågsved towards Hagsätra
Location
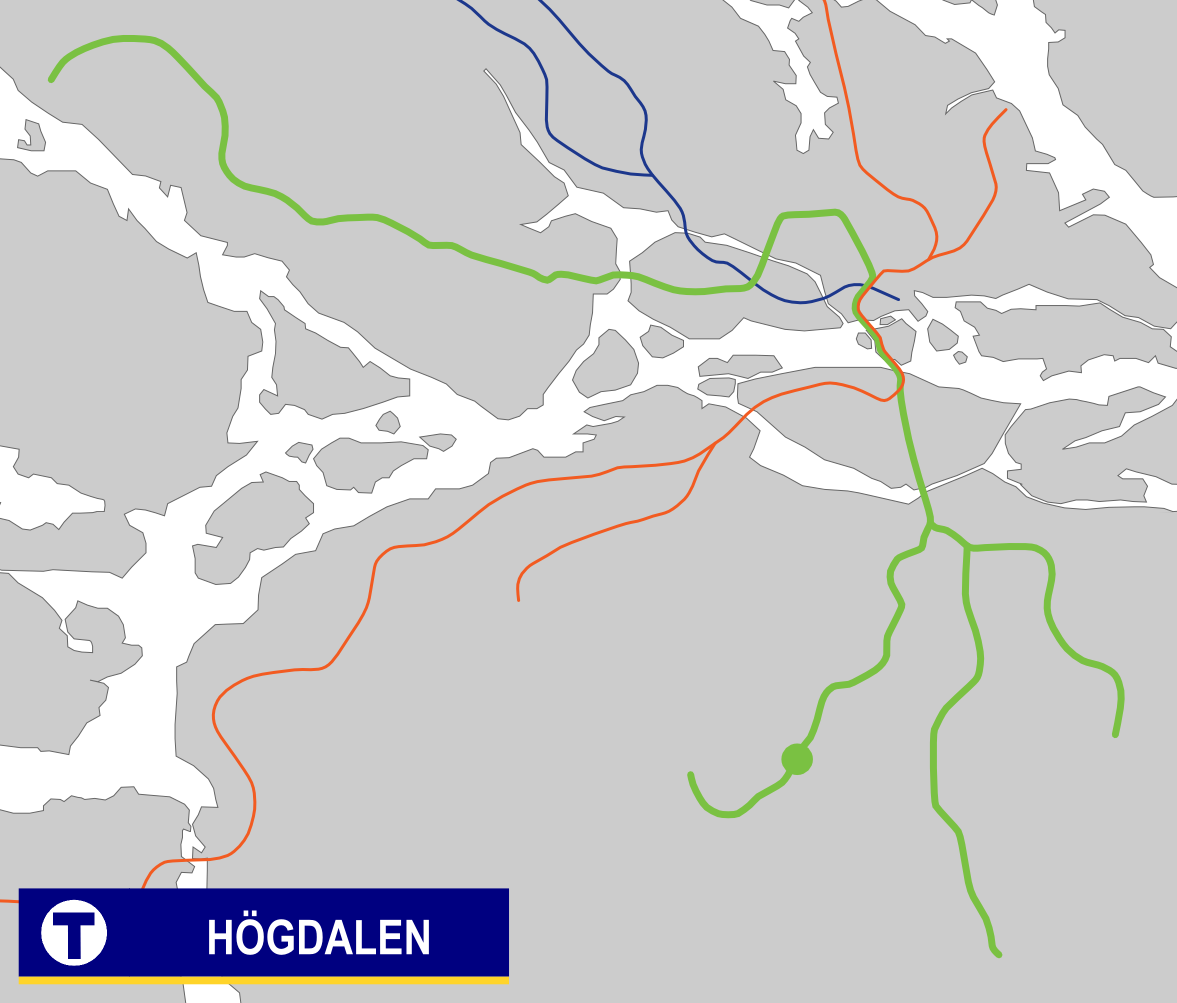

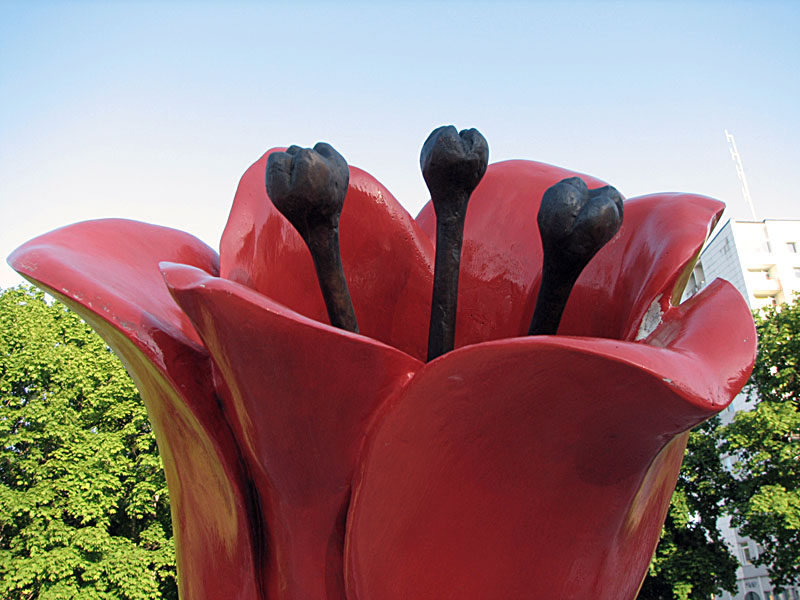

Högdalen metro station is a Green Line Stockholm Metro station, located in Högdalen, Söderort, Stockholm Municipality. The station was inaugurated on 22 November 1954 as the south terminus of the extension from Stureby. On 13 November 1959, the line was extended south to Rågsved. Högdalen metro station, which sits 7.3 km (4.5 mi) from Slussen, is connected to Högdalsdepån (Högdalen Depot), a depot for subway trains for Stockholm Metro that opened in 1957.

A southerly extension of the Blue Line of the Stockholm Metro is currently under construction and expected to open for passengers in 2030. As part of this development, the Blue Line will take over this station.
