= Rågsved metro station =

Stockholm Metro station

Rågsved
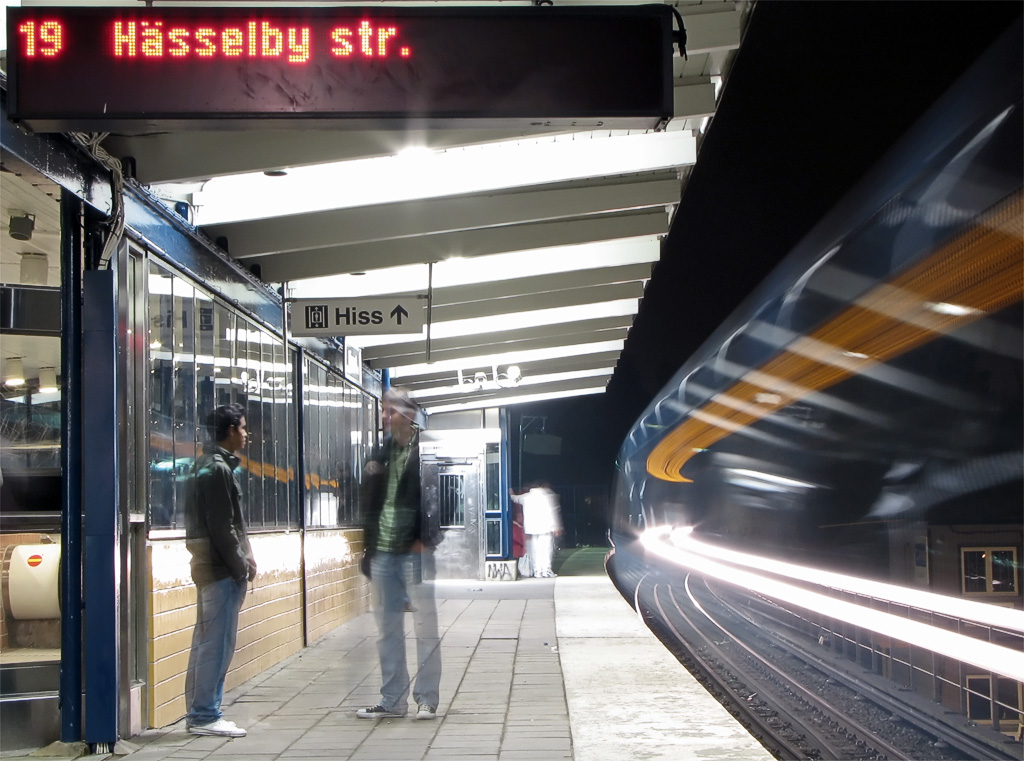

General information
- Coordinates: 59°15′24″N 18°01′42″E
- System: Stockholm Metro station
- Owner: Storstockholms Lokaltrafik
- Platforms: 1 island platform
- Tracks: 2

Construction
- Structure type: Elevated
- Accessible: Yes

Other information
- Station code: RÅG

History
- Opened: 13 November 1959; 66 years ago

Passengers
- 2019: 5,500 boarding per weekday

Services
Preceding station	Stockholm Metro	Following station
Högdalen towards Hässelby strand	Line 19	Hagsätra Terminus
Location
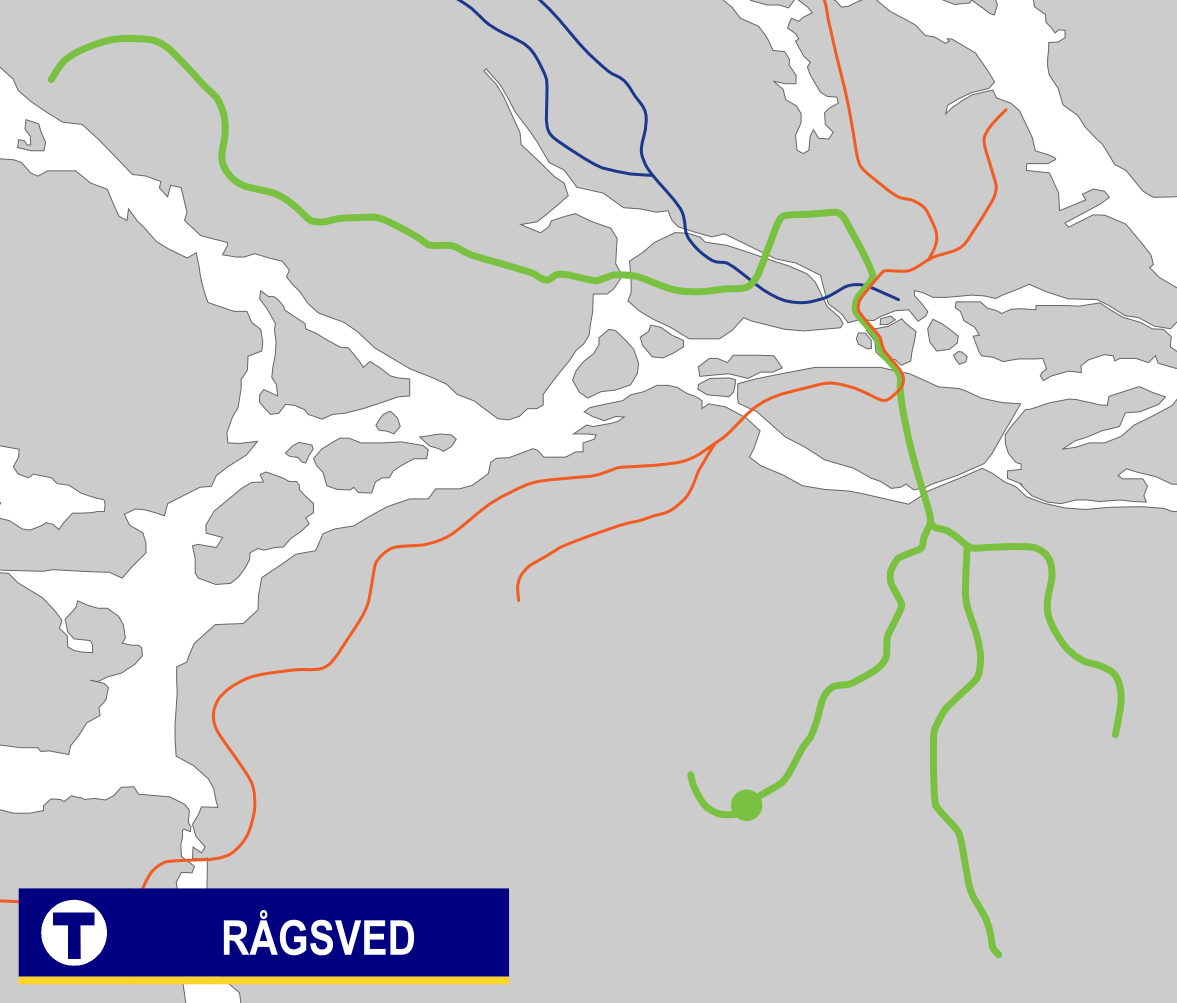

Rågsved metro station is on the Green Line of the Stockholm Metro, located in Rågsved, Söderort. The station was inaugurated on 13 November 1959 as the southern terminus of a one-station extension from Högdalen. On 1 December 1960 the line was extended further to Hagsätra. The distance to Slussen is 8.5 km (5.3 mi).

A southerly extension of the Blue Line of the Stockholm Metro is currently under construction and expected to be opened for the passengers in 2030. As part of this development, the Blue line will take over this station.
