= List of Stockholm Metro stations =

This is a list of Stockholm Metro stations, on the rapid transit system of Stockholm, Sweden.

== Lines ==
Blue	Red	Green
Kungsträdgården — Hjulsta Kungsträdgården — Akalla	Norsborg — Ropsten Fruängen — Mörby centrum	Hässelby strand — Skarpnäck Hässelby strand — Farsta strand Hässelby strand — Hagsätra

== Stations ==
Stations are listed in order from north to south by line. Stations in bold are interchange stations: while lines may share many stations, only stations where lines cross, or stations where lines diverge (such as when lines 17 and 18 split) are considered transfer stations.

Lines	Station	Opened	Grade
Blue Line (Stockholm Metro)	Hjulsta	1975	underground
Blue Line (Stockholm Metro)	Tensta	1975	underground
Blue Line (Stockholm Metro)	Rinkeby	1975	underground
Blue Line (Stockholm Metro)	Rissne	1985	underground
Blue Line (Stockholm Metro)	Duvbo	1985	underground
Blue Line (Stockholm Metro)	Sundbybergs centrum	1985	underground
Blue Line (Stockholm Metro)	Solna strand	1985	underground
Blue Line (Stockholm Metro)	Huvudsta	1985	underground
Blue Line (Stockholm Metro)	Akalla	1977	underground
Blue Line (Stockholm Metro)	Husby	1977	underground
Blue Line (Stockholm Metro)	Kista	1977	elevated
Blue Line (Stockholm Metro)	Kymlinge	——	partial underground
Blue Line (Stockholm Metro)	Hallonbergen	1975	underground
Blue Line (Stockholm Metro)	Näckrosen	1975	underground
Blue Line (Stockholm Metro)	Solna centrum	1975	underground
Blue Line (Stockholm Metro)	**Västra skogen**	1975	underground
Blue Line (Stockholm Metro)	Stadshagen	1975	underground
Blue Line (Stockholm Metro) Green Line (Stockholm Metro)	**Fridhemsplan**	1952	underground
Blue Line (Stockholm Metro)	Rådhuset	1975	underground
Blue Line (Stockholm Metro) Red Line (Stockholm Metro) Green Line (Stockholm Metro)	**T-Centralen**	1957	underground
Blue Line (Stockholm Metro)	Kungsträdgården	1977	underground
Red Line (Stockholm Metro)	Ropsten	1967	elevated
Red Line (Stockholm Metro)	Gärdet	1967	underground
Red Line (Stockholm Metro)	Karlaplan	1967	underground
Red Line (Stockholm Metro)	**Östermalmstorg**	1965	underground
Red Line (Stockholm Metro) Green Line (Stockholm Metro)	Gamla stan	1957	elevated
Red Line (Stockholm Metro) Green Line (Stockholm Metro)	**Slussen**	1950	underground
Red Line (Stockholm Metro)	Mariatorget	1964	underground
Red Line (Stockholm Metro)	Zinkensdamm	1964	underground
Red Line (Stockholm Metro)	Hornstull	1964	underground
Red Line (Stockholm Metro)	**Liljeholmen**	1964	underground
Red Line (Stockholm Metro)	Aspudden	1964	underground
Red Line (Stockholm Metro)	Örnsberg	1964	below grade
Red Line (Stockholm Metro)	Axelsberg	1965	at grade
Red Line (Stockholm Metro)	Mälarhöjden	1967	underground
Red Line (Stockholm Metro)	Bredäng	1965	open-cut
Red Line (Stockholm Metro)	Sätra	1965	at grade
Red Line (Stockholm Metro)	Skärholmen	1967	underground
Red Line (Stockholm Metro)	Vårberg	1967	below grade
Red Line (Stockholm Metro)	Vårby gård	1972	elevated
Red Line (Stockholm Metro)	Masmo	1972	underground
Red Line (Stockholm Metro)	Fittja	1972	elevated
Red Line (Stockholm Metro)	Alby	1975	underground
Red Line (Stockholm Metro)	Hallunda	1975	at grade
Red Line (Stockholm Metro)	Norsborg	1975	at grade
Red Line (Stockholm Metro)	Mörby centrum	1978	underground
Red Line (Stockholm Metro)	Danderyds sjukhus	1978	underground
Red Line (Stockholm Metro)	Bergshamra	1978	underground
Red Line (Stockholm Metro)	Universitetet	1975	underground
Red Line (Stockholm Metro)	Tekniska högskolan	1973	underground
Red Line (Stockholm Metro)	Stadion	1973	underground
Red Line (Stockholm Metro)	Midsommarkransen	1964	underground
Red Line (Stockholm Metro)	Telefonplan	1964	below grade
Red Line (Stockholm Metro)	Hägerstensåsen	1964	elevated
Red Line (Stockholm Metro)	Västertorp	1964	at grade
Red Line (Stockholm Metro)	Fruängen	1964	elevated
Green Line (Stockholm Metro)	Åkeshov	1952	at grade
Green Line (Stockholm Metro)	Brommaplan	1952	elevated
Green Line (Stockholm Metro)	Abrahamsberg	1952	elevated
Green Line (Stockholm Metro)	Stora mossen	1952	elevated
Green Line (Stockholm Metro)	Alvik	1952	elevated
Green Line (Stockholm Metro)	Kristineberg	1952	at grade
Green Line (Stockholm Metro)	Thorildsplan	1952	below grade
Green Line (Stockholm Metro)	Sankt Eriksplan	1952	underground
Green Line (Stockholm Metro)	Odenplan	1952	underground
Green Line (Stockholm Metro)	Rådmansgatan	1952	underground
Green Line (Stockholm Metro)	Hötorget	1952	underground
Green Line (Stockholm Metro)	Medborgarplatsen	1950	underground
Green Line (Stockholm Metro)	Skanstull	1950	underground
Green Line (Stockholm Metro)	**Gullmarsplan**	1950	at grade
Green Line (Stockholm Metro)	**Skärmarbrink**	1950	at grade
Green Line (Stockholm Metro)	Hammarbyhöjden	1958	at grade
Green Line (Stockholm Metro)	Björkhagen	1958	elevated
Green Line (Stockholm Metro)	Kärrtorp	1958	elevated
Green Line (Stockholm Metro)	Bagarmossen	1994	underground
Green Line (Stockholm Metro)	Skarpnäck	1994	underground
Green Line (Stockholm Metro)	Blåsut	1950	at grade
Green Line (Stockholm Metro)	Sandsborg	1950	at grade
Green Line (Stockholm Metro)	Skogskyrkogården	1950	elevated
Green Line (Stockholm Metro)	Tallkrogen	1950	elevated
Green Line (Stockholm Metro)	Gubbängen	1950	at grade
Green Line (Stockholm Metro)	Hökarängen	1950	at grade
Green Line (Stockholm Metro)	Farsta	1960	elevated
Green Line (Stockholm Metro)	Farsta strand	1971	covered at-grade
Green Line (Stockholm Metro)	Hässelby strand	1958	below grade
Green Line (Stockholm Metro)	Hässelby gård	1958	elevated
Green Line (Stockholm Metro)	Johannelund	1956	at grade
Green Line (Stockholm Metro)	Vällingby	1952	at grade
Green Line (Stockholm Metro)	Råcksta	1952	elevated
Green Line (Stockholm Metro)	Blackeberg	1952	open-cut
Green Line (Stockholm Metro)	Islandstorget	1952	at grade
Green Line (Stockholm Metro)	Ängbyplan	1952	elevated
Green Line (Stockholm Metro)	Globen	1951	at grade
Green Line (Stockholm Metro)	Enskede gård	1951	at grade
Green Line (Stockholm Metro)	Sockenplan	1951	elevated
Green Line (Stockholm Metro)	Svedmyra	1951	elevated
Green Line (Stockholm Metro)	Stureby	1951	at grade
Green Line (Stockholm Metro)	Bandhagen	1954	elevated
Green Line (Stockholm Metro)	Högdalen	1954	at grade
Green Line (Stockholm Metro)	Rågsved	1959	elevated
Green Line (Stockholm Metro)	Hagsätra	1960	elevated
