= Stureby metro station =

Stockholm Metro station

Stureby
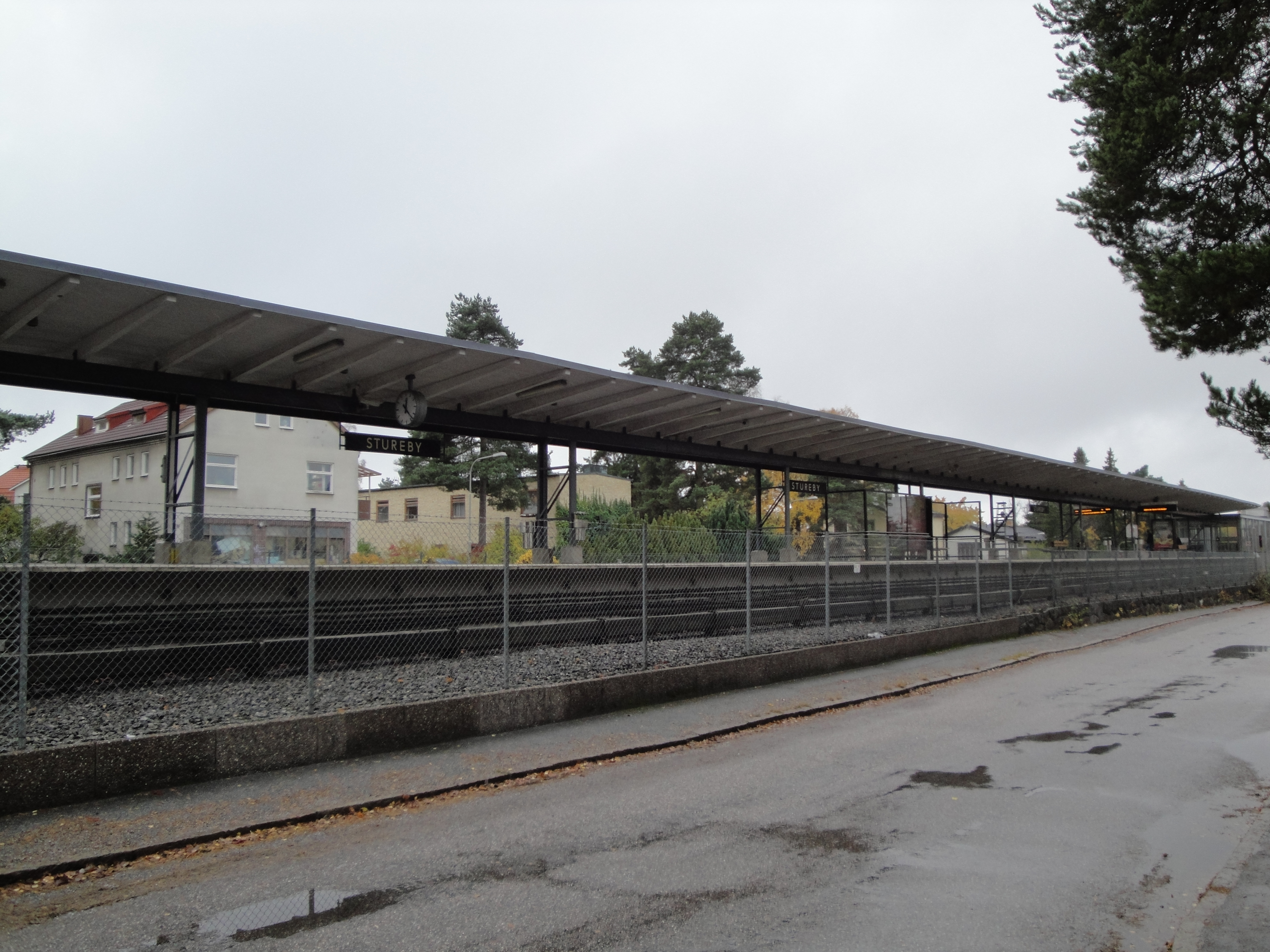

General information
- Coordinates: 59°16′29″N 18°03′25″E
- System: Stockholm Metro station
- Owner: Storstockholms Lokaltrafik
- Platforms: 1 island platform
- Tracks: 2

Construction
- Structure type: Elevated
- Accessible: Yes

Other information
- Station code: STB

History
- Opened: 1 October 1930; 95 years ago

Passengers
- 2019: 2,450 boarding per weekday

Services
| Preceding station | Stockholm Metro | Following station |
|---|---|---|
| Svedmyra towards Hässelby strand | Line 19 | Bandhagen towards Hagsätra |
Location
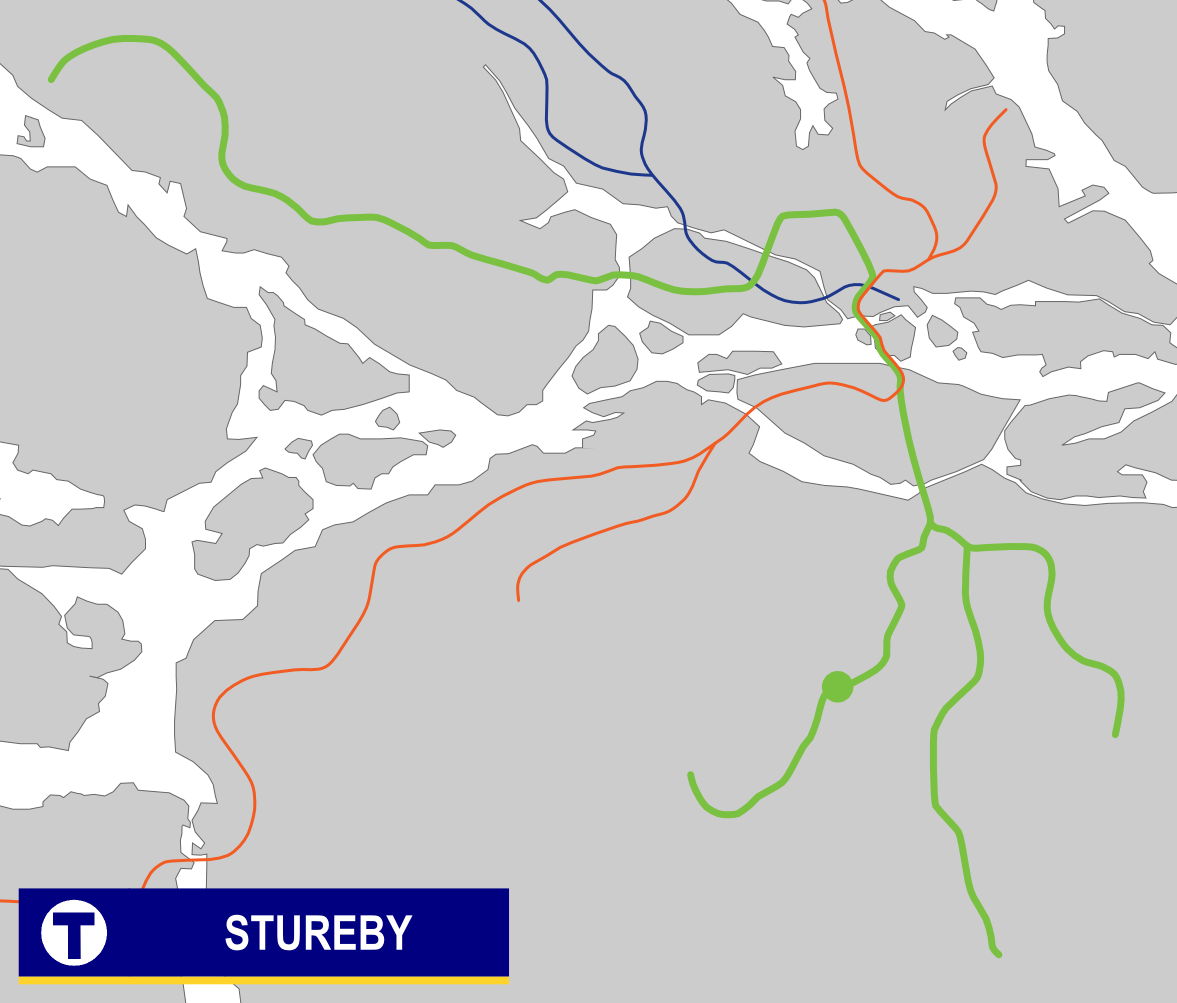

Stureby metro station is on the Green Line of the Stockholm Metro, located in Stureby, Söderort. The provisional station was inaugurated on 1 October 1930 as the southern terminus of the stretch from Gullmarsplan, and the current permanent station was inaugurated on 1 October 1953. On 22 November 1954, the extension south to Högdalen was open. The distance to Slussen is 5.8 km (3.6 mi).

A southerly extension of the Blue Line of the Stockholm Metro is currently under construction and expected to be opened for the passengers in 2030. As part of this development, the Blue line will take over this station.
