= Green Line (Stockholm Metro) =

Metro line in Stockholm, Sweden

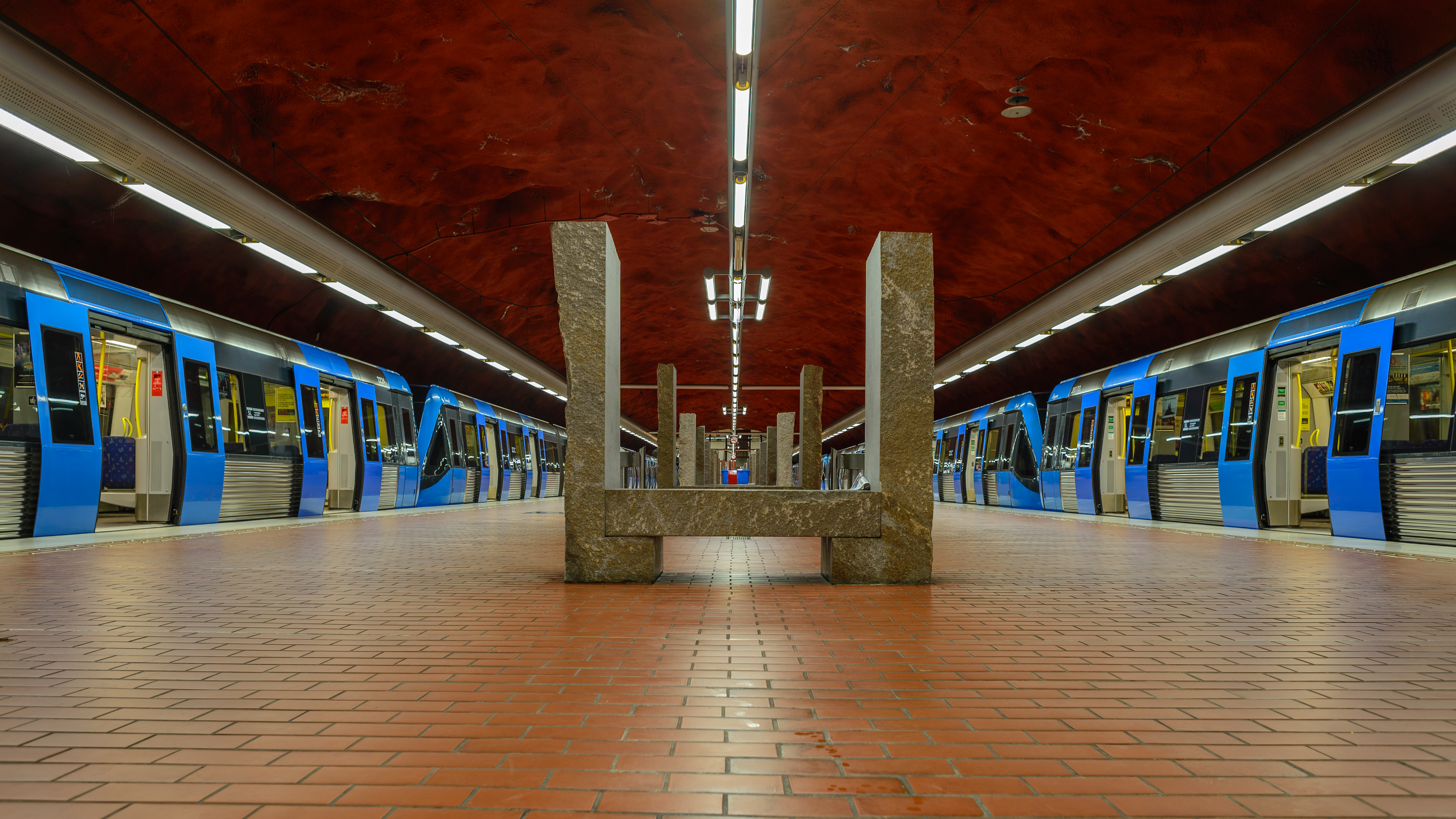
- Skarpnäck station

Overview
- Native name: Gröna linjen
- Locale: Stockholm, Sweden
- Stations: 49

Service
- Type: Rapid transit
- System: Storstockholms Lokaltrafik (SL)
- Services: Hässelby strand–Skarpnäck; Hässelby strand–Farsta strand Hässelby strand–Hagsätra
- Operator: Connecting Stockholm (ticketing by SL)
- Depot(s): Vällingby, Hammarby, Högdalen
- Daily ridership: 553,350 (2019)

History
- Opened: 1 October 1950; 76 years ago
- Last extension: 1994

Technical
- Line length: 41.2 km (25.6 mi)
- Num of tracks: 2
- Character: Underground subway and at–grade-separated
- Track gauge: 1,435 mm (4 ft 8 1/2 in) standard gauge
- Electrification: 650 V DC third rail

The Green Line (Swedish: Gröna linjen; officially Metro 1, but called Tub 1 ("Tube 1", or abbreviation for "Tunnelbana 1") internally) is the oldest of the three Stockholm Metro lines. The 41.256-kilometre (25.635 mi) long line comprises a single double-tracked line north of the city centre, splitting into three branches south of the city centre. The first section of the line opened as a metro in 1950, making it the first and oldest metro line in the Nordic countries, although some parts of the line date back to the 1930s and were originally used by the Stockholm tramway.

== History ==
=== Before the Metro ===
The first section of what is now the Green Line opened as a metro in 1950, but several sections of the line use infrastructure that was originally built for, or used by, the Stockholm tramway. These include:

- Between Globen and Stureby, the line uses tracks that were created for use by route 19 of the tramway in 1930. These tracks required rebuilding, with the removal of level crossings, before metro trains could use them.
- Between Slussen and Skanstull, the line uses the Södertunneln, a tunnel originally built for use by routes 8 and 19 of the tramway in 1933. The tunnel stations required rebuilding before metro trains could use them.
- Between Kristineberg and Alvik, the line uses the Tranebergsbron, a road bridge built with segregated tram tracks in 1934. The tram tracks were repurposed for use by metro trains.
- Between Alvik and Islandstorget, the line uses tracks that were built to metro standards, without level crossings, but used by trams from 1944.
- Between Skanstull and Gullmarsplan, the line uses the Skanstullsbron, a road bridge built with rail tracks in 1946. The tracks were designed for use by the metro but initially used by trams.

=== Opening of the Metro ===
The Green Line and its branches opened in stages:

- On Sunday October 1, 1950, the line opened between Slussen and Hökarängen, including the rebuilt tram tracks through the Södertunneln and over the Skanstullsbron.
- On Sunday September 9, 1951, the branch from Gullmarsplan to Stureby opened, largely using the rebuilt route of tram route 19.
- On Sunday October 26, 1952, a detached section of line from Hötorget to Vällingby was opened, including the former tram tracks over the Tranebergsbron and on to Islandstorget.
- On Monday November 22, 1954, the line was extended from Stureby to Högdalen.
- On Thursday November 1, 1956, the line was extended from Vällingby to Hässelby gård.
- On Sunday November 24, 1957, Hotorget was linked to Slussen across central Stockholm, connecting the two previously disconnected sections of line
- On Thursday April 17, 1958, the branch from Skärmarbrink to Hammarbyhöjden was opened
- On Tuesday November 18, 1958, the line was extended from Hammarbyhöjden to Bagarmossen, from Hökarängen to Farsta, and from Hässelby gård to Hässelby strand
- On Friday November 13, 1959, the line was extended from Högdalen to Rågsved
- On Thursday December 1, 1960, the line was extended from Rågsved to Hagsätra
- On Sunday August 29, 1971, the line was extended from Farsta to Farsta strand
- On Monday August 15, 1994, the line was extended from Bagarmossen to Skarpnäck

== Route ==
The Green Line comprises a single line north of the city centre, splitting into three branches south of the city centre, with a total line length of 41.256 kilometres (25.635 mi). It is served by three Metro routes, each serving one of the three southern branches. Line 17 links Hässelby strand to Skarpnäck, line 18 links Hässelby strand to Farsta strand and Line 19 links Hässelby strand to Hagsätra. For most of the day, trains run every 10 minutes on each service, combining to provide 18 trains per hour over the common section. Additional trains run during peak periods, with services reducing to half-hourly overnight.

The Green Line has interchanges with the Metro's Red Line at T-Centralen, Gamla stan and Slussen, and with the Blue Line at Fridhemsplan and T-Centralen. It also has interchanges with the Pendeltåg commuter rail at Odenplan, T-Centralen and Farsta strand, with longer distance rail lines at T-Centralen, with the Tvärbanan light rail at Alvik, Gullmarsplan and Globen, with the Nockebybanan light rail at Alvik, and with the Spårväg City tram at T-Centralen. The interchange with the Saltsjöbanan commuter rail at Slussen is not in use due to reconstruction of the latter line.

The Green Line has a total of 49 stations, of which 12 are underground and 37 are above ground. Unlike the later Metro lines, the underground section of the Green Line in the city centre was built in relatively shallow tunnels, and therefore the line has few of the Stockholm Metro's trademark deep-level stations hewn from the bare rock, with most of its underground stations having concrete linings.

== Future plans ==
A southerly extension of the Blue Line of the Stockholm Metro is currently under construction and expected to be opened for the passengers in 2030. As part of this development, the Blue Line will take over most of the branch to Hagsätra from the Green Line. The section of the branch to be taken over runs from a point north of Sockenplan to the terminus at Hagsätra, whilst the section between the branch junction at Gullmarsplan and Sockenplan will be closed. This means that the existing stations at Globen and Enskede gård will also close, although a new station on the Blue Line at Slakthusområdet will replace these.

A new 4.1-kilometre (2.5 mi) long line is also under construction that will run from Odenplan on the Green Line and serve new stations at Hagastaden, Södra Hagalund and Arenastaden. The new line was formerly designated as the Yellow Line, but since May 2023 SL intends to operate it as a branch of the Green Line.

There are plans to divert the Roslagsbanan commuter rail in tunnel via Odenplan to a terminus at T-Centralen, thus providing interchanges with the Green Line at both those stations.

== Bibliography ==
- Alfredsson, Björn; Berndt, Roland; Harlén, Hans (2007). Stockholm under: 100 stationer (in Swedish) (2nd ed.). Stockholm: Bromberg. ISBN 978-91-7337-051-6. SELIBR 10614768.
