= Gullmarsplan metro station =

Stockholm Metro station

Gullmarsplan
- Metro platforms

General information
- Coordinates: 59°17′54″N 18°4′51″E
- Elevation: 38.8 m (127 ft) above sea level
- System: Stockholm Metro station
- Owner: Storstockholms Lokaltrafik
- Platforms: 2
- Tracks: 5 (Green Line, only 4 in use currently); 2 (Tvärbanan)

Construction
- Structure type: At grade
- Accessible: Yes

Other information
- Station code: GUP

History
- Opened: 1 October 1950; 76 years ago

Passengers
- 2019: 38,750 boarding per weekday (metro)
- 2019: 12,900 boarding per weekday (Tvärbanan)

Services
Preceding station	Stockholm Metro	Following station
Skanstull towards Åkeshov	Line 17	Skärmarbrink towards Skarpnäck
Skanstull towards Alvik	Line 18	Skärmarbrink towards Farsta strand
Skanstull towards Hässelby strand	Line 19	Globen towards Hagsätra

Other services
Preceding station	SL Local & Light Rail	Following station
Globen towards Solna station	Tvärbanan Line 30	Mårtensdal towards Sickla
Location
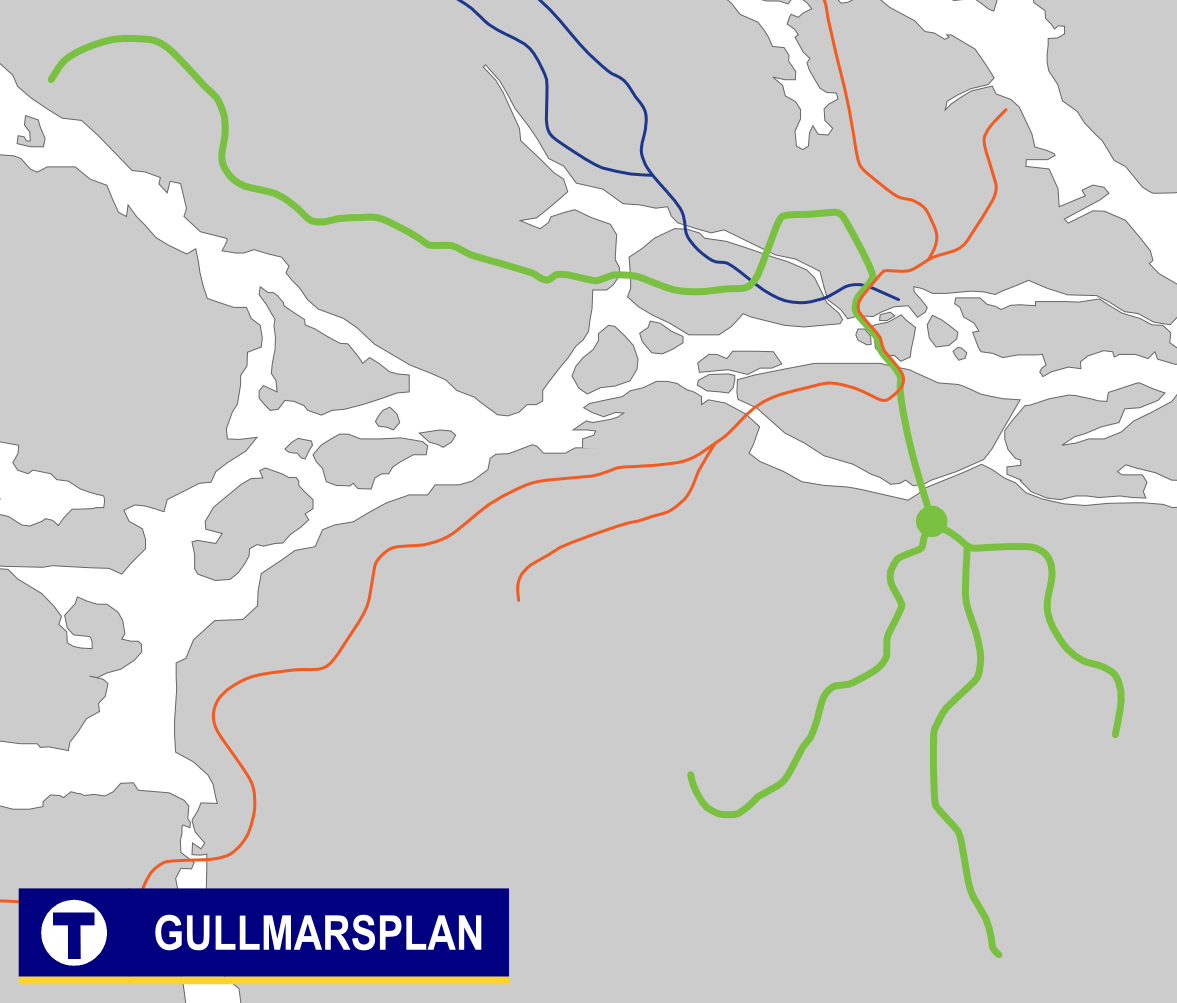

Gullmarsplan metro station is a station on the Green Line of the Stockholm Metro and the Tvärbanan light rail line, located by Gullmarsplan in Johanneshov, Söderort. The station was opened for trams in 1946 after the construction of Skanstullsbron, and converted to Metro usage on 1 October 1950 (on the first line from Slussen south to Hökarängen). On 9 September 1951, an extension south to Stureby was opened. The distance from Slussen is 2.3 km (1.4 mi).

Gullmarsplan is the busiest metro station in Söderort with 38,750 boarding passengers per day in 2019.

A new platform for the Blue Line will be added to Gullmarsplan station, as part of the project to transfer the Hagsätra branch of the Green line to the Blue Line. It will be situated underground 70 metres (230 ft) below the existing Green line platforms, and will therefore only be linked to the existing station by lifts (no escalators). The new platform will also have an exit (with escalators and lifts) to Mårtensdal in Hammarby sjöstad. Opening is planned for 2030.

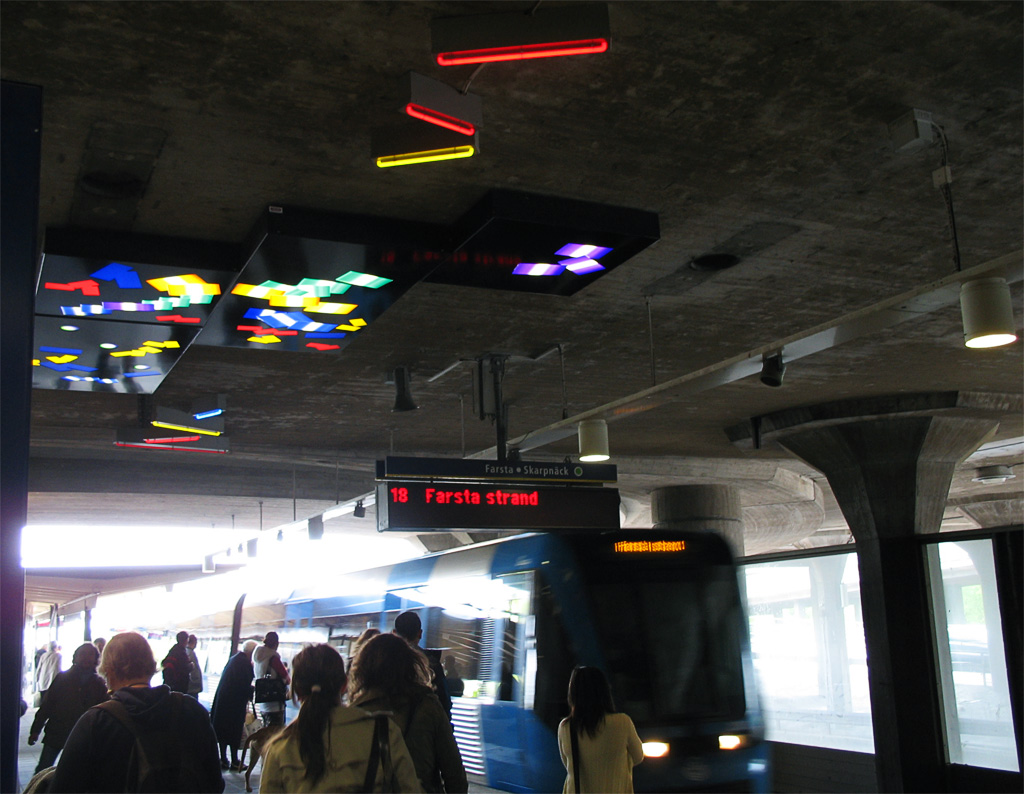
Gullmarsplan metro station
