= Hagsätra metro station =

Stockholm Metro station

Hagsätra
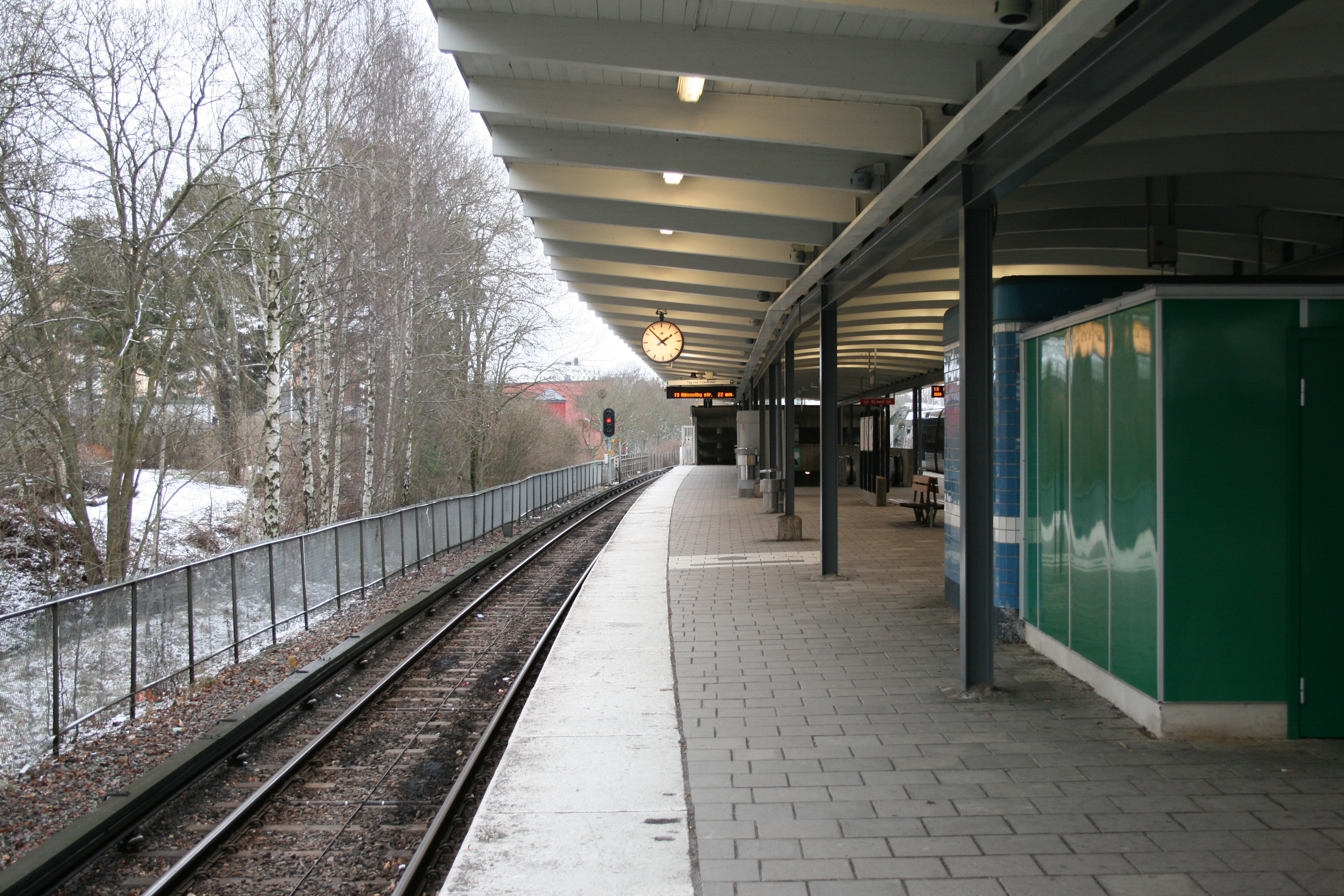

General information
- Coordinates: 59°15′44″N 18°0′44″E
- System: Stockholm Metro station
- Owner: Storstockholms Lokaltrafik
- Platforms: 1 island platform
- Tracks: 2

Construction
- Structure type: Elevated
- Accessible: Yes

Other information
- Station code: HAG

History
- Opened: 1 December 1960; 65 years ago

Passengers
- 2019: 4,850 boarding per weekday

Services
Preceding station	Stockholm Metro	Following station
Rågsved towards Hässelby strand	Line 19	Terminus
Location
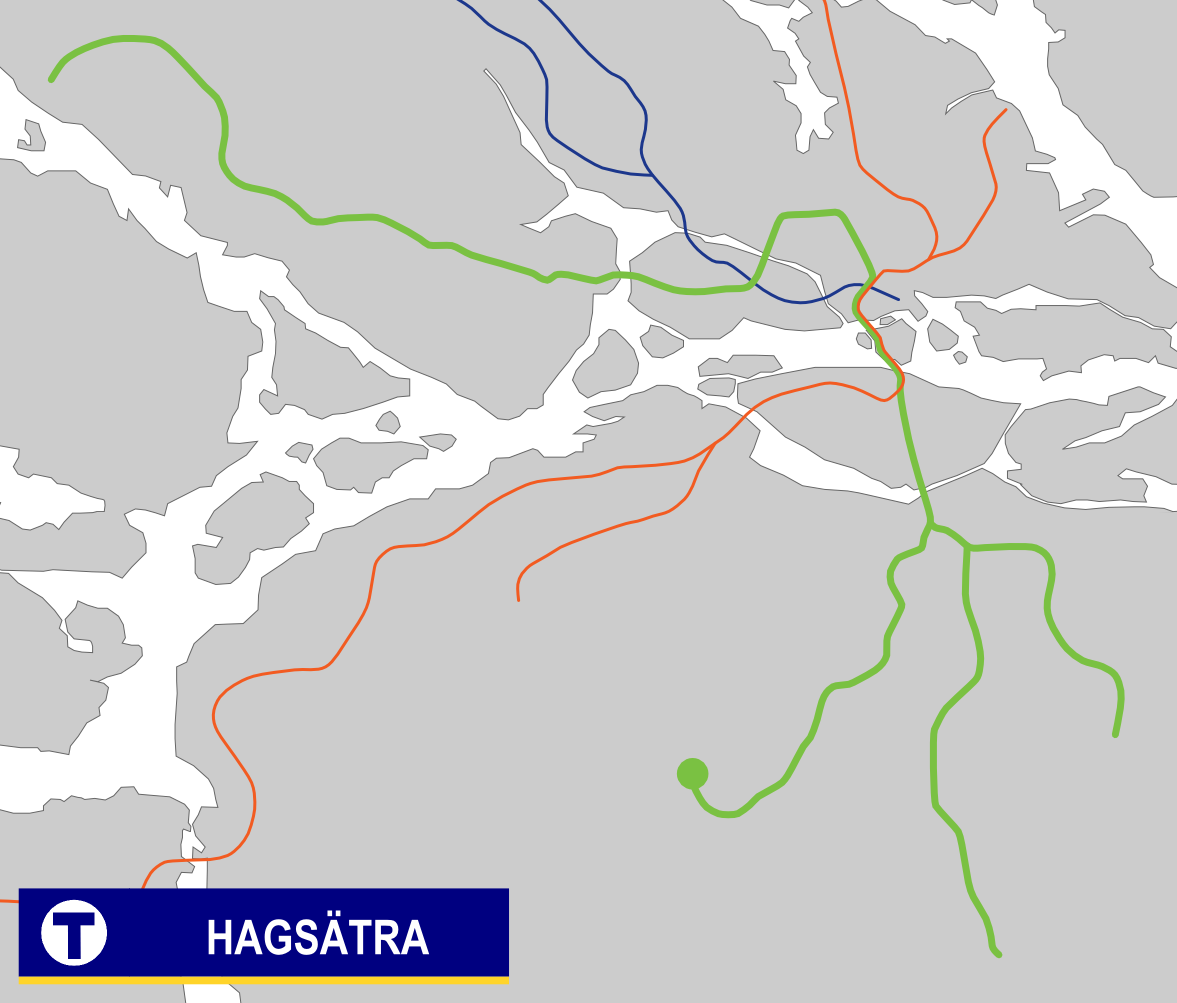

Hagsätra metro station is on the Green Line of the Stockholm Metro, located in Hagsätra, Söderort. It is the end station for Line 19. The station was inaugurated on 1 December 1960 when one-station extension from Rågsved was completed. The distance to Slussen is 10 km (6.2 mi).

A southerly extension of the Blue Line of the Stockholm Metro is currently under construction and expected to be opened for the passengers in 2030. As part of this development, the Blue line will take over this station.
