= Storstockholms Lokaltrafik =

Swedish transport company

Aktiebolaget Storstockholms Lokaltrafik
- Trade name: SL
- Native name: Storstockholms Lokaltrafik
- Type: Aktiebolag
- Industry: Transport
- Founded: 1916 as Stockholms Spårvägar; 1967 as SL
- Headquarters: Stockholm
- Area served: Stockholm County; Limited routes extending to: Uppsala County; Södermanland County
- Revenue: 19.269 billion SEK (roughly €1.88 billion)
- Owner: Region Stockholm
- Website: sl.se

Storstockholms Lokaltrafik known as SL, (lit. 'Greater Stockholm Local Transport') is the public transport organisation responsible for managing land-based public transport in Stockholm County, Sweden. SL oversees a network that includes the Tunnelbana metro, Pendeltåg commuter trains, buses, trams, local rail, and some ferry services.

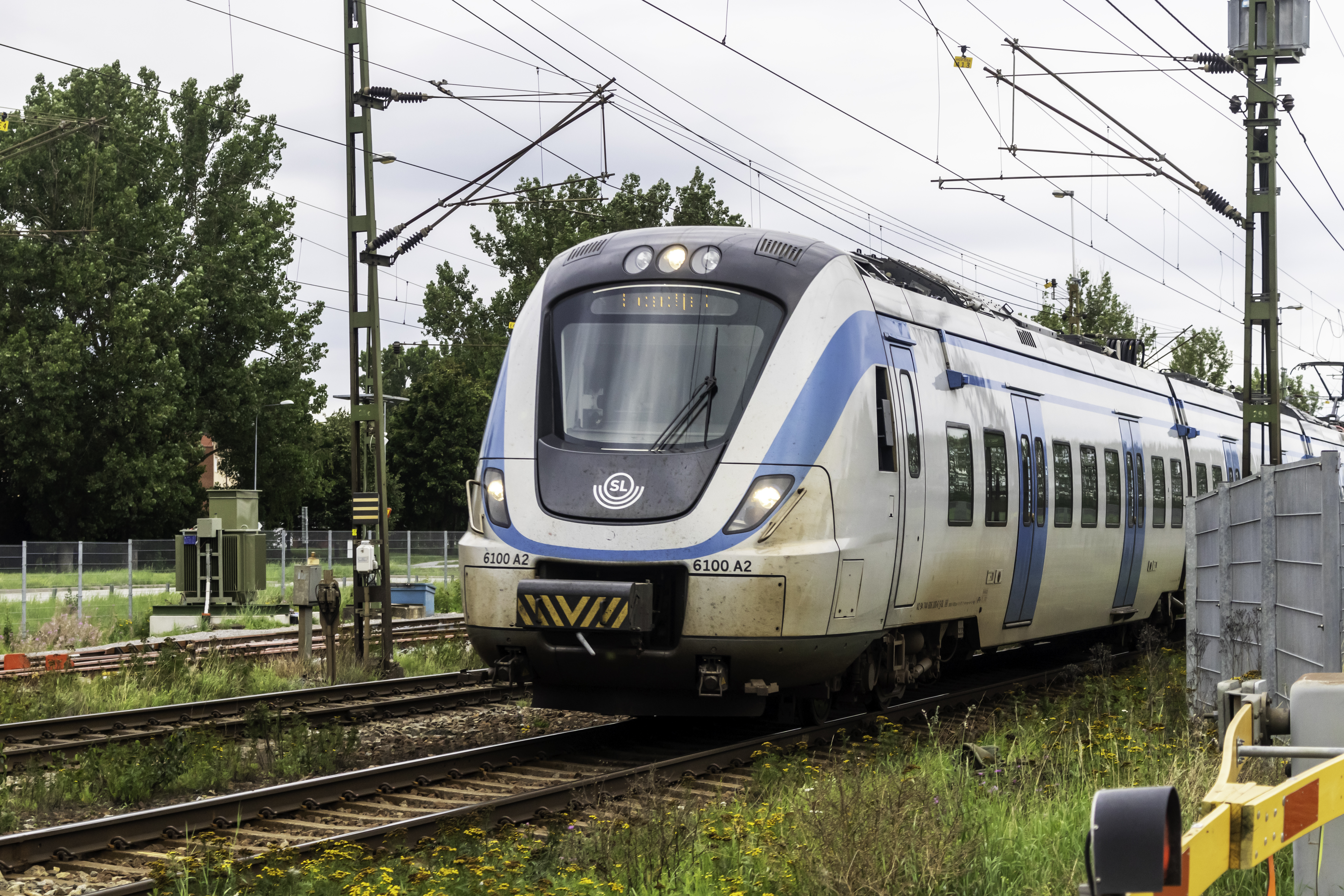
An SL Pendeltåg Commuter Train

SL's network serves approximately 700,000 daily passengers and is financed through a combination of regional taxes and fare revenues. The organisation operates under a unified ticketing system, and contracts with several private operators to run its services, including Transdev, SJ, VR Sverige, Keolis, and Stockholms Spårvägar.

== History ==
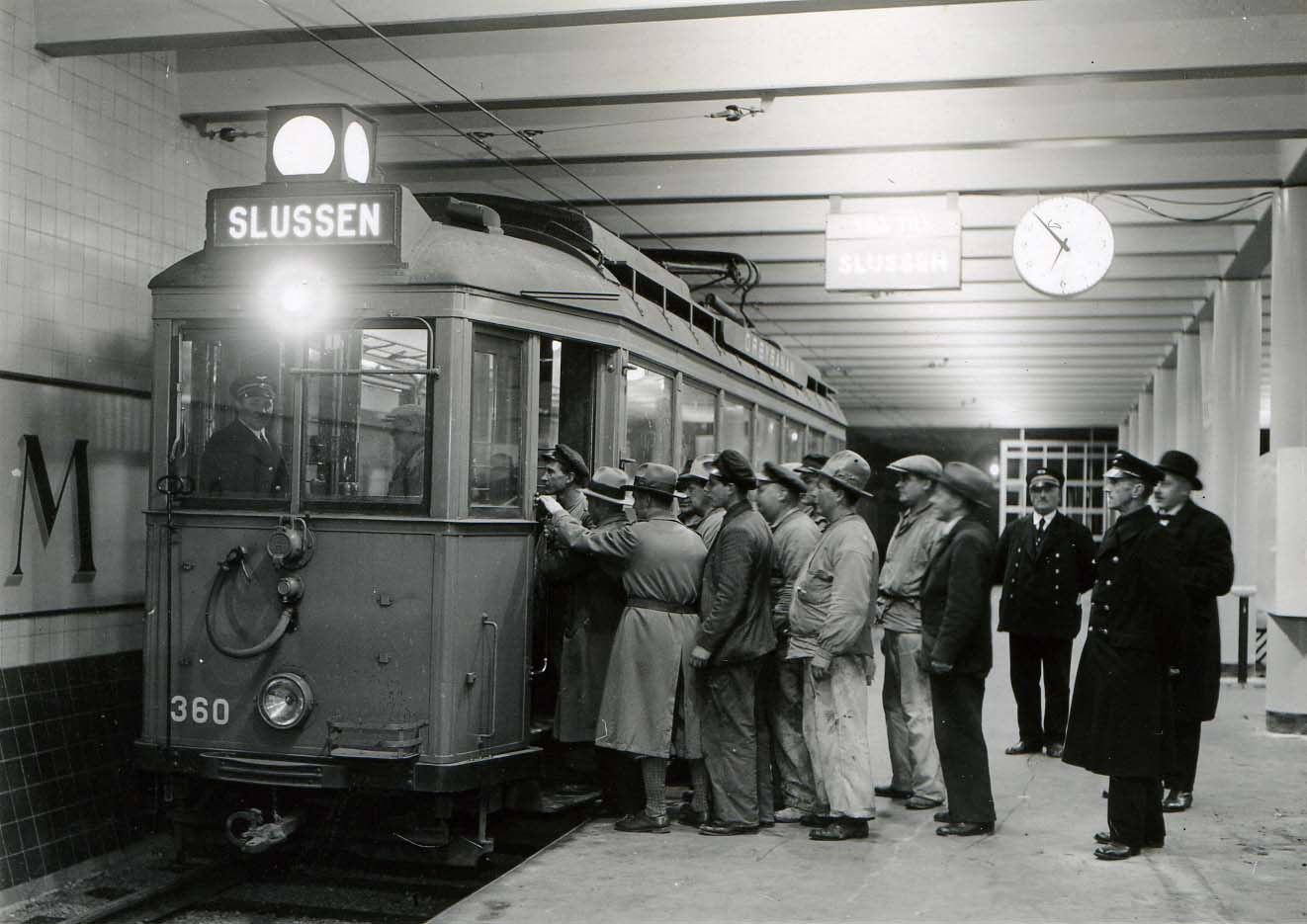
An underground tram operated by SS in 1930

SL has its origins in AB Stockholms Spårvägar (SS), a city-owned public transit company which started in 1915, by the City of Stockholm with the aim to deprivatise the two separate private tramway networks into one more efficient company. SS would in the late 1920s also acquire private motorbus companies. The first part of the Stockholm Metro was opened in 1950.

SS was renamed to SL in January 1967 when the metro, local train, and bus operations in Stockholm County were merged into a single organisation under the supervision of Stockholm County Council. The different mass transit systems within the County had until then been run by different organisations, Statens Järnvägar, private companies and companies owned by the local municipalities.

In 1993, SL began to use independent contractors for the operation and maintenance of the different transport systems. For bus traffic the operators own the buses, but for rail bound traffic SL own the trains, and the contractors operate them.

Since 2012, the county council's (now Region Stockholm) traffic board and traffic administration is the regional public transport authority responsible for public transport. SL now serves as a brand name for public transport services provided by various contractors on behalf of the traffic administration. The limited company AB Storstockholms Lokaltrafik still exists and manages (apart from the brand) certain contracts and assets.

== Services ==
SL oversees the public transport network in Stockholm County, but also some services extending to the neighbouring Uppsala and Södermanland counties. Since 1993 SL has used contract operators for the operation of services.

Stockholm Metro: The Tunnelbana metro consists of three main lines: the Red Line, Green Line, and Blue Line.

Commuter Train: The Pendeltåg commuter train system connects central Stockholm with the wider county, operating on two main branches with six route lines.

Local Railways:

- Roslagsbanan: A narrow-gauge railway serving north-eastern suburbs.
- Saltsjöbanan: A railway line that connects Slussen with Saltsjöbaden.

Light Rail Lines:

- Lidingöbanan: A light rail line linking the island of Lidingö to the mainland.
- Tvärbanan: A semi-circular orbital route passing west of the city.
- Nockebybanan: A feeder light rail line linking western suburbs to the Stockholm metro.
- Spårväg City: A tram line connecting the city centre with Djurgården.

SL Buses: A network of approximately 500 bus routes serving the Stockholm area.

Commuter Ferry: Five Pendelbåt ferry lines connecting the city centre with locations in the archipelago and Lake Mälaren.

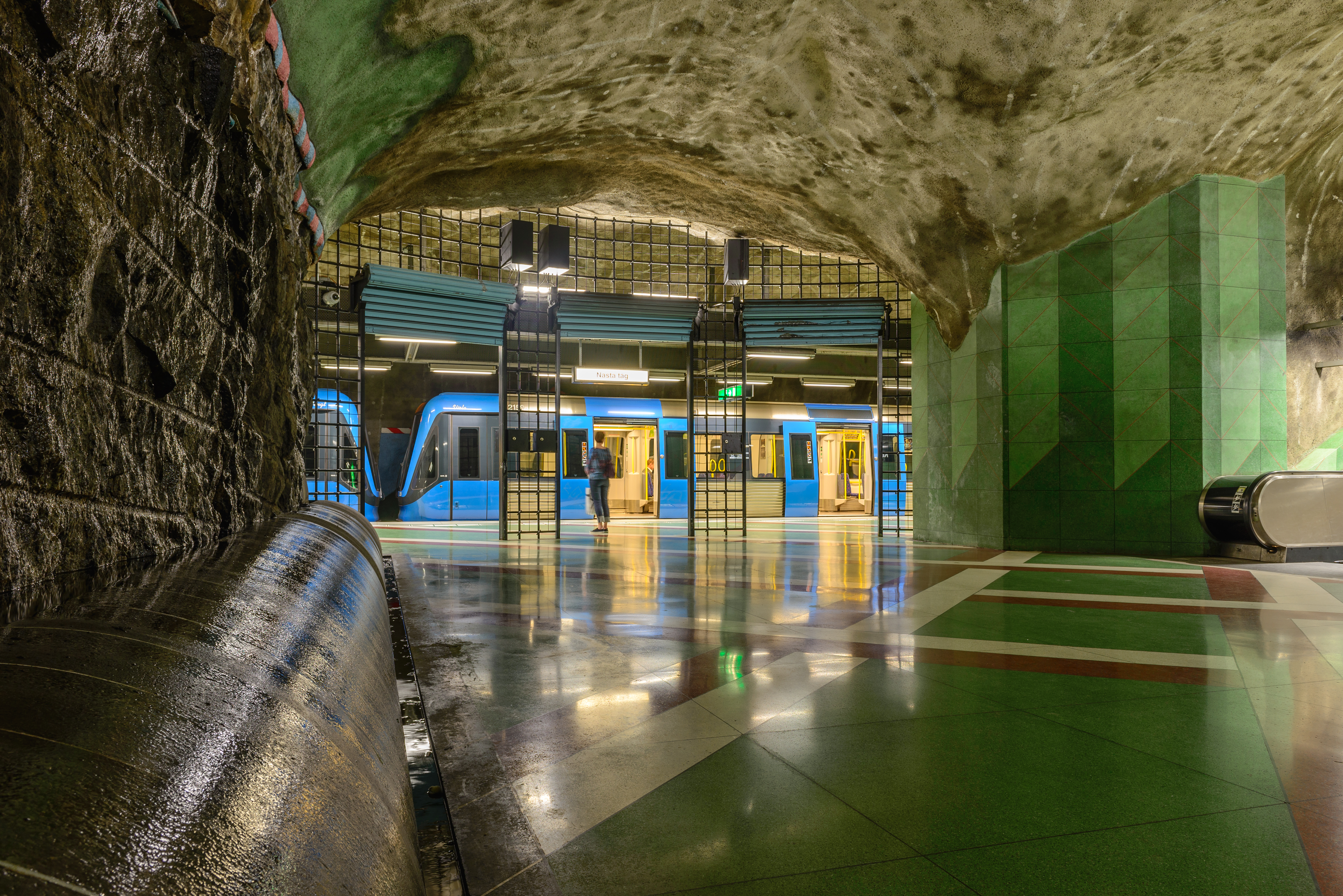
Metro waiting at Kungsträdgården metro station

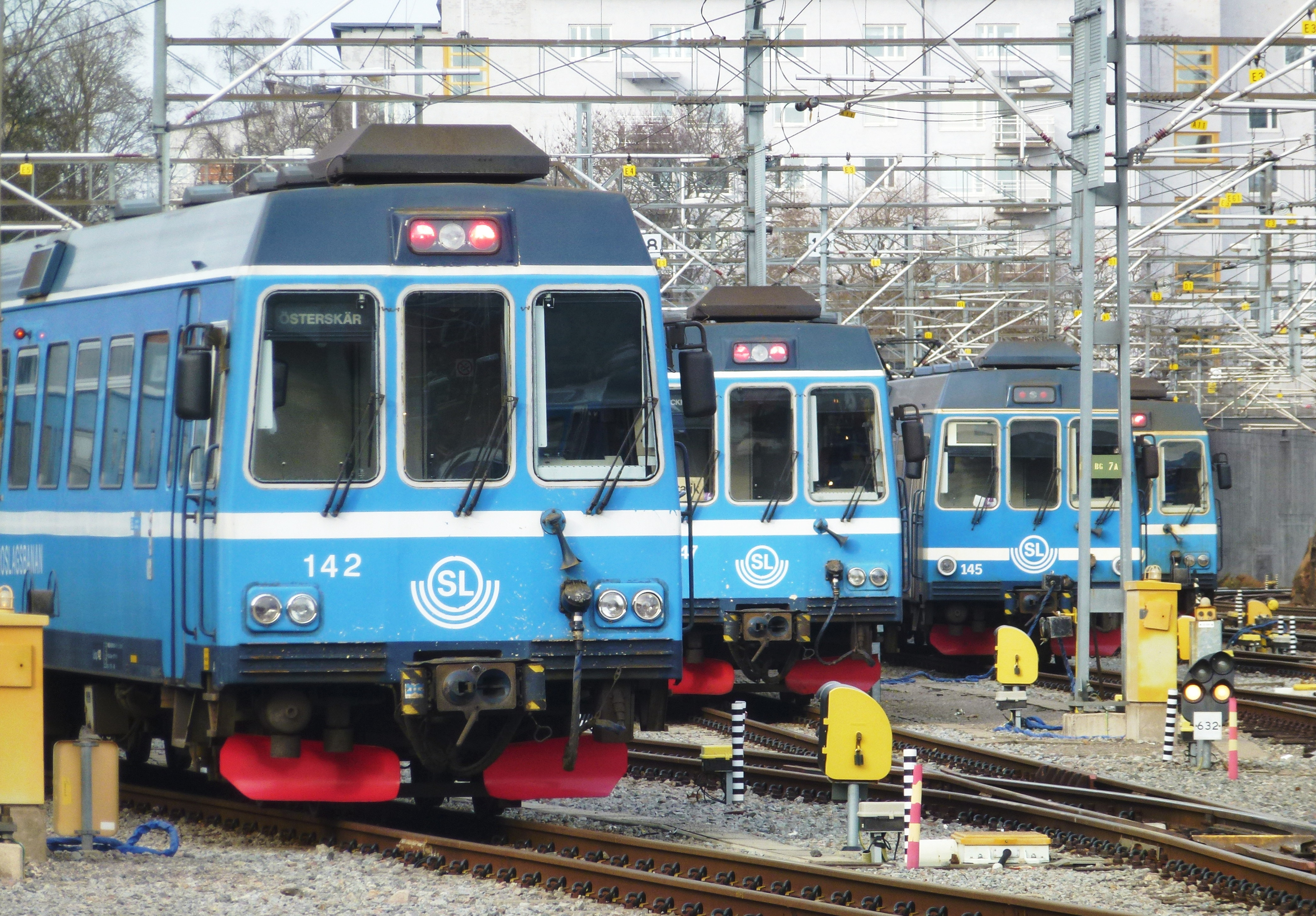
Roslagsbanan trains

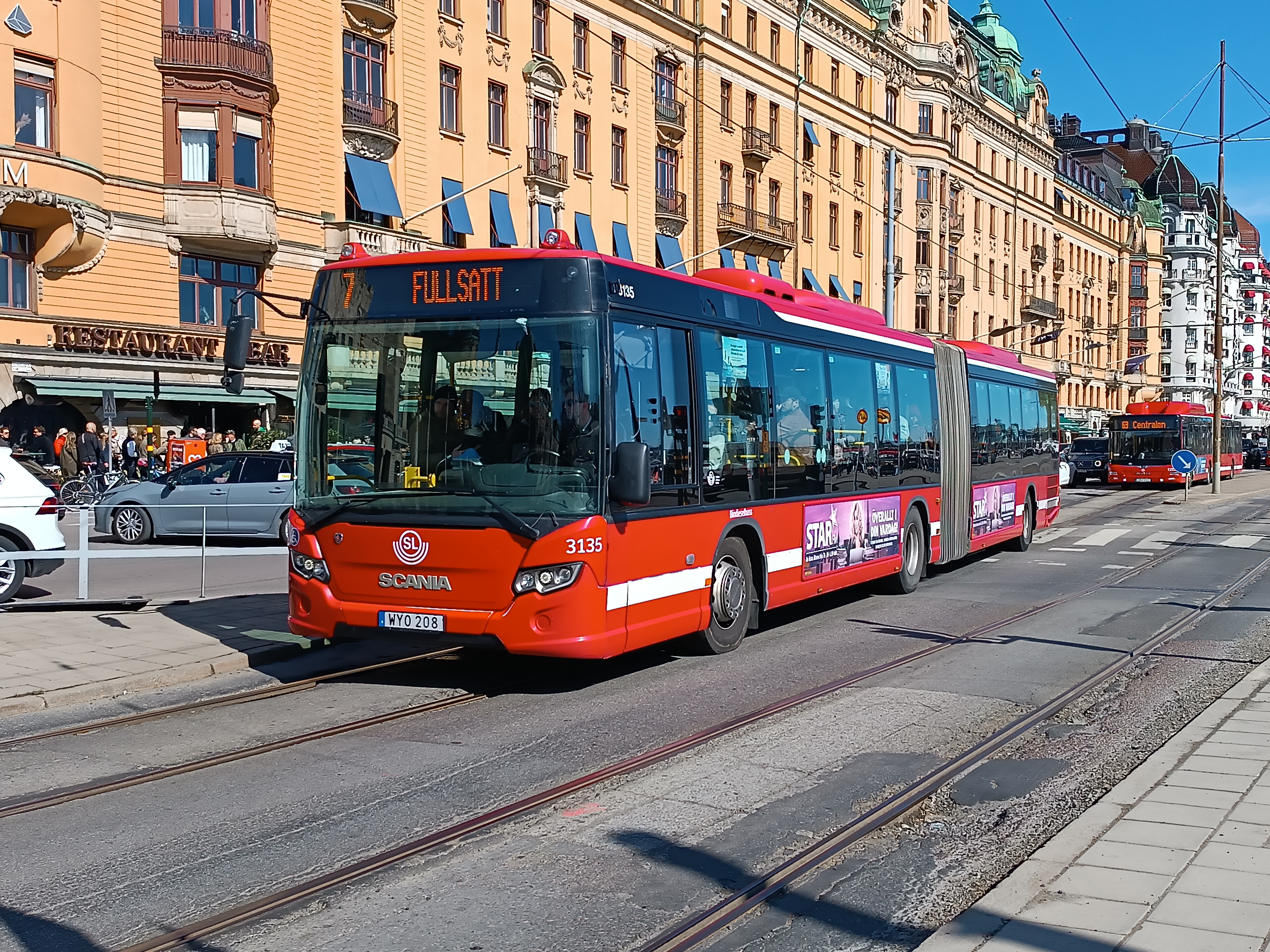
Buses in Stockholm

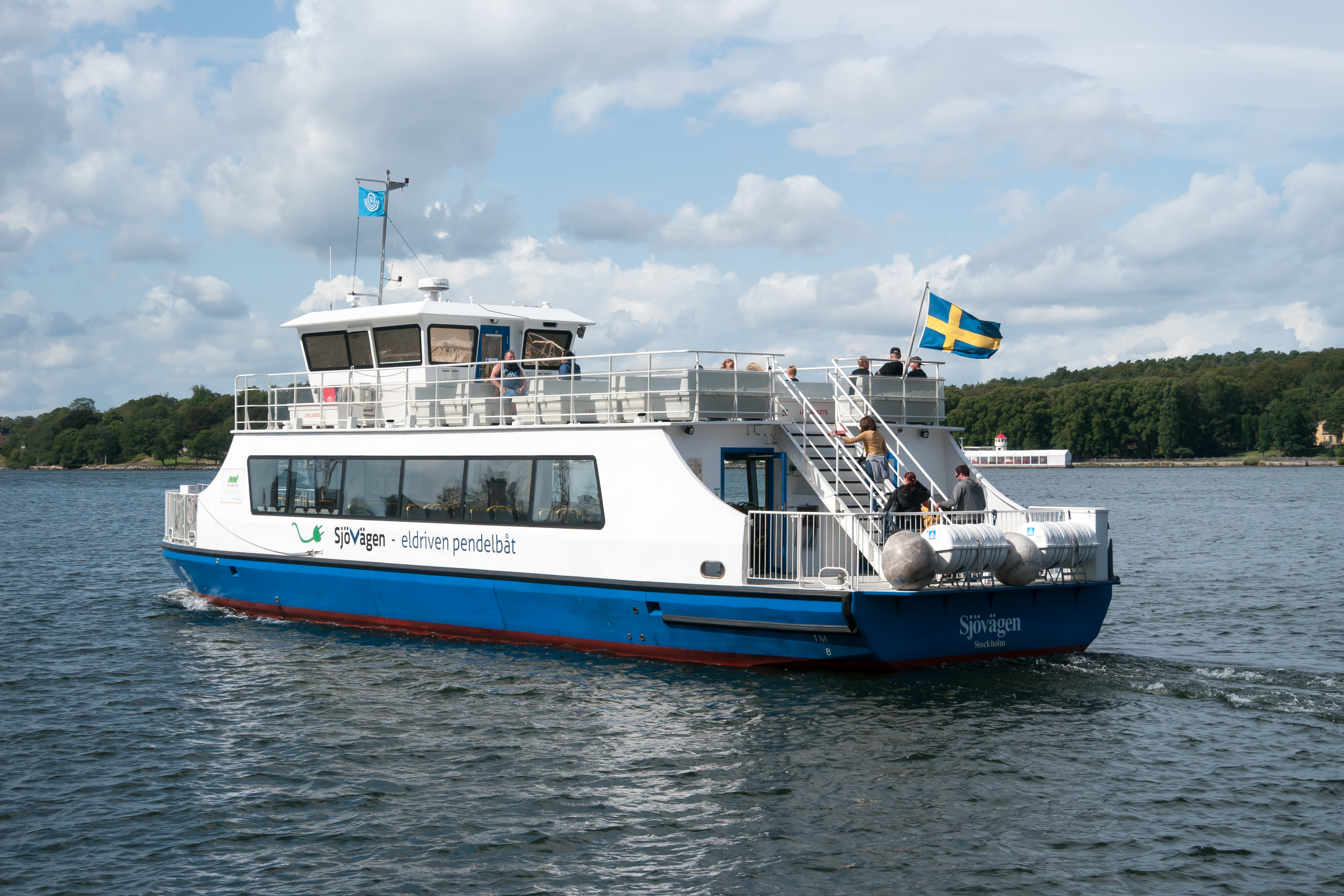
Pendelbåt boat operated for SL

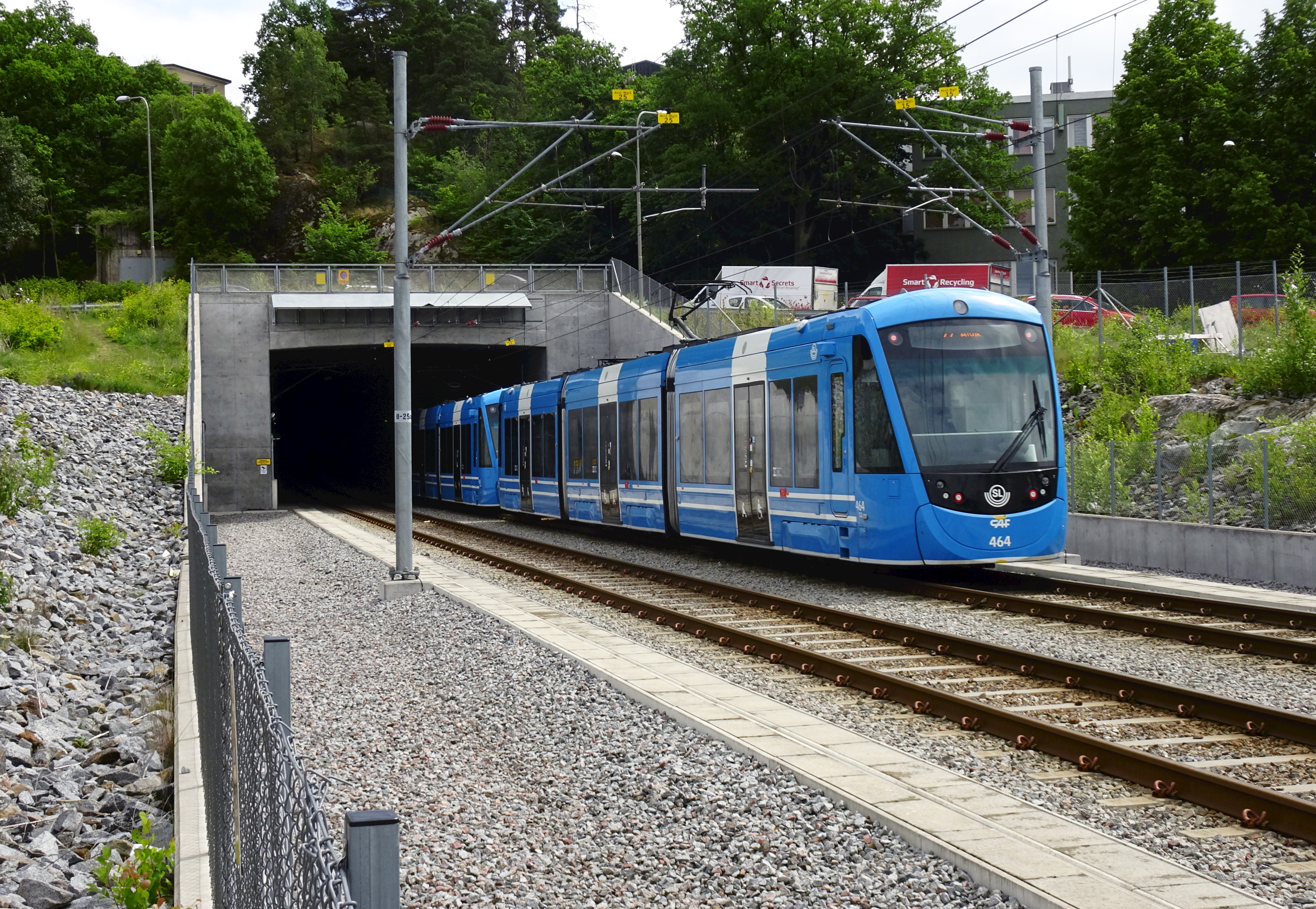
Tvärbanan tram

== Ticketing ==
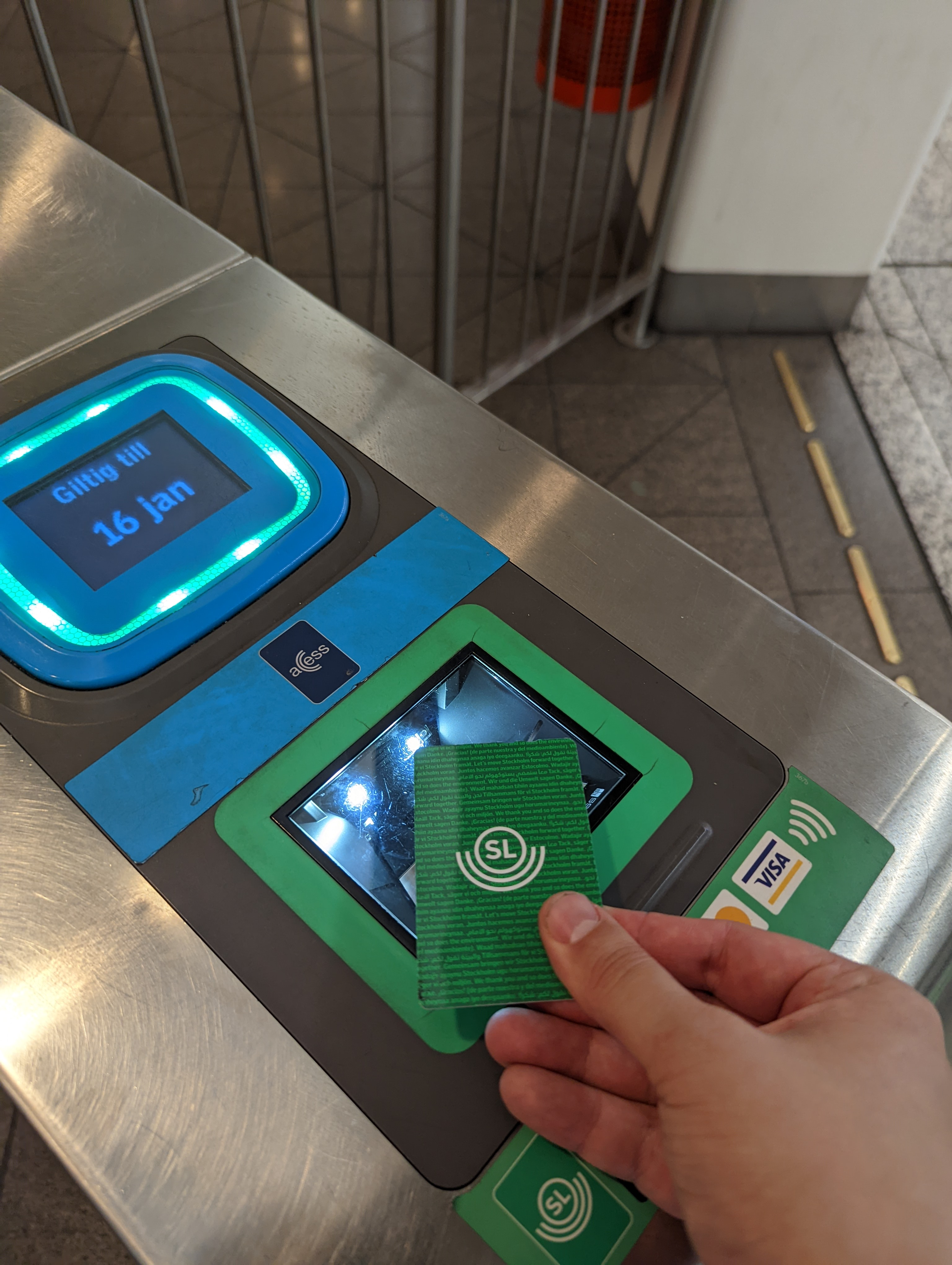
An SL Card being validated at a ticket barrier

Fares for SL are determined by political agreement at Region Stockholm. SL operates under a unified ticketing system that employs multiple methods for fare collection and validation. This system includes ticket barriers at metro and some commuter rail stations, on-vehicle validation for buses, some trams and local rail vehicles, and off-vehicle validation at certain stations or platform. SL also uses ticket inspectors who conduct checks.

SL introduced its first smart card system called SL Access in 2009, replacing its previous magnetic farecards system. The system was procured from Australian company Vix Technology under a contract signed in 2003.

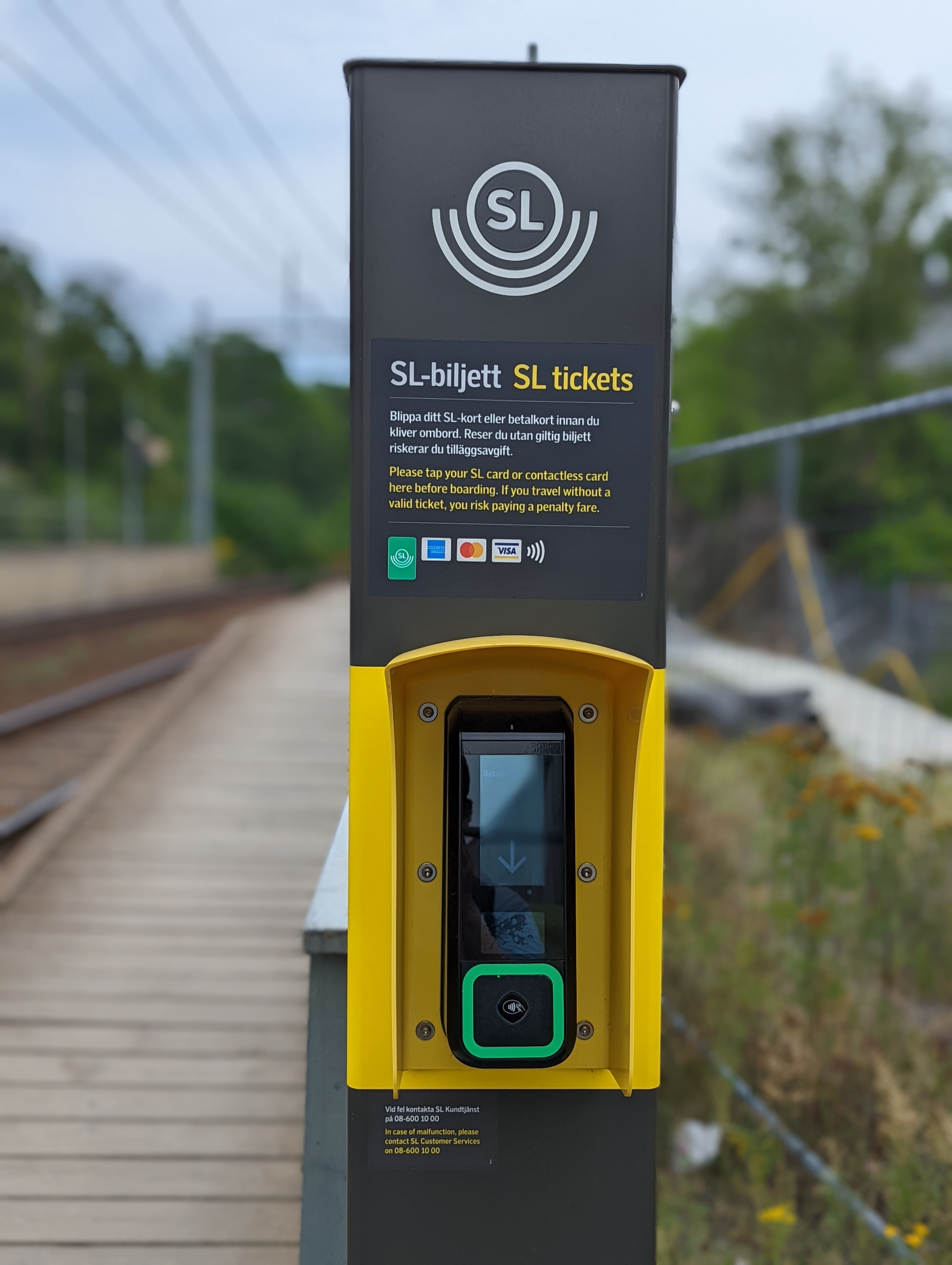
SL Ticket validator

The SL Access system was phased out between 2021 and 2023 in favour of a new fare collection system. This new system includes the green SL Card, and also supports direct contactless payments, and paperless QR code tickets purchased from the official SL mobile app. SL phased out ticket machines on its network in 2022.

As of 2024, SL has two main forms of tickets used for public transport within Stockholm County.

- Travelcard: valid during a specified period of time, between 24 hours and one year.
- Single journey ticket: Valid for 75 minutes from the moment of activation. It can be purchased and loaded onto an SL smart card, obtained through the SL app, or acquired via contactless payment at a ticket gate or validator.

Special fares apply to some SL journeys. Due an exit fare levied by the privately operated Arlanda Line, fares for Arlanda Central Station are higher than typical SL journeys. Commuter train journeys from Stockholm County to Uppsala or Knivsta require an Uppsala County (UL) ticket in addition to the standard SL ticket.

=== Waxholmsbolaget ===
The majority of ferry traffic within the Stockholm Archipelago is handled by Waxholmsbolaget, a separate company also owned by Region Stockholm. Waxholmsbolaget and SL offer shared ticketing options, allowing the use of some SL tickets on their services during certain periods.

== Contractors ==
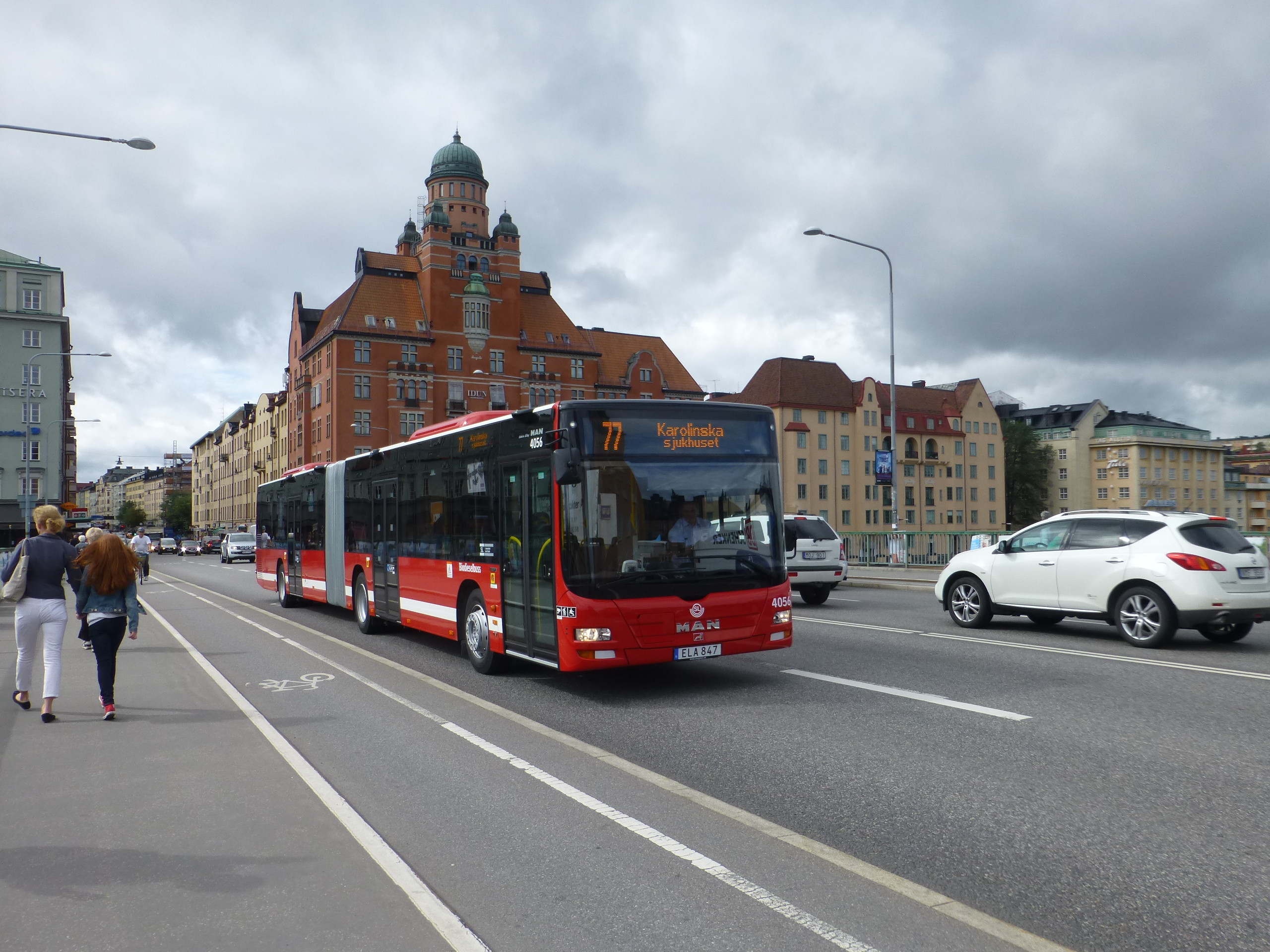
Keolis-owned articulated MAN Lion's City bus with SL branding

The contractors used by SL are as of September 2025 the following:

- VR Sverige
  - Bus traffic in Ekerö, Tyresö
  - Replacement bus traffic for Saltsjöbanan
- Keolis
  - Bus traffic in Stockholm City Centre, Lidingö, Nacka, Salem, Sollentuna, Solna, Sundbyberg and Västerort.
- Transdev
  - Bus traffic in Danderyd, Norrtälje, Sigtuna, Täby, Upplands Väsby, Vallentuna, Vaxholm and Österåker.
  - Rail traffic on Roslagsbanan.
- Connecting Stockholm
  - Stockholm Metro
- SJ Stockholmståg
  - Stockholm commuter rail
- Nobina
  - Bus traffic in Botkyrka, Haninge, Huddinge, Järfälla, Nacka, Nykvarn, Nynäshamn, Salem, Södertälje, Värmdö and Upplands-Bro.
- Stockholms Spårvägar
  - Spårväg City
  - Lidingöbanan
  - Nockebybanan
  - Saltsjöbanan
  - Tvärbanan

== See also ==
- Transport in Stockholm
- Region Stockholm
- Skånetrafiken
- UL
- SJ
