= Söderort =

Southern suburban part of the Stockholm Municipality, Sweden

Coordinates: 59°16′04″N 18°02′05″E

Map of the boroughs of the City of Stockholm, with Söderort circled in red.

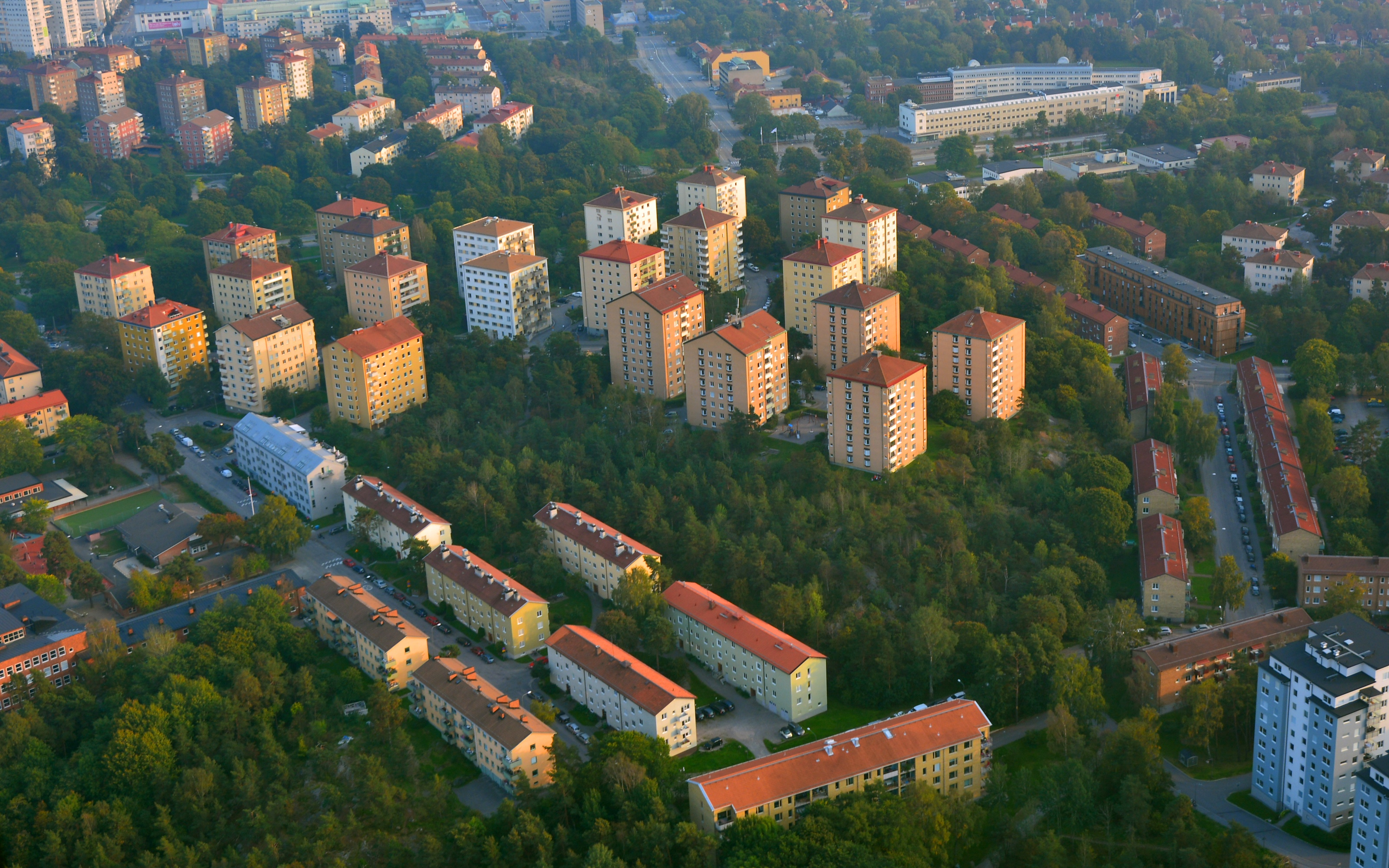
Typical 1940-era homes in Årsta. Picture south with Slakthusområdet and the Globe area to the left of the top edge.

Söderort (lit. 'The Southern Municipality', sometimes translated as South Stockholm) is the southern suburban part of the Stockholm Municipality, Sweden, located within the city limits of Stockholm.

== Geography ==
Söderort is situated in the northern part of the Södertörn peninsula. The boroughs of Söderort are Enskede-Årsta-Vantör, Farsta, Hägersten-Liljeholmen, Skärholmen, Skarpnäck, and Älvsjö.

== History ==
The majority of Söderort was annexed by the City of Stockholm in 1913.

Prior to 2007, it was organised into eight stadsdelsområden: Enskede-Årsta, Farsta, Hägersten, Liljeholmen, Skarpnäck, Skärholmen, Vantör, and Älvsjö.

Since 2007, Söderort is organised into six stadsdelsområden (sometimes translated to boroughs): Enskede-Årsta-Vantör, Farsta, Hägersten-Liljeholmen, Skarpnäck, Skärholmen, and Älvsjö.

== Districts ==
District	Area¹	Population (31-12-2007)	Density²	Pre-2007 borough	Borough
Aspudden	1.17	8,038	69	Liljeholmen	Hägersten-Liljeholmen
Axelsberg-Stensborg, (Hägersten)	1.88	7,311	39	Hägersten, Liljeholmen	Hägersten-Liljeholmen
Bagarmossen	1.98	10,264	52	Skarpnäck	Skarpnäck
Bandhagen	0.82	5,417	66	Vantör	Enskede-Årsta-Vantör
Björkhagen	1.39	5,695	41	Skarpnäck	Skarpnäck
Blåsut	0.15	119	8	Enskede-Årsta	Enskede-Årsta-Vantör
Bredäng	2.13	9,266	44	Skärholmen	Skärholmen
Enskede gård	0.86	2,812	33	Enskede-Årsta	Enskede-Årsta-Vantör
Enskededalen	0.67	2,253	34	Skarpnäck	Skarpnäck
Enskedefältet	1.05	1,373	13	Enskede-Årsta	Enskede-Årsta-Vantör
Fagersjö	1.73	2,485	15	Farsta	Farsta
Farsta	2.42	11,232	46	Farsta	Farsta
Farsta strand	1.49	5,132	34	Farsta	Farsta
Farstanäset	0.42	0	0	Farsta	Farsta
Flaten	2.33	8	0	Skarpnäck	Skarpnäck
Fruängen	1.29	6,571	52	Hägersten	Hägersten-Liljeholmen
Gamla Enskede	2.96	10,013	34	Enskede-Årsta	Enskede-Årsta-Vantör
Gröndal	0.90	7,193	80	Liljeholmen	Hägersten-Liljeholmen
Gubbängen	1.77	4,800	27	Farsta	Farsta
Hagsätra	1.71	8,253	48	Vantör	Enskede-Årsta-Vantör
Herrängen	1.36	3,361	25	Älvsjö	Älvsjö
Hägerstensåsen	0.87	6,653	76	Hägersten	Hägersten-Liljeholmen
Högdalen	2.04	8,006	40	Vantör	Enskede-Årsta-Vantör
Hökarängen	1.44	8,109	56	Farsta	Farsta
Johanneshov	1.30	5,778	44	Enskede-Årsta	Enskede-Årsta-Vantör
Kärrtorp	1.04	3,799	37	Skarpnäck	Skarpnäck
Larsboda	1.20	1,299	11	Farsta	Farsta
Liljeholmen	1.69	6,729	40	Liljeholmen	Hägersten-Liljeholmen
Liseberg	0.38	1,308	34	Älvsjö	Älvsjö
Långbro	1.94	5,799	30	Älvsjö	Älvsjö
Långsjö	1.06	2,655	25	Älvsjö	Älvsjö
Midsommarkransen	0.98	8,771	90	Liljeholmen	Hägersten-Liljeholmen
Mälarhöjden	1.42	4,194	30	Hägersten	Hägersten-Liljeholmen
Orhem	1.95	78	0	Skarpnäck	Skarpnäck
Rågsved	1.97	10,301	52	Vantör	Enskede-Årsta-Vantör
Skarpnäcks Gård	2.83	10,348	37	Skarpnäck	Skarpnäck
Skrubba	2.28	19	0	Skarpnäck	Skarpnäck
Skärholmen	1.95	7,961	41	Skärholmen	Skärholmen
Sköndal	2.73	7,199	26	Farsta	Farsta
Solberga	1.87	6,800	36	Älvsjö	Älvsjö
Stureby	2.06	6,870	34	Enskede-Årsta	Enskede-Årsta-Vantör
Svedmyra	0.94	2,799	30	Farsta	Farsta
Sätra	2.79	6,352	23	Skärholmen	Skärholmen
Tallkrogen	1.24	3,971	32	Farsta	Farsta
Vårberg	1.97	8,454	43	Skärholmen	Skärholmen
Västberga	2.04	3,727	18	Liljeholmen	Hägersten-Liljeholmen
Västertorp	0.81	5,579	69	Hägersten	Hägersten-Liljeholmen
Årsta	2.56	15,851	62	Enskede-Årsta	Enskede-Årsta-Vantör
Älvsjö	2.02	934	5	Älvsjö	Älvsjö
Örby	1.60	4,850	30	Vantör	Enskede-Årsta-Vantör
Örby slott	0.67	1,681	25	Älvsjö	Älvsjö
Örnsberg SV	0.05	285	57	Liljeholmen	Hägersten-Liljeholmen
Östberga	1.93	5,015	26	Enskede-Årsta	Enskede-Årsta-Vantör
Östra Hammarbyhöjden	1.03	8,024	78	Skarpnäck	Skarpnäck
Total	83.13	293,387	35

1/ km²
2/ Population per hectare

== See also ==
- Stockholm City Centre
- Västerort
- Södertörn
