= Enskede =

Enskede may refer to

- Enskede (locality), a locality in Stockholm, Sweden
- Enskede-Årsta (1998–2007), merged into the borough below
- Enskede-Årsta-Vantör (formed 2007), a borough in Stockholm, Sweden
  - Gamla Enskede, a district in the borough above
  - Enskede gård, a district in the borough above
- Enskededalen, a district in Skarpnäck borough, Stockholm, Sweden

== Sports ==
- Enskede IK, football team in Gamla Enskede

== See also ==
- South Stockholm
- Enschede, a city in the eastern Netherlands
