= Berit Lindholm =

Swedish soprano (1934–2023)

- Lindholm in the 1960s
- Born: Berit Maria Jonsson; 18 October 1934; Stockholm, Sweden
- Died: 12 August 2023 (aged 88); Sköndal, South Stockholm, Sweden
- Occupation: Dramatic soprano
- Organizations: Royal Swedish Opera; Bayreuth Festival; Deutsche Oper am Rhein
- Title: Hovsångerska
- Awards: Litteris et Artibus

Berit Maria Lindholm (née Jonsson; 18 October 1934 – 12 August 2023) was a Swedish dramatic soprano. She was first based at the Royal Swedish Opera and made an international career, performing at the Royal Opera House in London, the Bayreuth Festival and the Vienna State Opera, among many others. She is regarded as one of the greatest Wagner singers of her generation.

She was in demand for a rather small repertoire of roles, especially Wagner's Brünnhilde and Isolde, and Chrysothemis by Richard Strauss. Looking "slender and athletic", she was also regarded as "an unusually convincing actor". In 1971, she appeared as Isolde at the Bolshoi Theatre in Moscow in a pioneering tour of the Vienna State Opera.

== Life and career ==
Berit Maria Jonsson was born in Stockholm on 18 June 1934 to Nils Jonsson, a civil servant, and Elisabet, née Carlsson. She studied in Stockholm to become a primary school teacher. During her student years she appeared in operas, including Gluck's Iphigenia in Aulis in 1954, performed at the Drottningholm Palace Theatre, and Monteverdi's L'incoronazione di Poppea. She took her primary school teacher and cantor examinations in 1957, and then taught for four years, while taking private singing lessons. From 1961 to 1963 she studied voice at the Royal College of Music with Britta von Vegesack and Käthe Sandström.

=== Royal Swedish Opera ===
Berit Jonsson made her debut at the Royal Swedish Opera in 1963 as Countess Almaviva in Mozart's Le nozze di figaro; Göran Gentele was general manager, and Michael Gielen music director. After a short time, she stepped in as Helmwige in Wagner's Die Walküre, and was discovered as a dramatic soprano. She then appeared in leading roles, such as Leonore in Beethoven's Fidelio, Verdi's Aida and in 1964 both Venus in Wagner's Tannhäuser and Puccini's Tosca. She was Chrysothemis in Elektra by Richard Strauss in 1965, alongside Birgit Nilsson in the title role, who recommended her to the Vienna State Opera and to the Royal Opera House. Nilsson also recommended the vocal teacher Daniel Ferro in New York to her, who taught a technique of deep and low breathing.

In 1967, Lindholm was invited by conductor Leopold Stokowski to sing the final scene from Götterdämmerung (Brünnhilde's 'Immolation' scene) in a Wagner concert with the London Symphony Orchestra at the Royal Festival Hall in London, only four years after her debut, and before she ever performed the role completely on stage. A reviewer of the recording noted in 2002 that she had "a richly nuanced voice, a deep dramatic soprano with a resonant bottom extension capable of considerable projection. She sustains the length of her scene with insight and is often unerringly beautiful". Stokowski invited her to perform the scene again at Carnegie Hall in New York City two years later.

She first performed Wagner's Isolde in Stockholm in 1967, after preparing herself for the role for eight months without taking other engagements. In 1968 she performed as Abigaille in Verdi's Nabucco. She was a member of the ensemble of the Royal Swedish Opera until 1972, but still appeared as a guest, including in the title role of Salome by Richard Strauss in a 1982 production directed by Göran Järvefelt. She interpreted the character not as deranged or neurotic, but saw Salome and Jokanaan as the only "normal" people at Herod’s court, Salome setting her hopes on the man as a way to escape it. She performed the role of Klytemnestra in Elektra in 1990, one of few to perform all leading roles of that opera on stage; she described the character as rewarding because she has "so many problems and anxieties". She appeared as Alfa in the world premiere of Backanterna by Daniel Börtz, an opera after The Bacchae by Euripedes, on 2 November 1991.

=== Deutsche Oper am Rhein ===
Lindholm became a member at the Deutsche Oper am Rhein in Düsseldorf and Duisburg, but remained a resident in Sweden during her international career. The company staged a Ring cycle regularly two or three times per year, conducted by Peter Schneider, with singers such as the mezzo-soprano Gwendolyn Killebrew, the tenor Manfred Jung, and the baritones Simon Estes and Norman Bailey. Lindholm performed there also as Isolde, alongside Jung as Tristan, and Salome. She first performed the title role of Elektra there in 1983. She participated in the world premiere of Alexander Goehr's Die Wiedertäufer on 19 April 1985.

=== Royal Opera House ===
Lindholm first performed at the Royal Opera House in London as Chrysothemis in 1966, stepping in for Mane Collier. A critic wrote: "Tall, and remarkably slim for so epic a voice, Miss Lindholm is clearly marked out for greatness". She returned for Isolde, Brünnhilde in Wagner's Der Ring des Nibelungen staged by Götz Friedrich and conducted by Colin Davis, and for Chrysothemis again between 1973 and 1975.

As Brünnhilde, she alternated with Gwyneth Jones, the singer of the role in the Jahrhundertring in Bayreuth from 1976; Wotan was portrayed by Donald McIntyre. Lindholm's costumes were exhibited at the opera house in 2007. Designed by the Swedish Ingrid Rosell, they were mostly made from leather, obviously for a slender person, defying "the comic-book depictions of a heavyweight, armour-clad, helmeted Wagnerian diva".

In 1971, Lindholm rescued a Ring cycle at Opera Scotland; booked for a preliminary performance of Götterdämmerung, she returned a week later to step in for Siegfried and Götterdämmerung. She also appeared at the 1974 Edinburgh Festival with a production of Elektra by the Royal Swedish Opera.

=== Bayreuth Festival ===
Lindholm made her debut at the Bayreuth Festival in 1967 as Venus in Tannhäuser, in the last year of a production directed by Wieland Wagner and conducted by Berislav Klobučar. She returned the following year to perform as Brünnhilde in the Ring production directed by Wieland Wagner and conducted by Lorin Maazel; she was Brünnhilde in Die Walküre and Siegfried, but the Third Norne in Götterdämmerung, while Gladys Kuchta performed Brünnhilde. In the new production of 1970, directed by Wolfgang Wagner and conducted by Horst Stein, she was Brünnhilde in all three parts of the cycle, repeated in 1971 and 1973. She appeared at the Oper Zürich in 1967 as Kundry in Wagner's Parsifal.

=== Vienna State Opera ===
Lindholm performed regularly at the Vienna State Opera, from 1967 as Elsa in Wagner's Lohengrin, Leonore, Chrysothemis and Tosca, from 1968 as Brünnhilde, and from 1970 as Isolde. In 1971, during the Cold War, the company's production of Tristan und Isolde toured to the Bolshoi Theatre in Moscow, as the climax of a visit which also included Le nozze di Figaro and Der Rosenkavalier by Richard Strauss. Jess Thomas appeared as Tristan and the performances were conducted by Karl Böhm and Heinrich Hollreiser. Lindholm was proud to have been the first Isolde in the Soviet Union, and enthusiastically recalled the audiences, who lavished her with hundreds of bouquets of "tiny, tiny bunches of little flowers". One gentleman's tearful response to her performance brought her to tears.

=== North America and others ===
Lindholm performed the role of Amelia in Verdi's Un ballo in maschera at the Opéra de Montréal in 1967. She appeared as Sieglinde in Die Walküre only once, at the San Francisco Opera in 1972, with Nilsson as Brünnhilde and Jess Thomas as Siegmund. She made her debut at the Metropolitan Opera in New York City as Brünnhilde in Die Walküre in 1975, now with Nilsson as Sieglinde. When Göran Gentele became general manager there, he planned her to perform the role of Cassandre in Les Troyens by Hector Berlioz, but the project failed due to his sudden death.

She appeared as Isolde at the Liceu in Barcelona and the Opera de Paris in 1972, and at the Dutch National Opera in Amsterdam in 1974. She performed the title role of Puccini's Turandot at the Cologne Opera conducted by Nello Santi. At the Opéra de Marseille, she performed as Salome in 1980, alongside Bent Norup as Jochanaan, and in 1983 the title role of Elektra She appeared as the Dyer's Wife in Die Frau ohne Schatten by Richard Strauss at the Theater Bremen in 1991.

Lindholm retired in 1995.

=== Personal life ===
She married Hans Lindholm (1932–2011), a laryngologist, in 1964. They had two daughters.

In Bayreuth, instead of "diva transport", she got around on a bicycle that her colleague Theo Adam had named Grane, like Brünnhilde's horse. An interviewer described her in as a "generous and unpretentious lady with a wry sense of humour, able to look back on her career philosophically and with a disarming perception of what she had achieved and also what not". When he asked her for what she wished to remembered, she said: "“I’d like to be remembered as a good grandmother by some nice adults who are growing up and living happily in a peaceful world".

In 2021, she published a memoir titled Hovsångerska - eller vad ska jag göra med den där jävla folkskolelärarinnan? (Court singer - or what shall I do with that damn primary school teacher?), recalling a comment the director of the Royal Swedish Opera, Göran Gentele, was said to have made, shortly after she had joined the company.

Lindholm died in Sköndal, South Stockholm, on 12 August 2023, at age 88.

== Recordings ==
Lindholm made only a few recordings. She sang the role of Helmwige in Die Walküre in 1966, part of the Ring recording with the Wiener Philharmoniker conducted by Georg Solti.

In 1967, she recorded the final "Immolation" scene from Götterdämmerung conducted by Leopold Stokowski when she made her debut at the Royal Festival Hall. A reviewer from Gramophone noted: "They are joined by Berit Lindholm‚ making her Festival Hall début‚ in a noble account of Brünnhilde's Immolation scene‚ movingly richtoned‚ passionate‚ vocally secure and firm of line."

In 1969, she sang Cassandre in a recording of Les Troyens conducted by Colin Davis, although she had never performed the role on stage. She performed alongside Jon Vickers as Aeneas, with choir and orchestra of the Royal Opera House in London. Davis spent time with the cast to achieve authentic French singing, and they had to take extensive language coaching.

She also recorded Swedish songs, among others. Arias from her private collection were compiled in 2008, including Weber's "So bin ich nun verlassen" from Euryanthe, Beethoven's "Abscheulicher! Wo eilst du hin", Leonore's aria from Fidelio, Puccini's "In questa reggia" from Turandot, and music by Wagner, "Dich, teure Halle", Elisabeth's aria from Tannhäuser, "Einsam in trüben Tagen", Elsa's aria from Lohengrin, and excerpts from the three parts of the Ring.

== Awards ==
Lindholm was awarded the title Hovsångerska in 1976. She became a member of the Royal Swedish Academy of Music in Stockholm in 1984 and received the Litteris et Artibus award in 1988.
