= Svedmyra =

Coordinates: 59°16′27″N 18°04′24″E

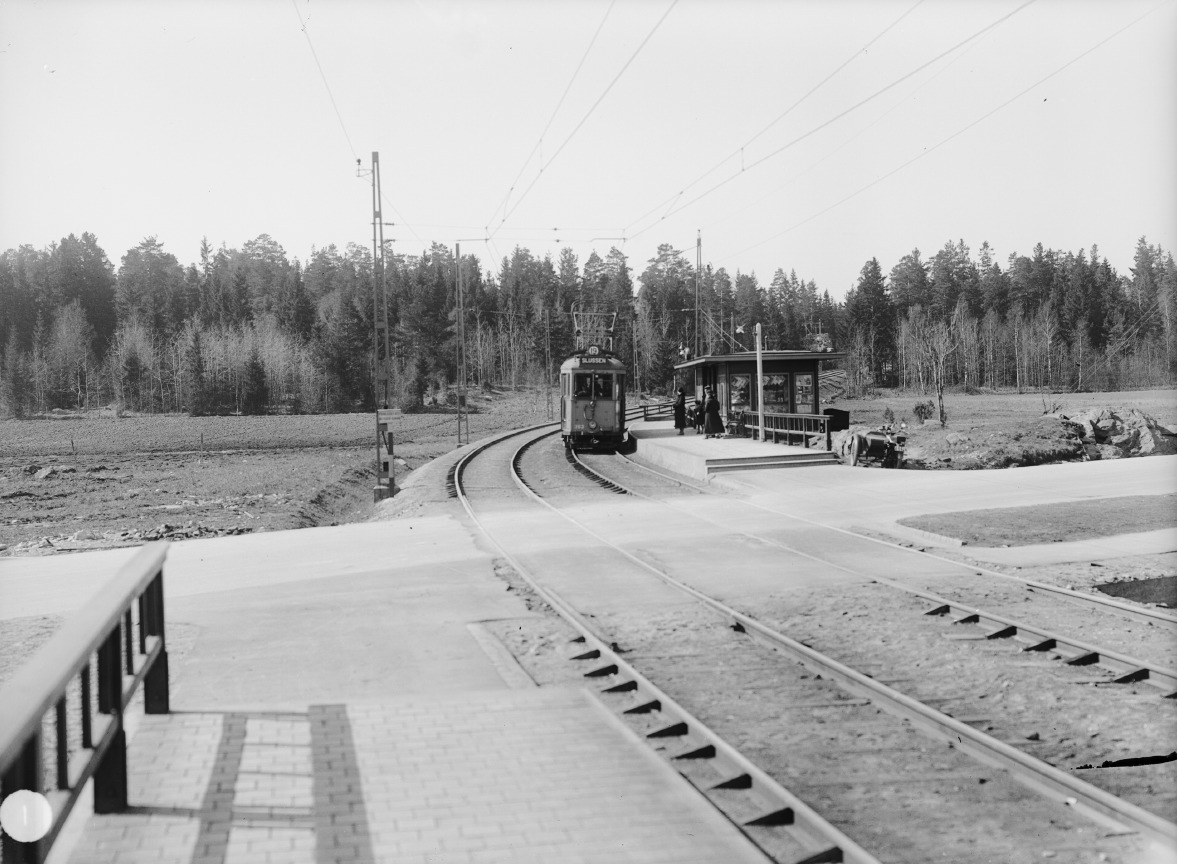
1931, a tram on the Örby track towards Slussen stops at Svedmyra. Tussmötevägen is in the foreground.

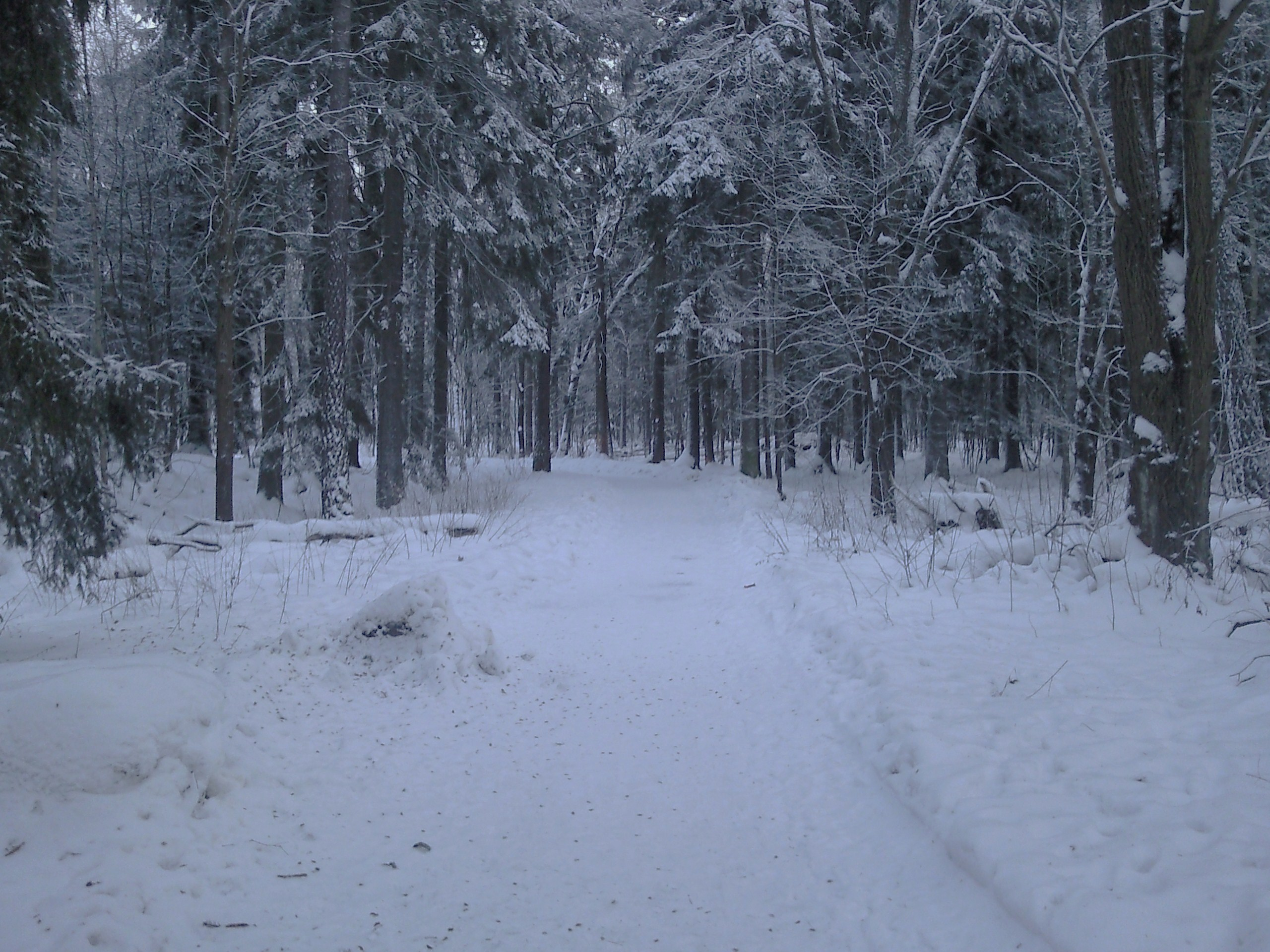
Edge of Majroskogen.

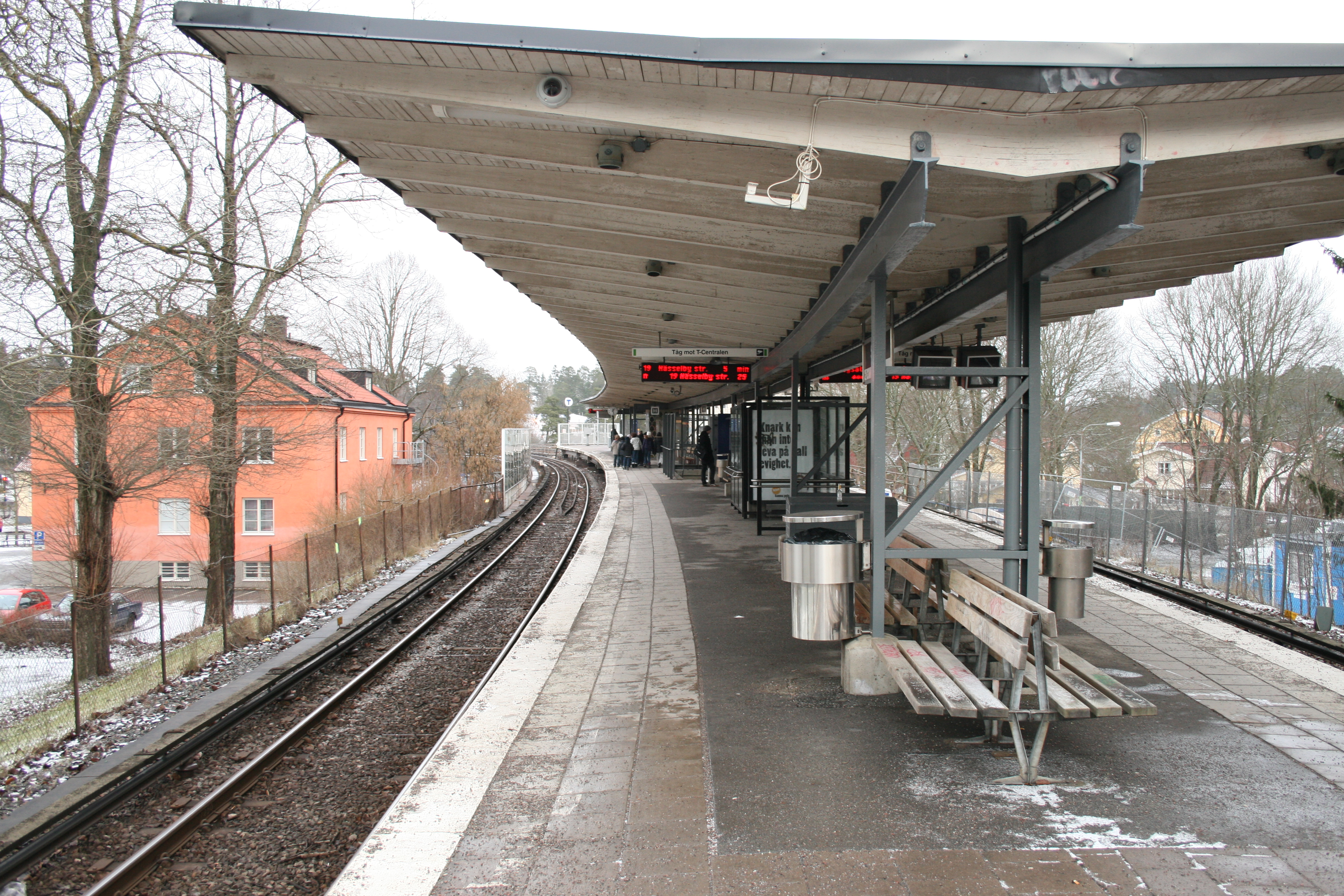
Svedmyra metro station, January 2009.

Svedmyra is a suburb in Söderort in the municipality of Stockholm, in the borough of Farsta. Svedmyra is located between Stureby and Tallkrogen, and covers about 0.92 km^{2} (0.36 sq mi) of land. Svedmyra is surrounded by forests and green space. The population in 2008 was 2,812. The name "Svedmyra" comes from a cottage that was formerly on the site, named Svinmyran, "Pig Bog". The cottage is known since the 14th century, and it belonged to Östberga farm. According to legend, Svedmyra was named after all the red forest ants in the forests around Svedmyra.

== Boundaries ==
Svedmyra borders Tallkrogen (in Svedmyra Forest and also in Torögatan and then in a line west of Herrhagsvägen), Gubbängen (at Tallkrogsvägen and further west in Majroskogen towards Örbyleden ), Stureby (north from Örbyleden to Grycksbo road and the metro and along the east side of the metro towards Svedmyraplan) and Gamla Enskede (along Svedmyraplan-Handelsvägen and Svedmyra Forest to a point south of Riskvägen).

== History ==
Until 1930, Svedmyra remained undeveloped except for a few old farms and cottages. Then streetcar line, Örbybanan, was opened between Slussen and Örby with a stop at Svedmyra (it was formally Stureby) and the area around the cottages began to be developed.

In 1932, the plan was expanded, and extended into both parks and sports grounds. A large number of houses were built in the 1930s and 1940s, and were built according to standard house plans, most signed by Swedish Architect Edwin Engström at the Stockholm municipal agency. Those who had little money on their own could borrow up to 90% of construction costs.

In the 1940s, demand for housing increased, and in 1944 three-storey slab blocks were planned. 1947–1948 saw new housing built, including at Frimärksvägen and Postiljonsvägen, most of them four-storey buildings. The houses were designed in HSB's architectural office of Curt Strehlenert, developer at AB Family Housing. The facades are covered by lime - or terrasitputs and ceilings are made of brick. One of the houses on Postiljonsvägen is occupied by a business.

The 1944 town plan was expanded, and the first half of the 1950s slab blocks were built, tower blocks and small houses in the woods east of Enskedevägen. Many houses were designed by Nils Lindberg and Bengt Karlsson.
