= Swedish national road 73 =

Road in Sweden

Coordinates: 59°05′47″N 18°06′26″E

National Road 73
- Riksväg 73
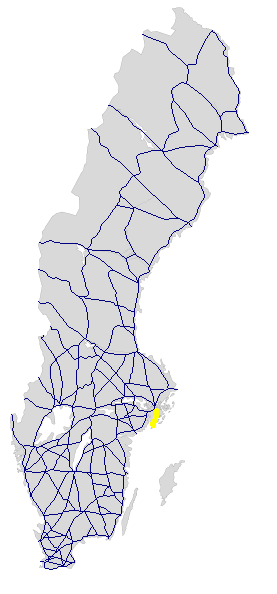

Location
- Country: Sweden

Highway system
- Roads in Sweden; National Roads; County Roads

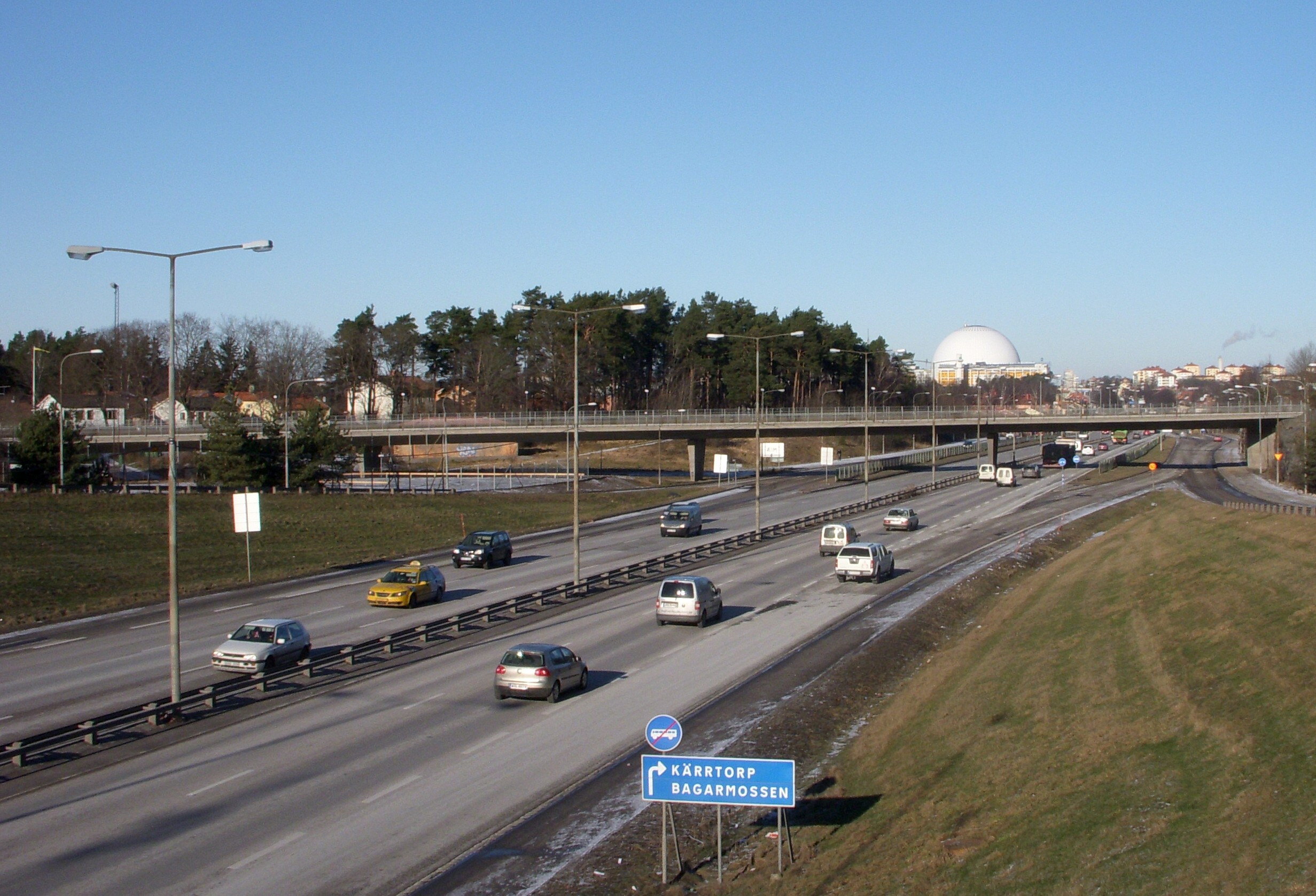
Nynäsvägen in Stockholm

National Road 73 (Riksväg 73), Nynäsvägen, is a Swedish national road in Sweden between Stockholm and Nynäshamn. The length is 57 km (35 mi).

National road 73 begins at the Johanneshov junction at Gullmarsplan in Stockholm with connections from the bridges Johanneshovsbron and Skanstullsbron and county road 226 (Huddingevägen), passing above Södra länken and continues southwards. At Gubbängen junction goes beneath county road 229 (Örbyleden/Tyresövägen), continues past Farsta, passing the municipal border of Huddinge where then county road 271 (Magelungsvägen) joins. Continues past Trångsund and Skogås. In Handen it goes above the end point of county road 260 (Gudöbroleden), continues past Jordbro, Västerhaninge, Landfjärden and Ösmo to Nynäshamn, where national road 73 comes to an end at the railway station and the Gotland quay.

The road is a motorway between Stockholm and Västerhaninge. The stretch between Västerhaninge (Fors junction) and Nynäshamn (Älgviken junction) has been built to a motorway as well. Construction began on September 1, 2005, and was finished in 2009.

The bridges for road 73 between Fors and Nynäshamn were designed by Erik Andersson (architect).
