= Vantör =

Borough of Stockholm, Sweden

Vantör (Swedish pronunciation: [ˈvânːtœːr]) was a borough (stadsdelsområde) in the southern part of Stockholm, Sweden, until 1 January 2007. The districts that made up the borough were Bandhagen, Hagsätra, Högdalen, Rågsved and Örby. The population as of 2004 was 35,155 over an area of 8.30 km², giving it a density of 4,236/km². In 2007, Vantör merged with the borough of Enskede-Årsta to form the Enskede-Årsta-Vantör borough.
