= Swedish county road 229 =

Road in Sweden

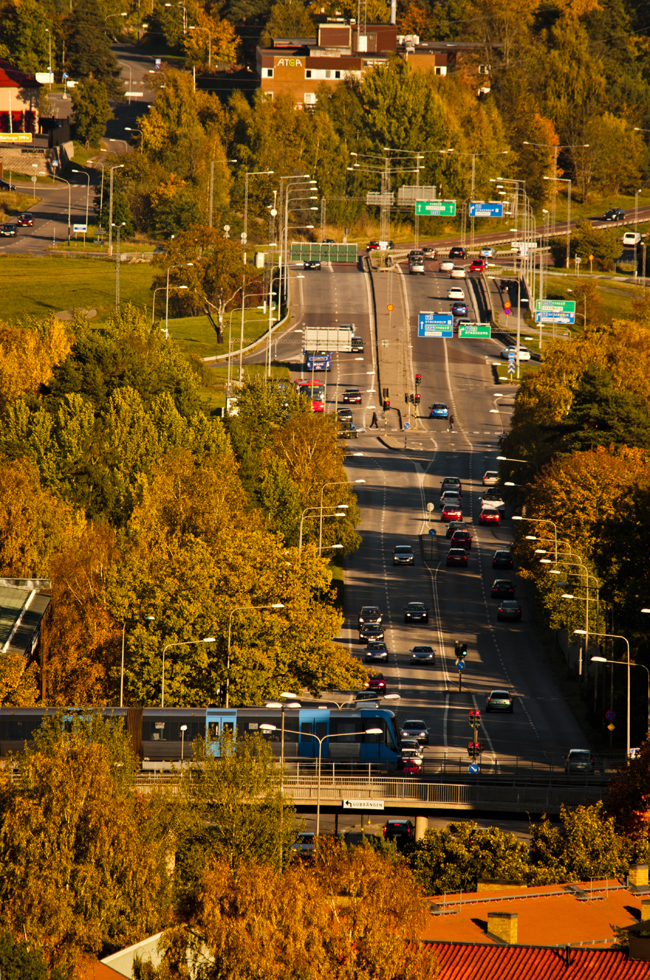
Örbyleden in Hökarängen, October 2011

Swedish county road 229 (Länsväg 229) is a primary county road in Sweden from the Örbyleden/Huddingevägen intersection in Stockholm to the Tyresövägen/Bollmoravägen intersection in Tyresö.

In the Stockholm end it begins, under the name Örbyleden, as a dual carriageway at a three-way junction with county road 226. It then continues towards the southeast to Gubbängen, where it crosses national road 73 in a cloverleaf interchange, changing its name to Tyresövägen. West of Skarpnäck junction the road turns into a motorway. At Älta junction the county road 260 has a short common segment until the Skrubba junction. The road continues then to the Bollmora junction, and both the motorway and county road 229 end shortly after at a roundabout.

For the regular road portion the speed limits found are 50 km/h (31 mph) and 70 km/h (43 mph), and for the whole motorway portion the speed limit is 90 km/h (56 mph). The road has separated road halves for almost the entire stretch, with an exception for a 0.7 km (0.43 mi) portion in Hökarängen.
