= Farsta (borough) =

- Borough of Stockholm
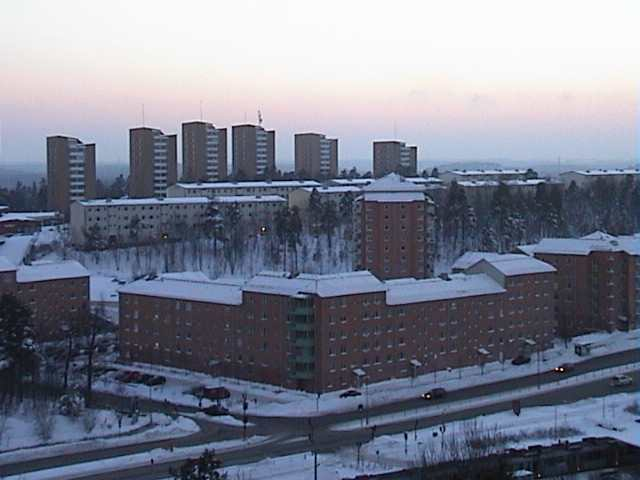
- Buildings in Farsta Strand

- Location of Farsta within Stockholm Municipality shown in yellow
- Coordinates: 59°14′25″N 18°05′50″E
- Country: Sweden
- Municipality: Stockholm Municipality
- Municipality subdivision: Söderort
- Established: 1997

Government
  - Type: Municipal assembly
  - Municipal commissioner: Birgitta Holm (M)
- Area: 15.40 km^{2} (5.95 sq mi)
- Population (2014): 55,300
  - Density: 3,590/km^{2} (9,300/sq mi)
- Time zone: UTC+1 (CET)
  - Summer (DST): UTC+2 (CEST)
- Postal code: 122 --, 123 --, 128 --
- Area code: 08
- Website: Stockholm.se

Farsta is a borough (stadsdelsområde) of Söderort in the southern part of Stockholm Municipality, Sweden.

== Overview ==
The districts that make up the borough are Fagersjö, Farsta, Farsta strand, Farstanäset, Gubbängen, Hökarängen, Larsboda, Sköndal, Svedmyra and Tallkrogen. The population as of 2004 is 45,463 on an area of 15.40 km^{2}, which gives a density of 2,952.14/km^{2}.
