= Vantor =

Vantor may refer to:

- Vantör, a borough of Stockholm
- Vantor (company), a US-based company
