= Älvsjö (borough) =

- Borough of Stockholm
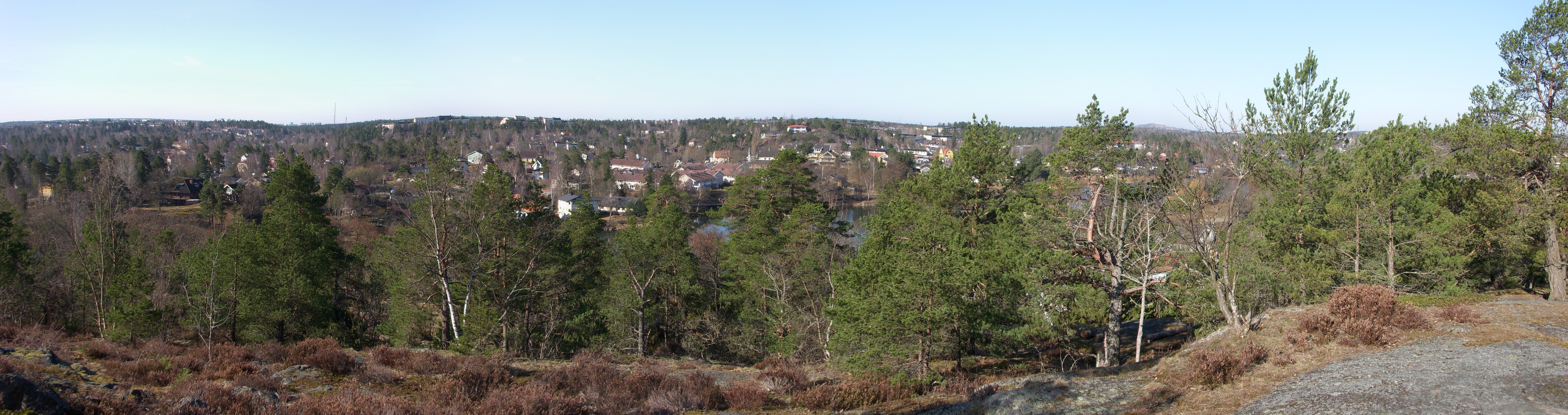
- View of Långsjö

- Location within Stockholm
- Coordinates: 59°16′40″N 18°00′32″E
- Country: Sweden
- Municipality: Stockholm
- Municipal part: Söderort
- Established: 1997

Area
  - Total: 9.11 km^{2} (3.52 sq mi)

Population (2014)
  - Total: 27,500
  - Density: 3,020/km^{2} (7,820/sq mi)
- Website: Älvsjö at stockholm.se

Älvsjö (Swedish pronunciation: [ɛlvɧø]) was a borough (stadsdelsområde) in the southern part of Stockholm Sweden. The borough is divided into the districts Herrängen, Långsjö, Långbro, Älvsjö, Solberga, Örby Slott and Liseberg. It has about 21,000 inhabitants.
