= Enskede-Årsta-Vantör =

Borough of Stockholm

- Borough of Stockholm
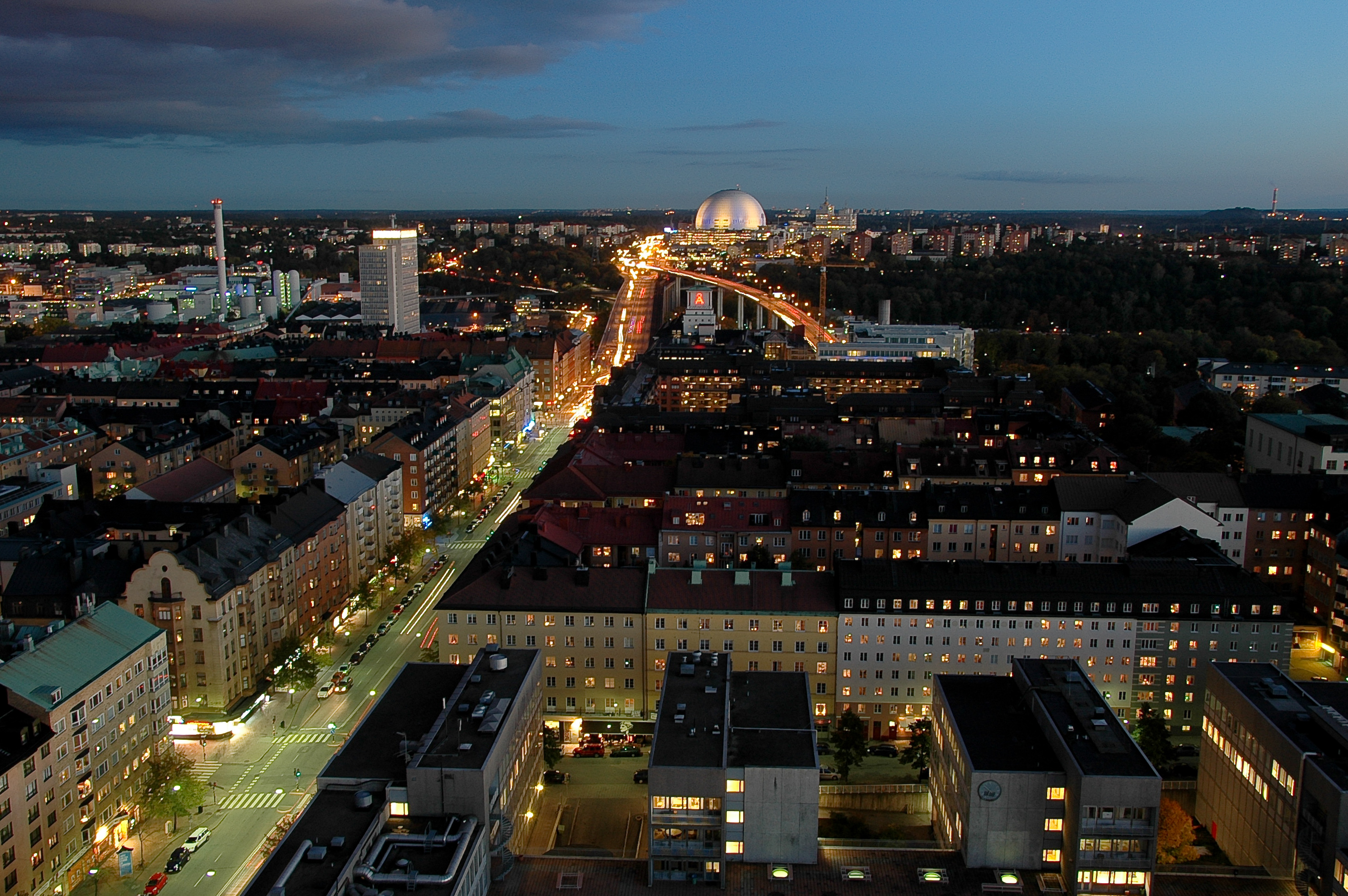
- View of southern Södermalm, with Ericsson Globe (located in the borough of Enskede-Årsta-Vantör) in the background.

- Location of Enskede-Årsta-Vantör shown in yellow
- Coordinates: 59°16′55″N 18°05′15″E
- Country: Sweden
- Municipality: Stockholm Municipality
- Municipality subdivision: Söderort
- Established: 2007

Population (2025)
  - Total: 105,899
- Time zone: UTC+1 (CET)
  - Summer (DST): UTC+2 (CEST)
- Website: Enskede-Årsta-Vantör on Stockholm site

Enskede-Årsta-Vantör (listen one by one) is a borough (stadsdelsområde) in Söderort, the southern part of Stockholm, Sweden.

== Overview ==
The districts that make up the borough are Enskedefältet, Enskede Gård, Gamla Enskede, Johanneshov, Stureby, Årsta, Östberga, Bandhagen, Högdalen, Örby, Rågsved and Hagsätra. The population as of 2025 was 105,899.

The borough was formed in January 2007 from two older boroughs, Enskede-Årsta and Vantör.

== Notable people ==
- Zara Larsson, musician
- Janet Leon, former member of Play
- Janice Kavander, musician
- Sanna Nielsen, musician
- Johanna and Klara Söderberg, musicians
- Anders Ygeman, politician

== Notable places ==
- Gubbängens IP, sports ground and former speedway venue
