= Rågsveds IF =

Swedish football club

- Full name: Rågsveds Idrottsförening
- Nickname: RIF
- Founded: 1958
- Ground: Hagsätra Idrottsplats; Bandhagen; Sweden
- Capacity: 2000
- Chairman: Glenn Blomberg
- Head coach: Thomas Ghebremedhin
- League: Division 2 Södra Svealand
- 2021: Division 3 Södra Svealand, 1st
Home colours

Rågsveds IF is a Swedish football club located in Hagsätra.

== Background ==
Rågsveds IF will start 2015 playing in Division 4 Stockholm Södra which is the sixth tier of Swedish football. Woman squad will start playing in Division 3 which is fifth tier in Swedish football. Rågsveds IF play their home matches at the Hagsätra IP in Hagsätra.

The club is affiliated to Stockholms Fotbollförbund.

== Season to season ==
Season	Level	Division	Section	Position	Movements
2006*	Tier 7	Division 5	Stockholm Södra	1st	Promoted
2007	Tier 6	Division 4	Stockholm Södra	6th	
2008	Tier 6	Division 4	Stockholm Södra	1st	Promoted
2009	Tier 5	Division 3	Södra Svealand	10th	Relegated
2010	Tier 6	Division 4	Stockholm Södra	9th	
2011	Tier 6	Division 4	Stockholm Södra		
2012	Tier 6	Division 4	Stockholm Södra	12th	Relegated
2013	Tier 7	Division 5	Stockholm Södra	9th	
2014	Tier 7	Division 5	Stockholm Södra	1st	Promoted
2015	Tier 6	Division 4	Stockholm Södra	7th	
2016	Tier 6	Division 4	Stockholm Södra	10th	
2017	Tier 6	Division 4	Stockholm Södra	8th	
2018	Tier 6	Division 4	Stockholm Södra	7th	
2019	Tier 6	Division 4	Stockholm Mellersta	1st	Promoted
2020	Tier 5	Division 3	Södra Svealand	5th	
2021	Tier 5	Division 3	Södra Svealand	1st	Promoted

* League restructuring in 2006 resulted in a new division being created at Tier 3 and subsequent divisions dropping a level.
