= Gubbängens IP =

Former motorcycle speedway venue in Stockholm, Sweden

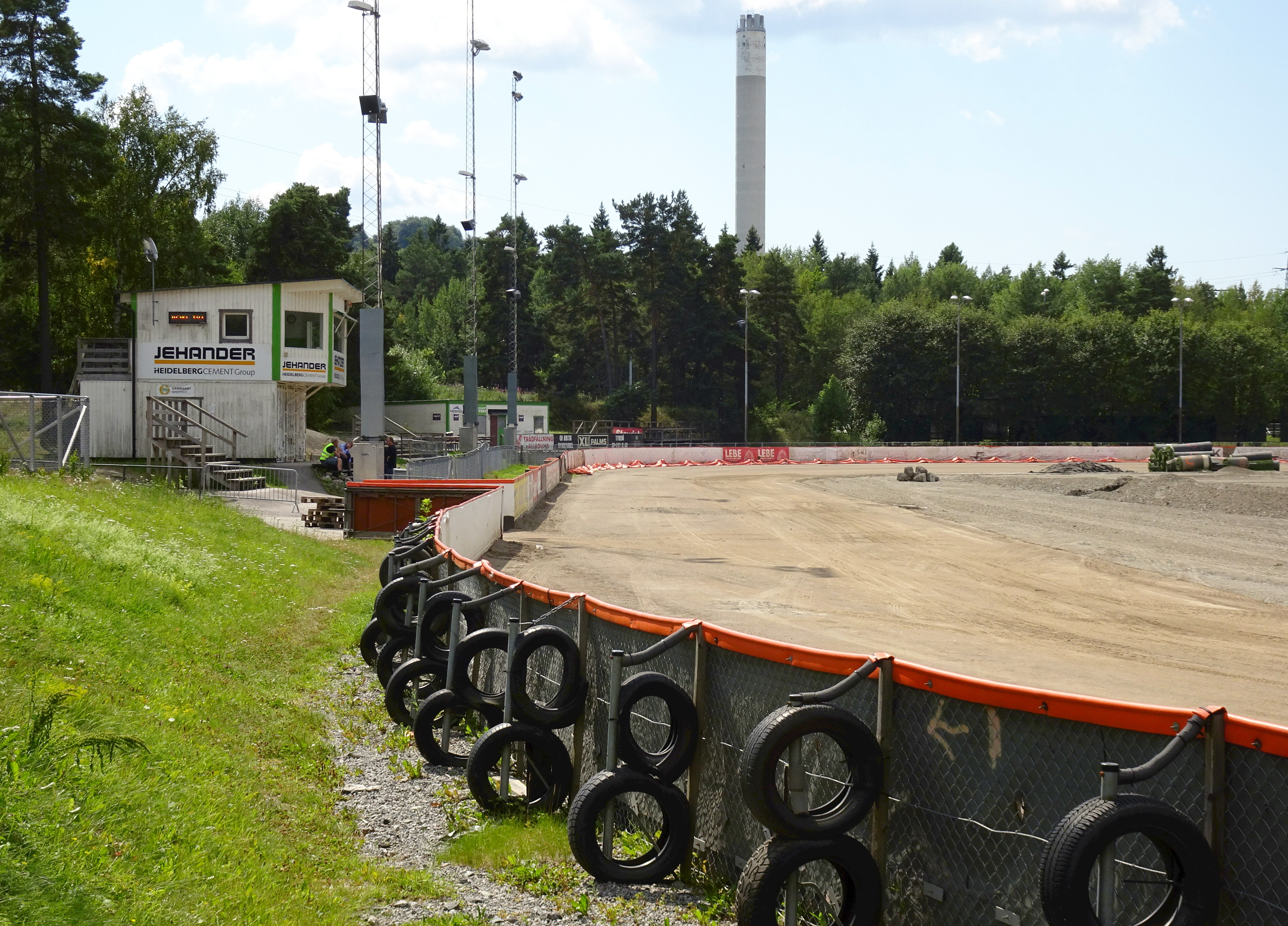
- The speedway track in 2016 in the process of being replaced
- Location: Målkurvan 24, 122 45 Enskede, Sweden
- Coordinates: 59°15′44″N 18°04′04″E
- Opened: 1950s
- Closed: 2016

Gubbängens IP or Gubbängens Idrottsplats (Sports Ground) is a former motorcycle speedway track, located in Enskede in the southern part of Stockholm, Sweden. From the 1950s to 2010, it hosted Getingarna, the most successful club in Swedish speedway history with 14 Championships. It was also the venue for major speedway events, including the final of the World Pairs Championship.

== History ==
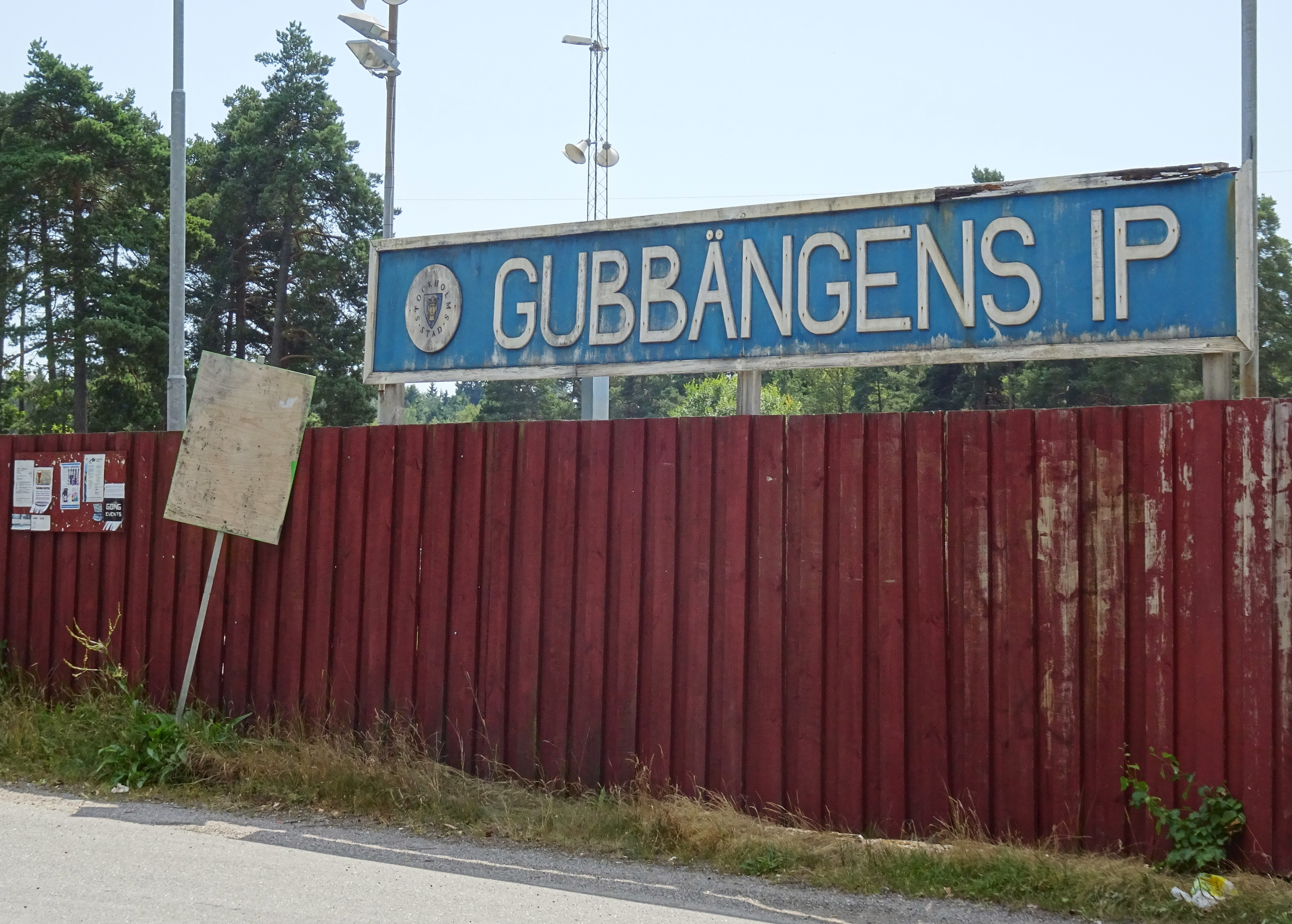

In the late 1950s, the town plan was approved for the current Gubbängens IP (a previous field built in the 1940s by the same name still exists) which was built on the western part of Gubbängsfältet. In addition to a sports field for 1,500 spectators, plans were made for various training fields as well as practice areas for high jump and shot put.

When the speedway team Getingarna left the Stockholm Olympic Stadium they later found a home at Gubbängens IP, where they won many of their record 14 Swedish Speedway Team Championships.

In 1969, the track hosted the 1969 Speedway World Pairs Championship.

From 2004 to 2010 the track was groundshared by Hammarby Speedway (a reincarnation of Monarkerna), who raced at Hammarby IP. From 2011, they were the sole users of the track after Getingarna closed in 2010.

The speedway track's demise was effectively sealed in 2015, after plans to build a new bandy hall were moved from Tallkrogen to Gubbängen. The plans included parts of the speedway track needing to be asphalted.

In 2016, the track was demolished and in addition to the bandy hall, an artificial pitch was constructed to replace the remaining larger section of the speedway track. Today it is a football pitch in summer and converted into a bandy pitch in winter.
