= Skogås =

District of Huddinge municipality, Sweden

Coordinates: 59°13′4.62″N 18°9′15.95″E

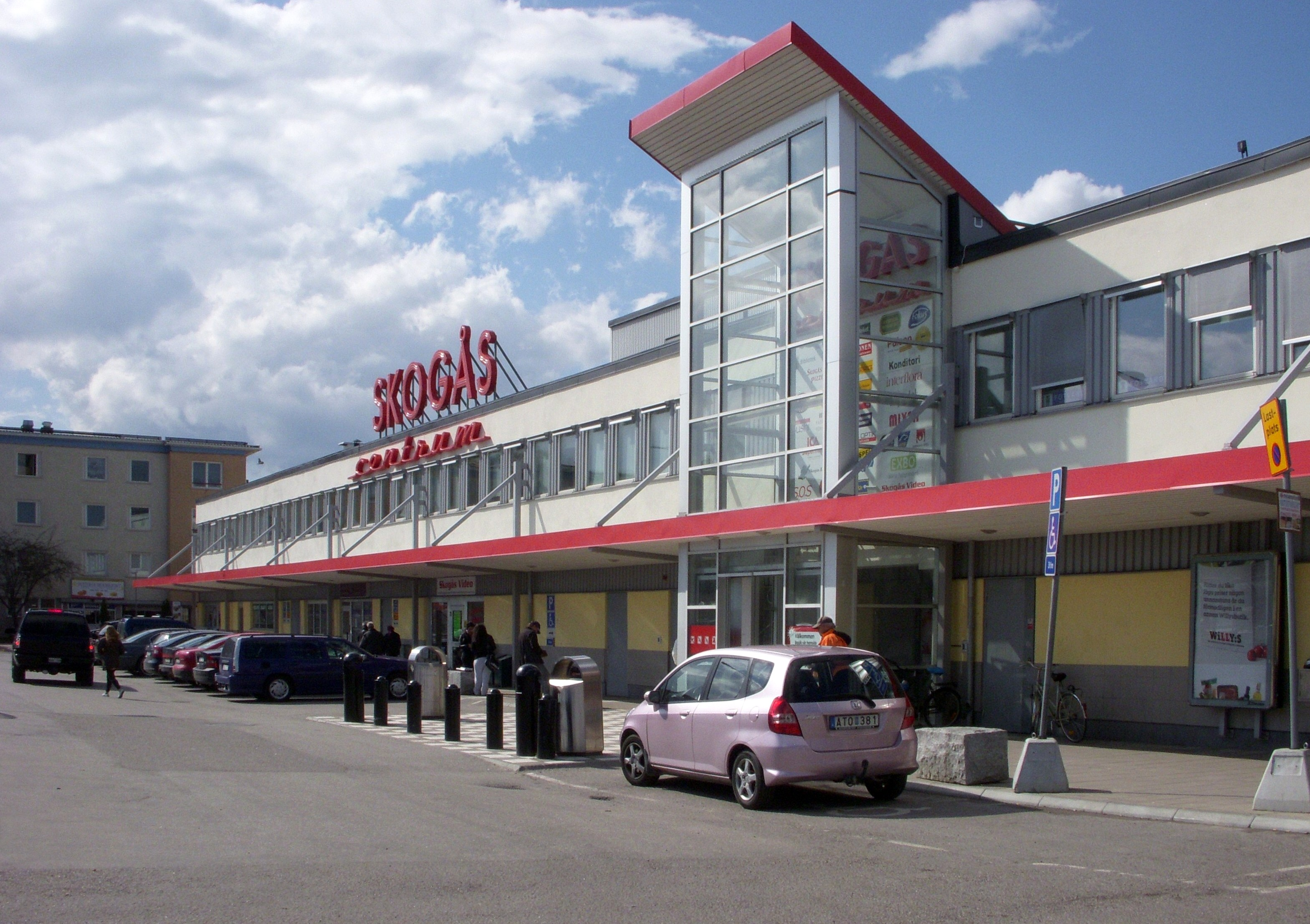
Skogås centrum

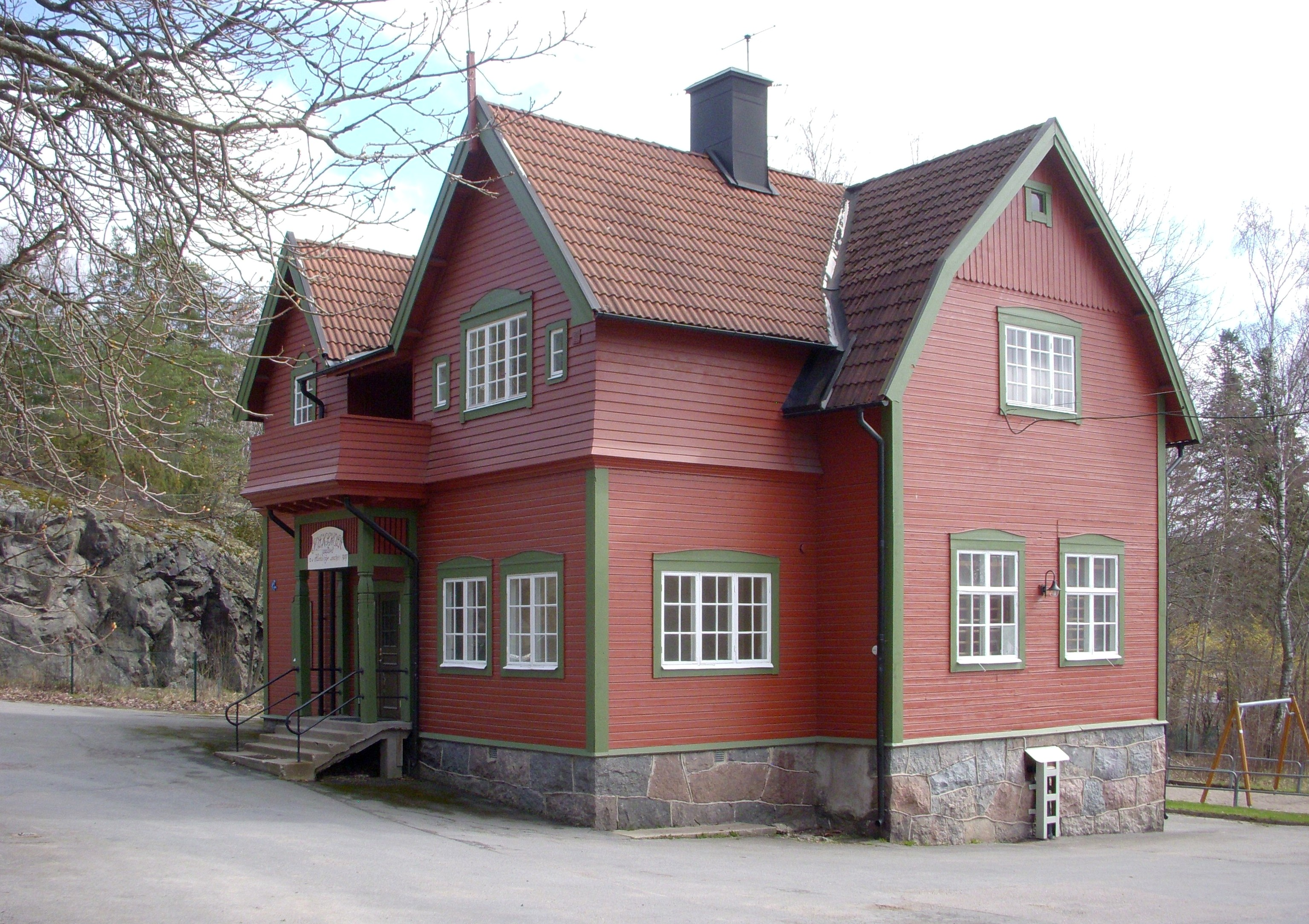
Beateberg old school from 1909

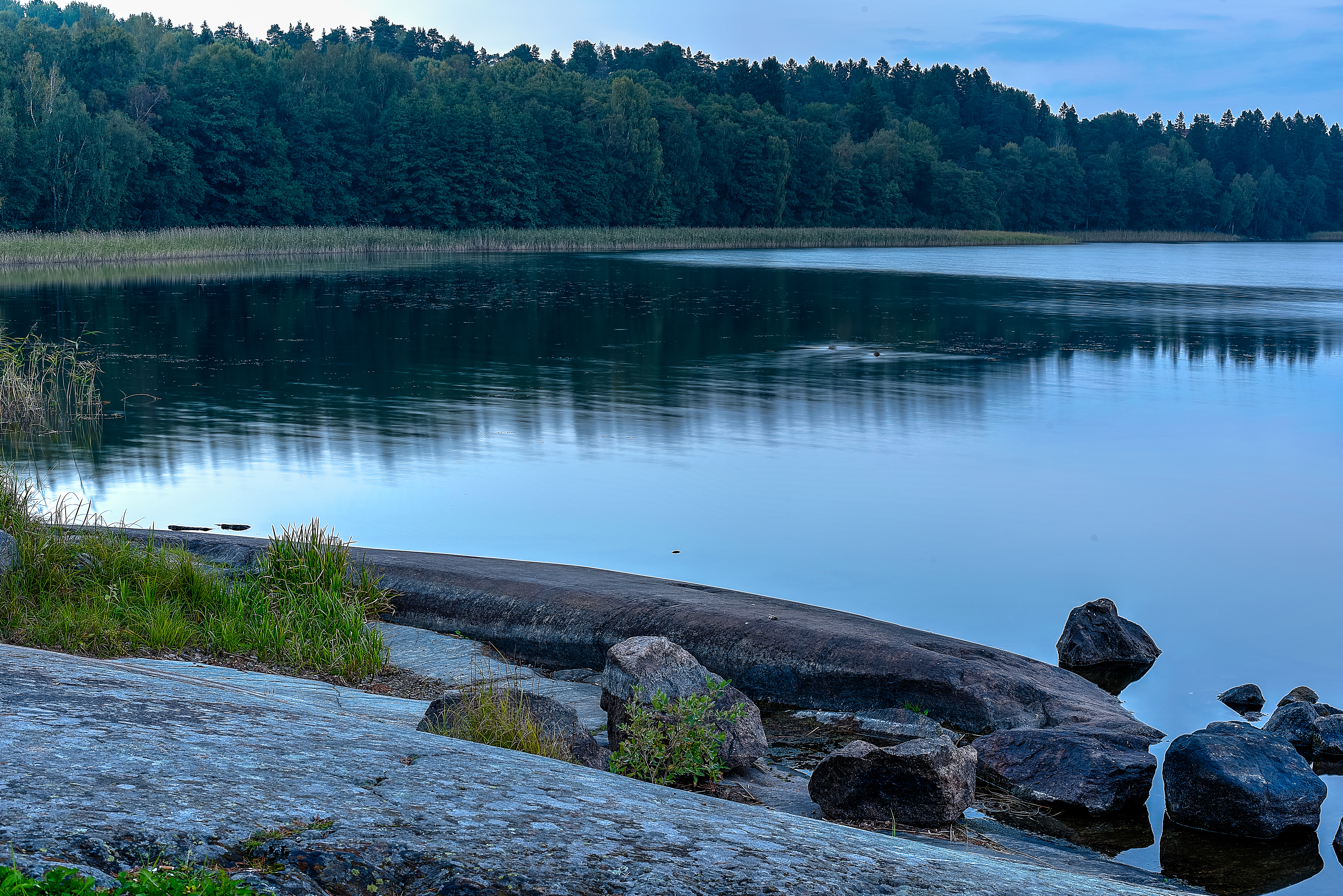
Drevviken at Skogås badudde

Skogås is a district of Huddinge Municipality in Stockholm County, Sweden, 15 kilometres (9 mi) south of Stockholm along the railroad to the city and harbour of Nynäshamn. In 2016, Skogås had 14,451 inhabitants. The suburb has conjoined with its northern neighbour Trångsund, forming a municipality district with a population of 22,200 people. The largest employer is the commercial centre in Länna.

Sights include the Ågesta Nature Reserve, the lakes Drevviken, Magelungen and Orlången, the congregations church Mariakyrkan, Trångsund Manor and the upper secondary school Östra Gymnasiet. Beatebergsanstalten, a jail for minor offenders, is located in the northwest of Skogås.

Skogås is served by Line 43 of the Stockholm commuter rail, and is 20 minutes from Stockholm City railway station. Swedish national road 73 passes Skogås on its way to Nynäshamn.

The name Skogås comes from the two words skog 'forest' and ås 'ridge'; hence "the forest-covered ridge", reflecting Skogås's topography of hills, ridges and valleys.

== History ==
Skogås started its history as a cottage summer retreat outside the capital but was given town-like structures during the 1960s, when the town-centre containing some 30 shops was finished. During the 1980s a large settlement of rowhouses (the largest in the country) was added in the eastern part of the suburb and since then, several areas of villas and one-family houses have increased the population greatly.

Since 1997, there has been an urge in Skogås and Trångsund to leave Huddinge Municipality, and form an own municipality. The major idea for the name of such a new municipality would be Drevviken, named after the adjacent lake. A local political party, Drevvikenpartiet, was formed before the 1998 elections, and a referendum was held in all of the municipality, with a majority for leaving in the Skogås-Trångsund area, and a majority for them staying in the rest of Huddinge.

After the 2006 elections, neither the socialist or non-socialist parties gained a majority in Huddinge municipality, and Drevvikenpartiet joined a coalition with the non-socialist parties in exchange for the promise of a new referendum on April 20, 2008. This referendum was to be held in Skogås and Trångsund only, but this time the no-side won quite clearly, 58.8% no and 40.1% yes.
