= Gudrun Dahl =

Swedish social anthropologist

Professor emerita Gudrun Dahl
- Born: 3 April 1948 (age 78); Enskede, Sweden
- Known for: Having Herds: Pastoral Herd Growth and Household Economy
- Parent: Sven Dahl

Academic work
- Discipline: Anthropologist
- Institutions: Stockholm University

Gudrun Dahl (born 3 April 1948 in Enskede, Sweden) is a Swedish social anthropologist. She grew up in Stockholm and Gothenburg. Since 1989 she has been a professor at Stockholm University, and is currently a professor emerita. Her current research interests lie in "[m]oral arguments in environmental work." In the Fall of 1992, Dahl was a Fellow at the Swedish Collegium for Advanced Study in Uppsala, Sweden.

Professor Dahl has published several books, including Having Herds: Pastoral Herd Growth and Household Economy and Suffering Grass: Subsistence and Society of Waso Borana.

She is the daughter of the Swedish geographer Sven Dahl (1912–1979), who himself was the son of the Swedish professor Carl G. Dahl, a pomologist, and Sven's wife, the genealogist Olga Dahl. Her brother, Östen, is also a professor emeritus at Stockholm University, where he teaches linguistics.
