= Enskede-Årsta =

Borough of Stockholm, Sweden

- 1999–2007
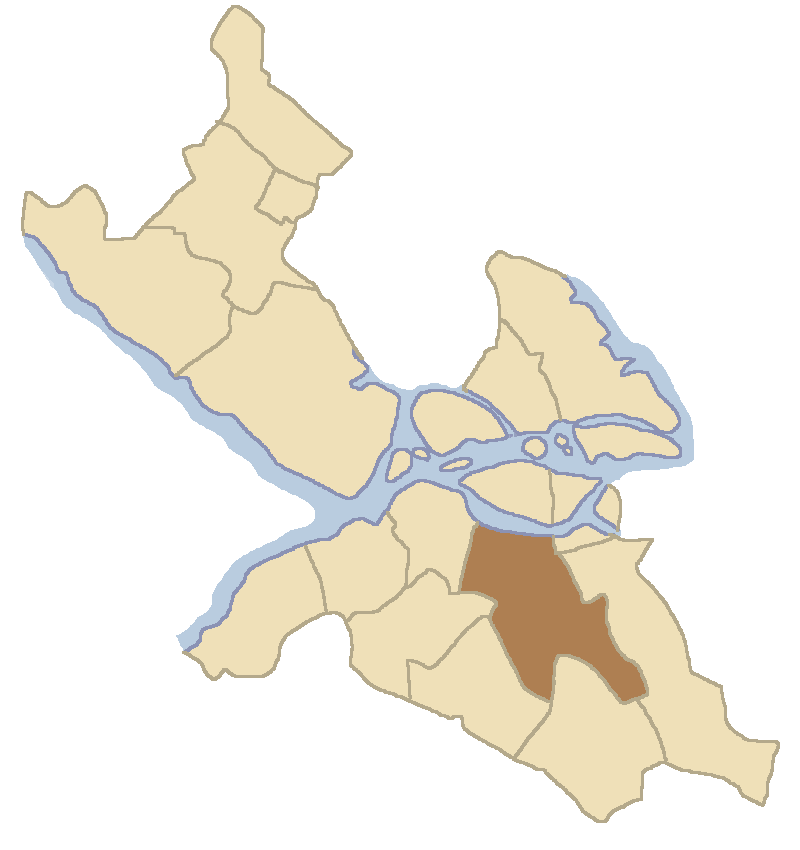
- Location of Enskede-Årsta
- History
  - Established: 1999
  - Disestablished: 2007
- Political subdivisions: Enskedefältet, Enskede gård, Gamla Enskede, Johanneshov, Stureby, Årsta, Östberga
Preceded by	Succeeded by
[[Årsta & Enskede]]	Enskede-Årsta-Vantör
- Today part of: Sweden

Enskede-Årsta was a borough (stadsdelsområde) in the southern part of Stockholm, Sweden from 1998 to 1 January 2007. It was formed when the boroughs of Enskede and Årsta merged, and was primarily made up of Enskede (Gård, -fältet, Gamla-) and Årsta. The other districts that made up the borough were Johanneshov, Stureby and Östberga. The population as of 2004 was 46,072 on an area of 12.72 km^{2}, giving it a density of 3,622/km^{2}. In 2007, Enskede-Årsta merged with the borough of Vantör to form the Enskede-Årsta-Vantör borough.

== Notable people ==
- Gudrun Dahl (born 1948), social anthropologist and university professor emerata
- Felix Pangilinan-Lemetti (born 1999), basketball player
