= Hökarängen =

Suburban district in Stockholm, Sweden

Coordinates: 59°15′28″N 18°04′57″E

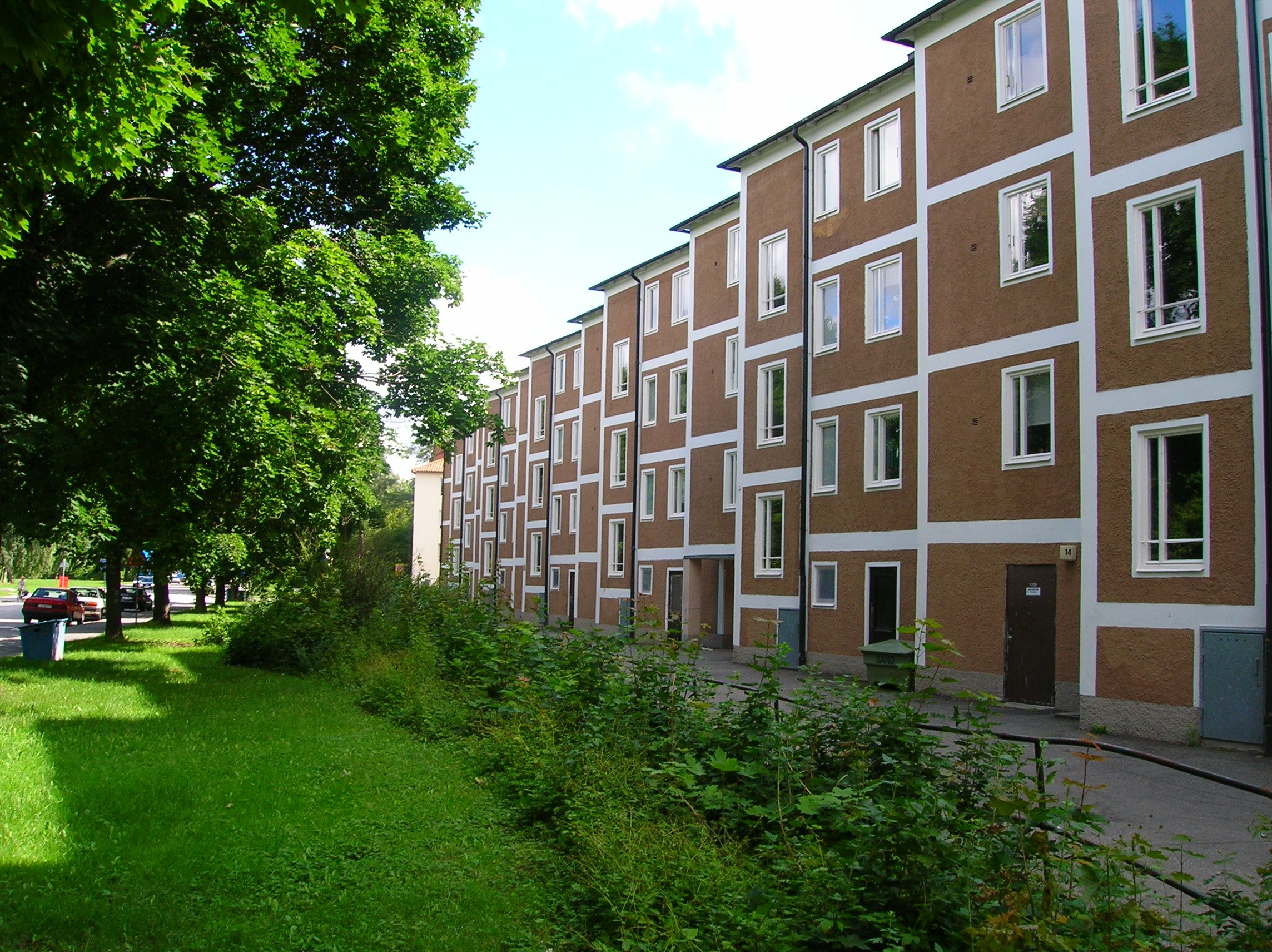
Hökarängen in August 2005.

Hökarängen is a district in the Farsta borough of southern Stockholm. It neighbours Fagersjö to the west, Farsta to the south, Sköndal to the east and Gubbängen to the north. As of 2017, the total population of Hökarängen is 9,564

The district was one of the first examples of the many new suburbs built along the new subway in the decades after World War II. The Hökarängen metro station is located in the district. It was opened on October 1, 1950, as part of the first route of the Stockholm Metro, running from Slussen to Hökarängen. The station is on the Green Line (T18) and has two exits, one in the central part of Hökarängen (by Örbyleden), and the other in the southern part of the district, near Sirapsvägen.
