= Solberga, Stockholm =

Urban district in Stockholm, Sweden

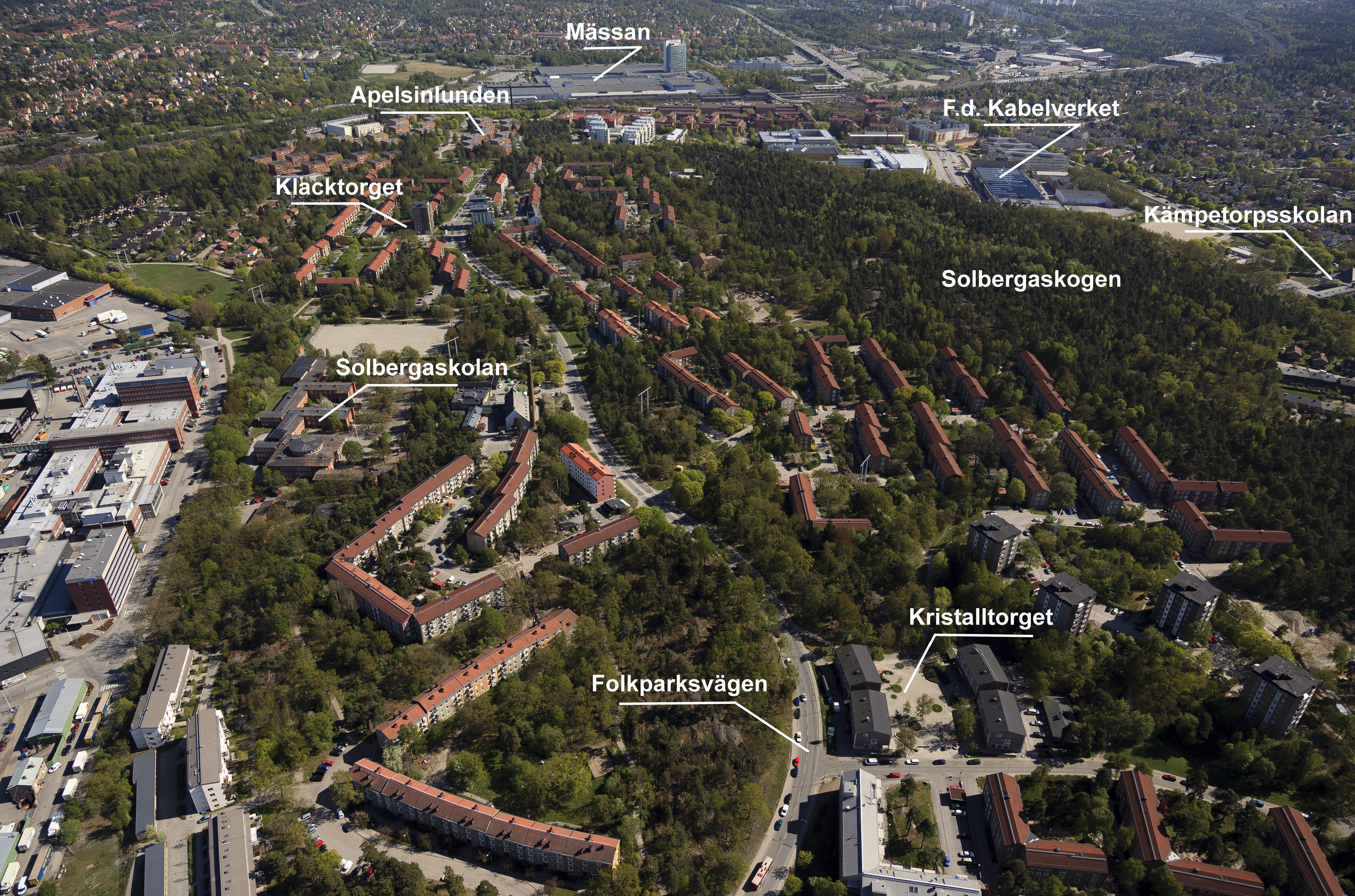
Solberga from above 2011 (view from north)

Solberga is a district in Söderort within Stockholm municipality and a part of Hägersten-Älvsjö borough. The district's main residential buildings are an example of the understated suburban architecture of the Swedish welfare state, developed in the 1950s and designed by renowned architects.

The name is given from a mountain in the woods, where the steep southern side of the mountain is missing trees. It gave name to the clergy house nearby in the 17th century, part of Brännkyrka socken.

LM Ericsson's cable plant was built in the area in 1916, as a complement to the plant in Telefonplan. In 2016 the houses were transformed into a residential area.

In the 1950s, villas were built, and the district was expanded with multifamily residentials as a part of Million Programme in 1960s. More houses were built in the 1980s close to Älvsjö train station.

Today, the area has three squares: Kristalltorget, Klacktorget, and Älvsjö stationsplan

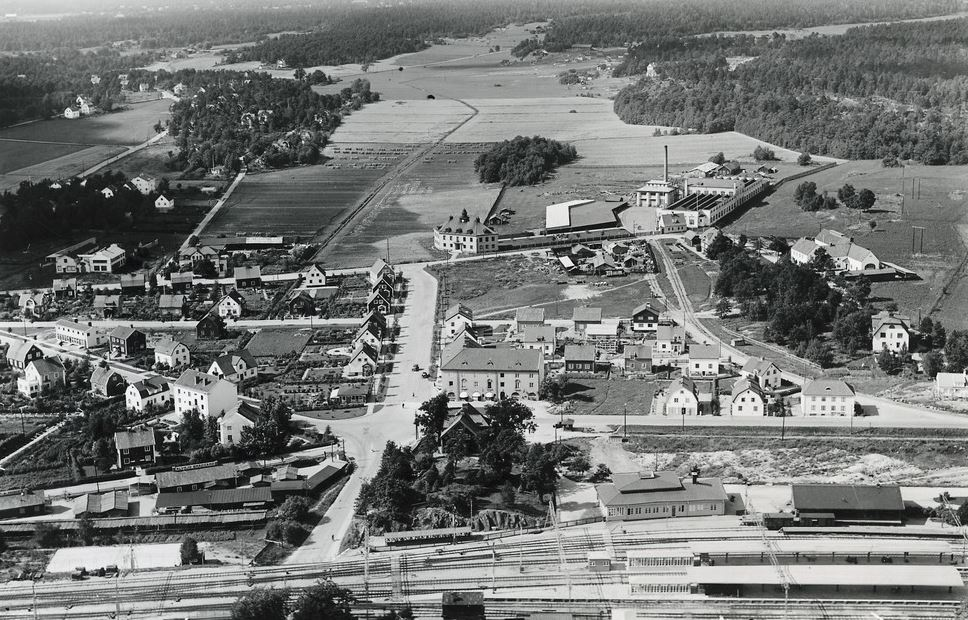
Solberga in 1930s, with Älvsjövägen vertically situated in the middle.
