= Sköndal =

Urban district in Stockholm, Sweden

Coordinates: 59°15′18″N 18°6′59″E

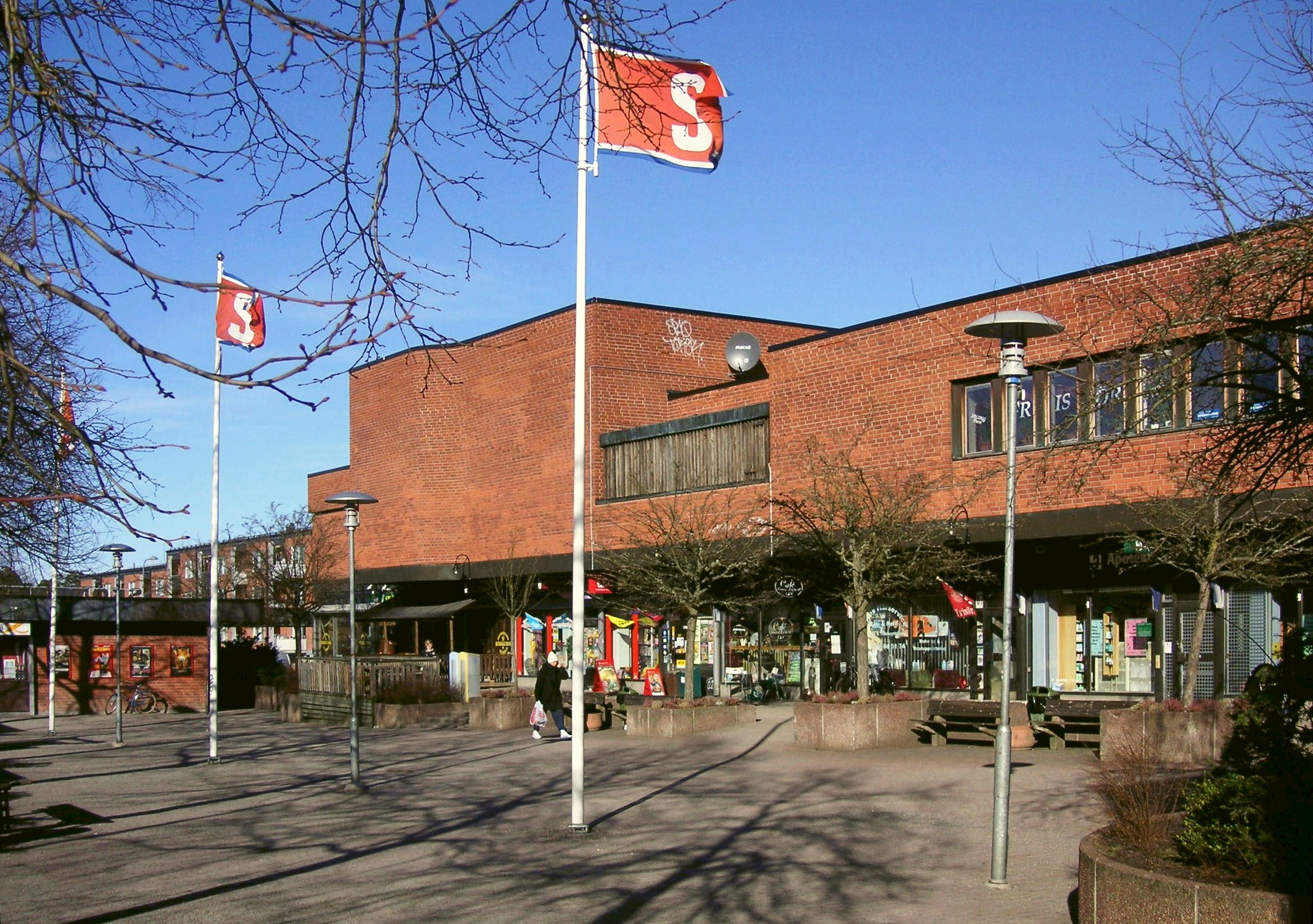
Sköndal

Sköndal is a district in the Farsta borough of southern Stockholm. It neighbours Gubbängen to the northwest, Hökarängen to the west, Farsta to the southwest and Larsboda to the south. To the east and partially north it neighbours the Skarpnäck borough, in particular the districts of Skarpnäcks Gård and Orhem. As of December 31, 2008, the total population of Sköndal is 7,450.

The area was largely developed in the 1950s and 1960, with the building of a number of apartment blocks. In 1969 the shopping centre Sköndals Centrum was built, consisting of small number of shops around an open square. The local library is found here, along with a small supermarket, a newsagents and a bar.

Sköndal is well served by Stockholm's public transport system, with buses running from Sköndals Centrum to Farsta, and from the nearby motorway, Tyresövägen, to Gullmarsplan.

The area is largely residential, though broken up by green spaces, wooded areas and footpaths and cycleways. Close by is the lake Drevviken, with a walking trail around the edge, and the Flaten conservation area.
