= Hagsätra =

- quarter
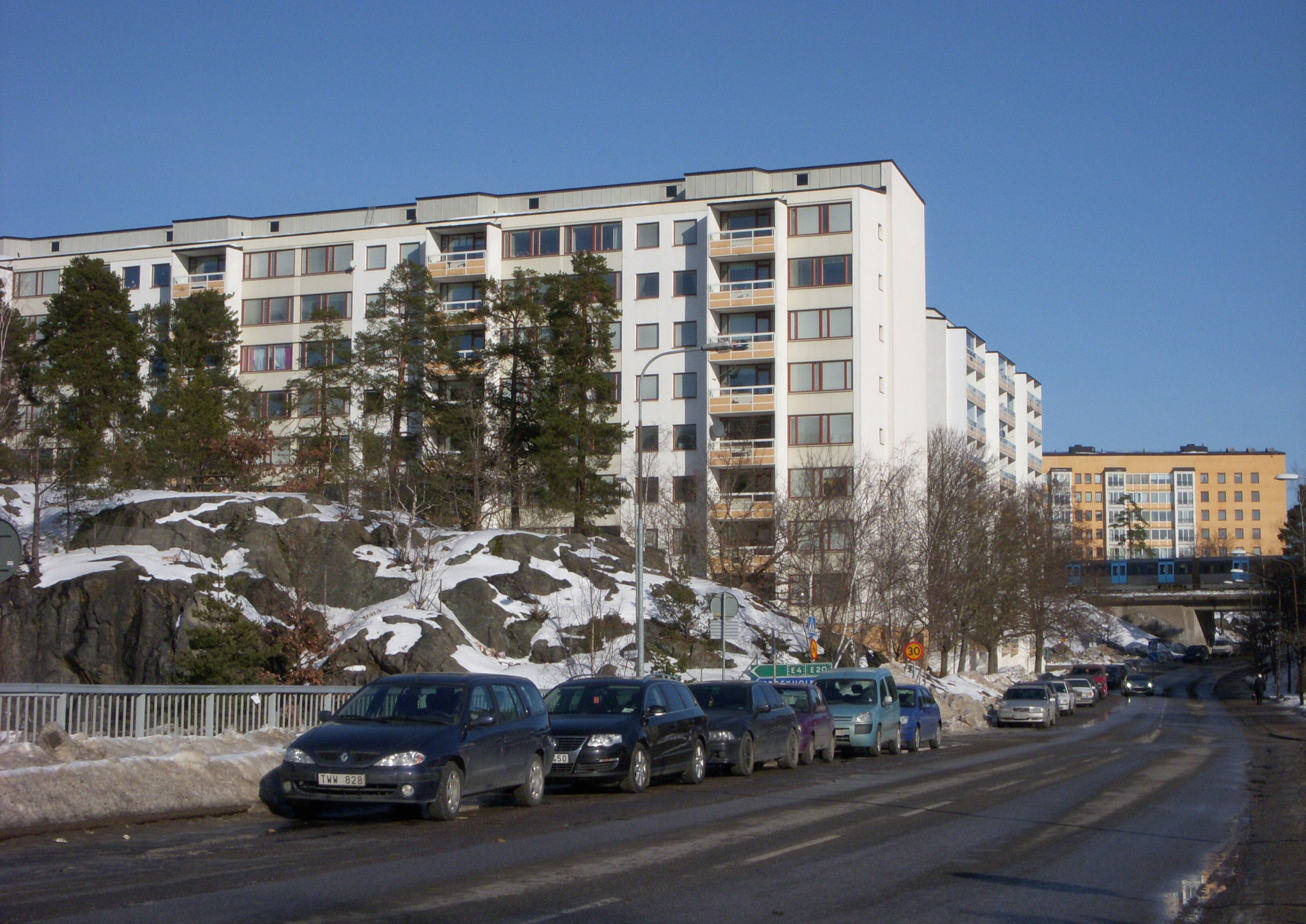

- Location within Stockholm Municipality Location within Sweden
- Coordinates: 59°15′46″N 18°00′45″E
- Country: Sweden
- Province: Södermanland
- County: Stockholm County
- Municipality: Stockholm Municipality
- Municipality subdivision: Söderort
- Borough: Enskede-Årsta-Vantör
- Website: http://www.stockholm.se/

Hagsätra is a district (stadsdel) in Söderort, the southern part of Stockholm Municipality, Sweden. It is part of the Enskede-Årsta-Vantör borough (stadsdelsområde) . It borders with the districts of Älvsjö, Örby and Rågsved in Stockholm, as well as Stuvsta in neighboring Huddinge Municipality. Hagsätra covers an area of 420 acres (170 ha) and, as of December 2023, has a population of 9934.

This area previously belonged to Älvsjö gård manor but was incorporated into Stockholm in 1930. But it wasn't until 1957 Hagsätra started expanding with modern houses and architecture. Hagsätra has a marketplace known as Hagsätra torg. The Hagsätra metro station is the southern terminus on Line 19 of Stockholm's Metro system.
