= Rågsved =

Urban district in southern Stockholm, Sweden

Coordinates: 59°15′22.52″N 18°1′53.38″E

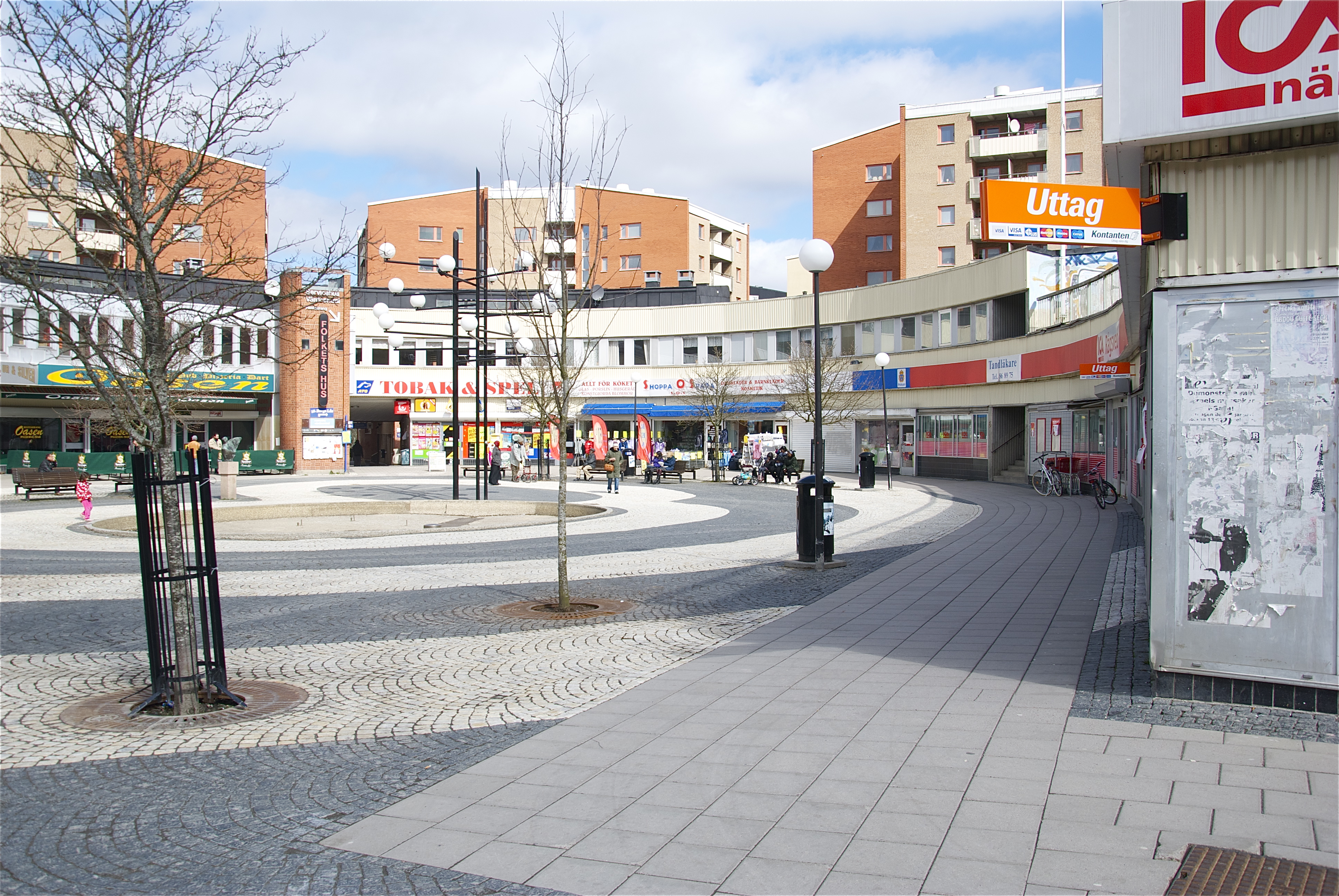
Rågsved centre

Rågsved is a suburb historically belonging to the district of Bandhagen in Stockholm, Sweden.

== History ==
Rågsved remained uninhabited until the mid-1950s. In 1953 a development plan was set up for the area. Rågsveds centrum and Rågsved metro station on the Stockholm Metro were built in 1955–1957. The first areas built were the neighborhoods of Snösätrahöjden and Bjursätrahöjden. The neighbouring community of Hagsätra was formed in 1959. In the early years, Rågsved was mostly inhabited by expatriate workers from the inner city, particularly from Södermalm, and was considered state of the art in the late 1950s. The neighbourhood was early on neglected and by the late 1960's were known for widespread drug use.

While Rågsved was built, an industrialization type of style dominated the construction, and this is visible at the houses located to the north of the subway. There, modernism made its mark, with more towers and slab blocks. Rågsved centrum contains a horseshoe-shaped multi-building which holds different kinds of services and was designed by architects Kell Åström (1920-2004) and Lars Bryde (1918-2002).

In the mid-1980s Rågsveds buildings were expanded with Snösätraområdet, where red brick houses with enclosed courtyards were built, much like in Skarpnäcks gård.

== Demographics ==
As of 2023 Rågsved had a population of 11,624 of which 71,6% are immigrants or born to two immigrant parents. This percentage has increased since 1997, where it was 39.6%, and in 2008, 62.8%.

== Picture gallery ==
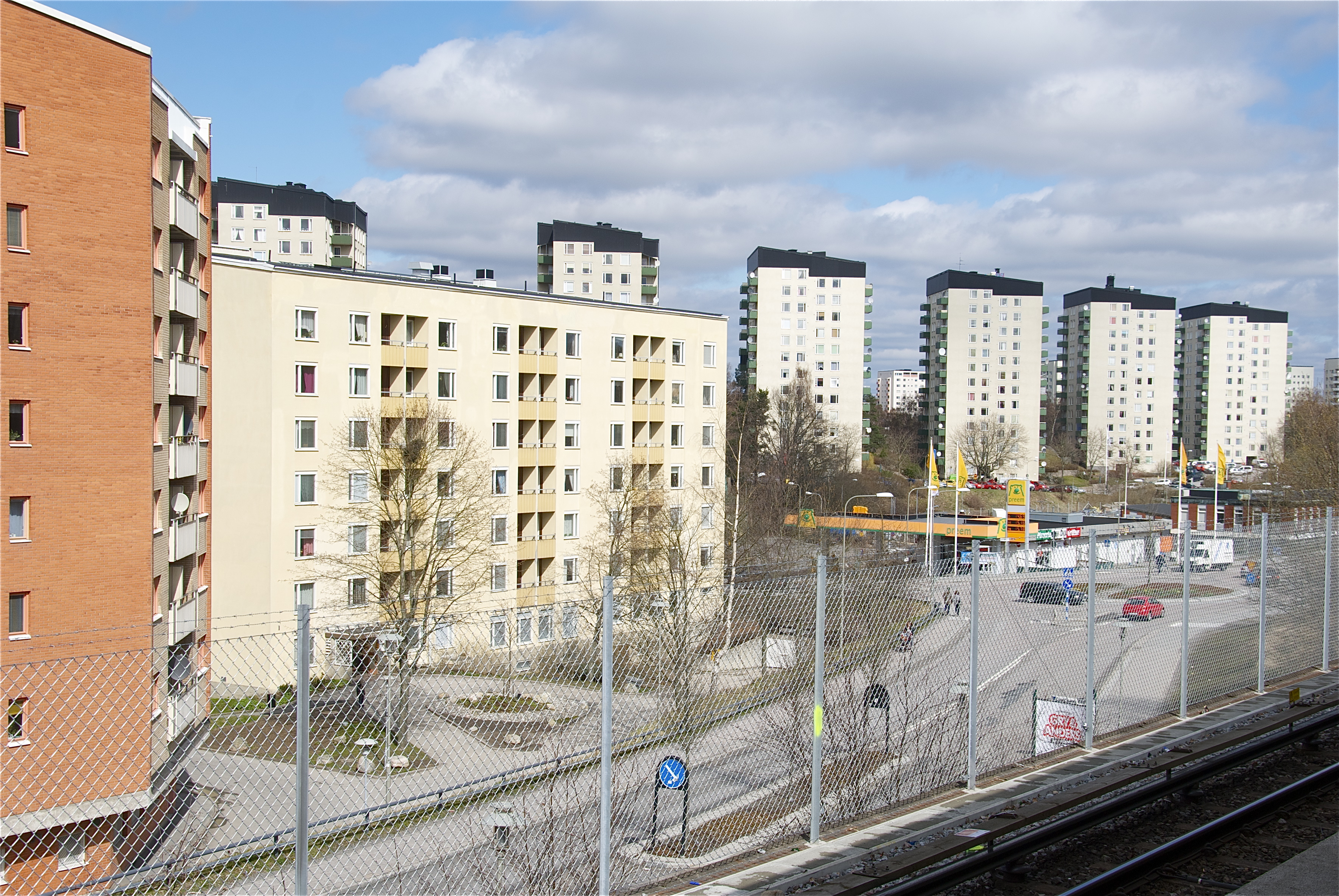
Buildings east of Rågsved centre

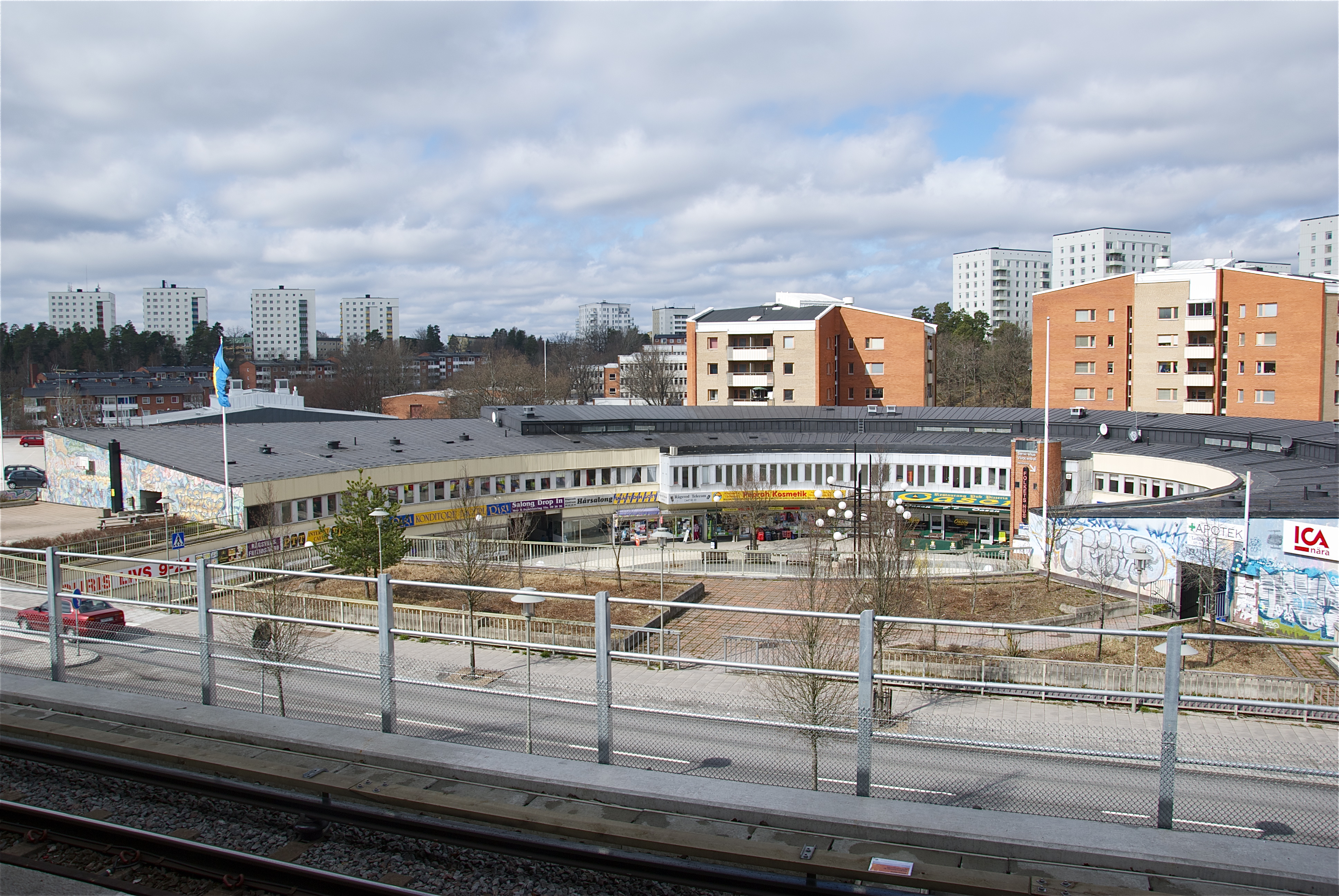
Rågsved centre as seen from the metro station

== Other Sources ==
- Rågsved website
