= Bandhagen =

District of Stockholm

Coordinates: 59°16′05″N 18°03′04″E

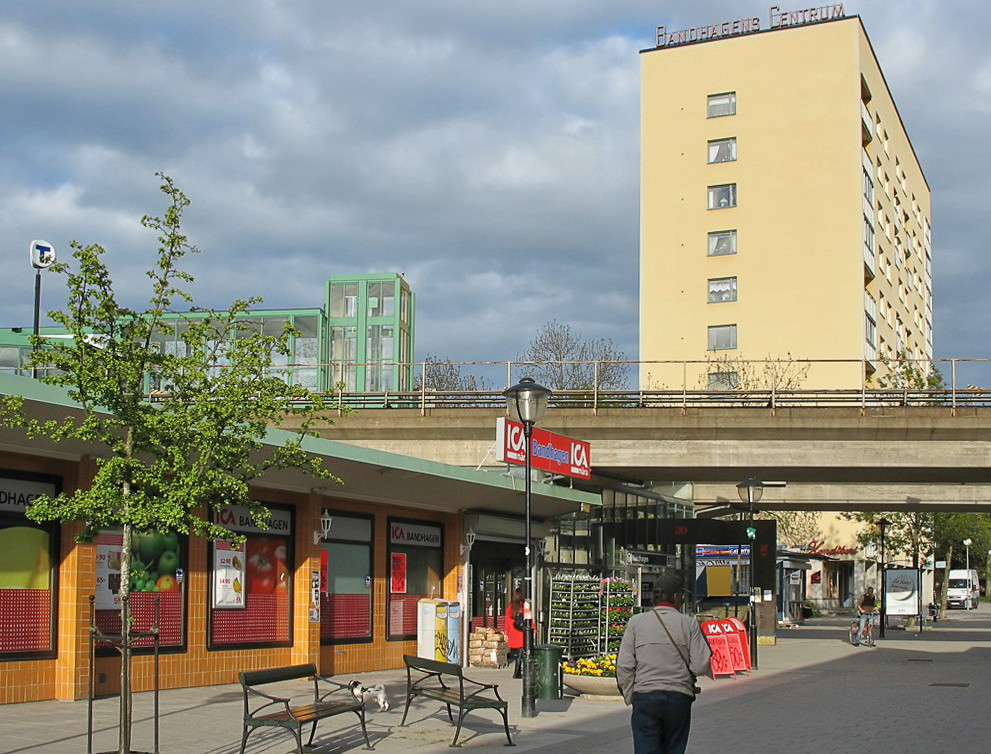
Bandhagen

Bandhagen is a suburban district south of Stockholm with 6,510 (2018) inhabitants. It is located in the Enskede-Årsta-Vantör borough neighboring Högdalen, Stureby and Örby.

The metro station with the same name was opened in 1954.

The progressive metal band Opeth formed in Bandhagen in 1989.

== Sports ==
The following sports clubs are located in Bandhagen:

- Rågsveds IF
