= Högdalen =

Coordinates: 59°15′48″N 18°2′33″E

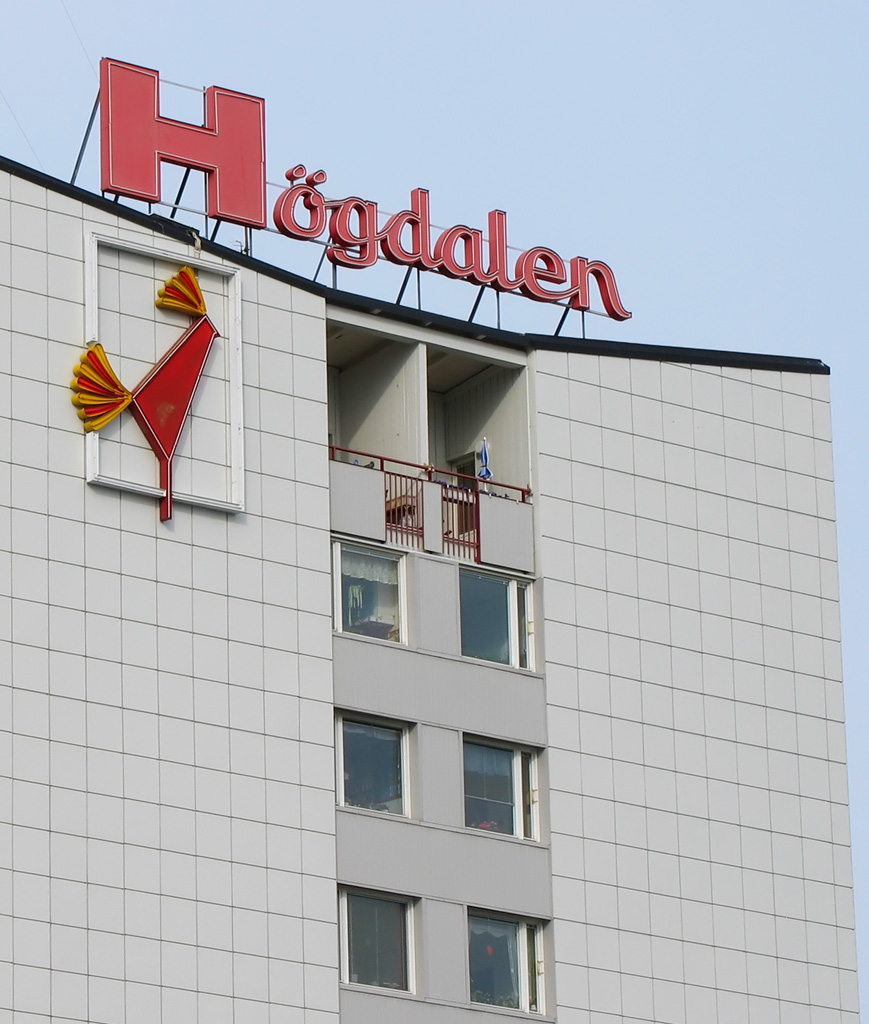
The neon rooster.

Högdalen (the High Valley) is a suburban district in South Stockholm, Sweden, built around the metro station with the same name on line 19. It was connected to Stockholm City Centre in 1954, three years after the town planning of the Högdalen district was approved.

Högdalen (High Valley) is roughly divided between the residential and commercial areas near the metro station in the centre and the industrial area and landfill further to the east. The inhabitants tend to vote mostly for the Social Democrats and the Left Party (in the election of 2006, the left block won with 55.7% of the votes). As of 2006 7,862 people lived in Högdalen, distributed across an area of 2.01 km^{2}, which gives a density of 3,911/km^{2}. The unemployment rate was 4.9%.

Notable landmarks in Högdalen are the neon rooster on top of an apartment block in the commercial area, and the golden rooster on top of the local church.

The independent theatre group Fria Teatern is based in Högdalen, where its main stage is located (there is a small one in Kungsholmen as well).

Högdalen is part of Vantör borough, together with four other suburban districts.
