= Enskedefältet =

Coordinates: 59°17′6.99″N 18°3′42.72″E

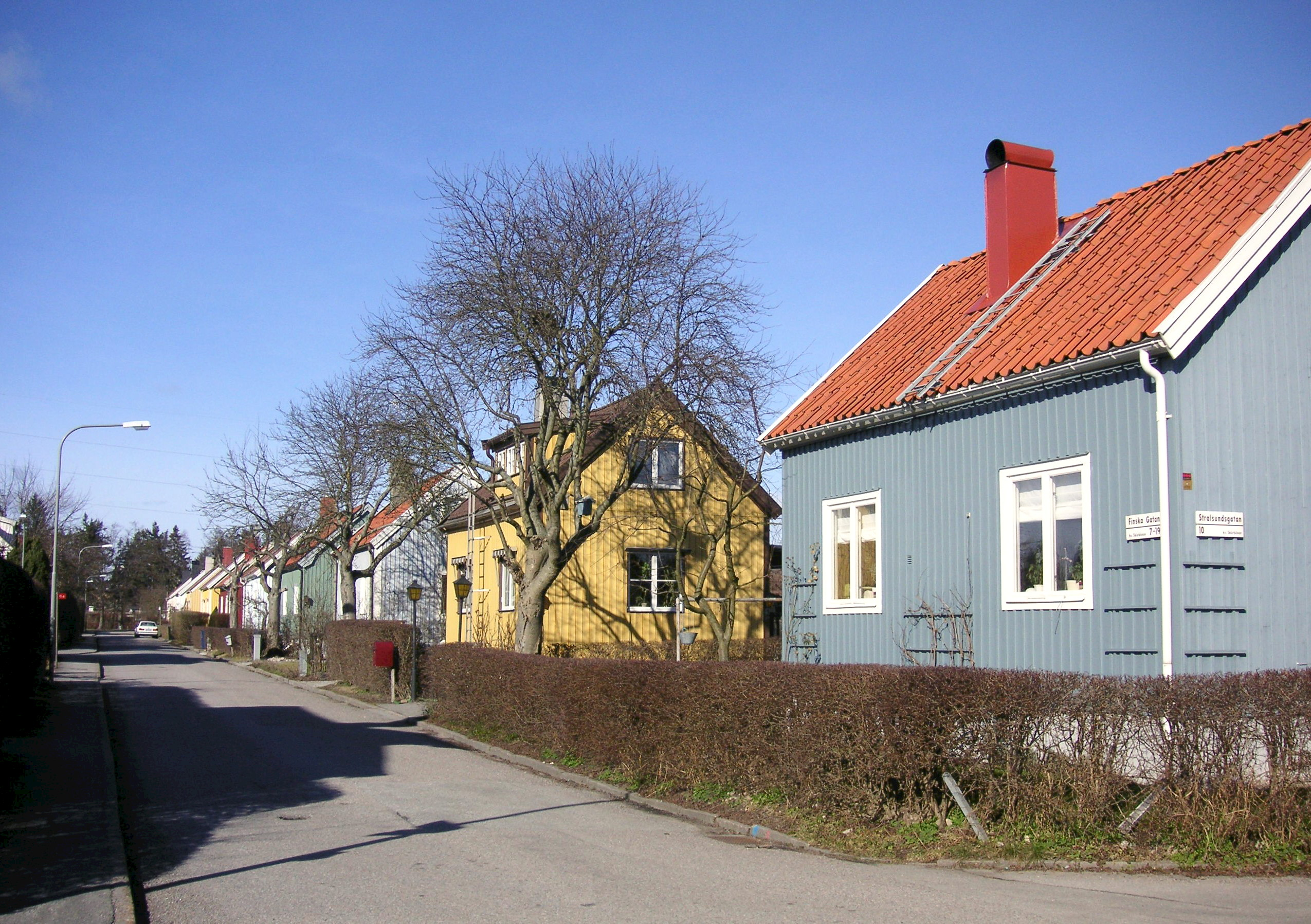
Typical houses in Enskedefältet (2008)

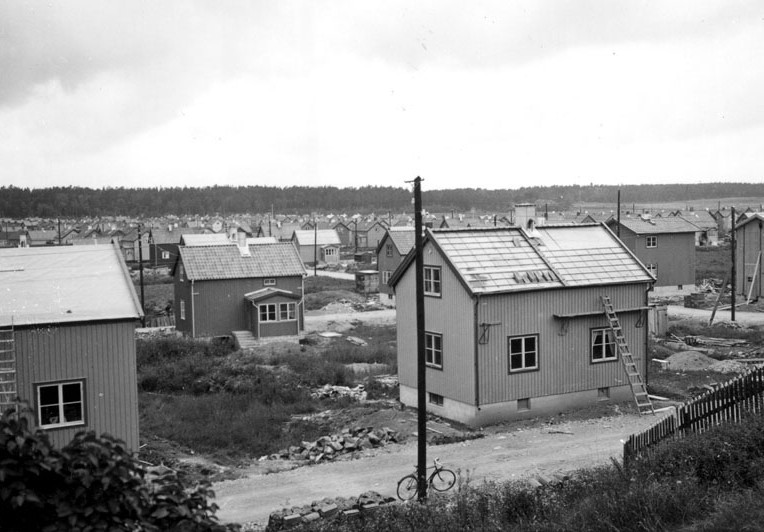
Enskedefältet while being built in 1932

Enskedefältet is a community of Söderort in Stockholm, Sweden.
