= Farsta =

District in Stockholm

Coordinates: 59°14′25″N 18°05′50″E

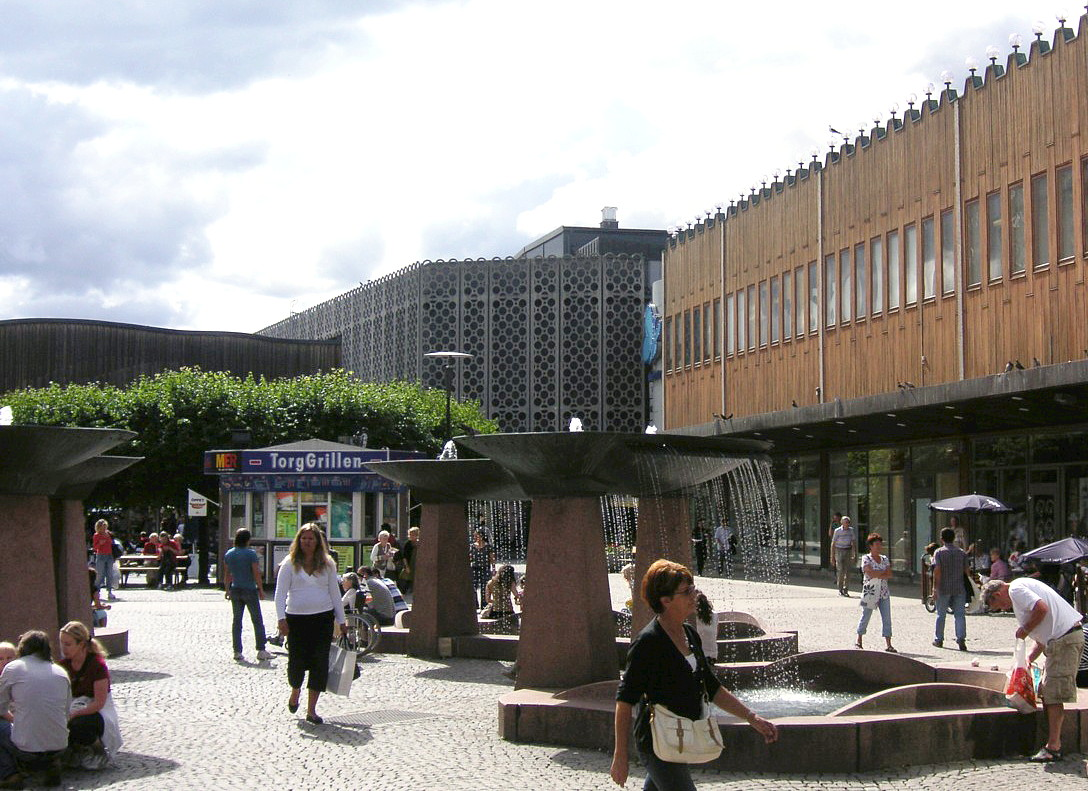
Square in Farsta.

Farsta is a district in the borough with the same name in the southern part of Stockholm Municipality, Sweden. Farsta is located about eight kilometers south of Stockholm city. The district neighbours to Hökarängen, Sköndal, Larsboda, Farsta Strand and Fagersjö. It is also a metro station on the Green line. The distance between the Stockholm City Centre and Farsta is 8 kilometres.

== Sports ==
The following sports clubs are located in Farsta:

- FOC Farsta
