= Tallkrogen =

Urban district in Stockholm, Sweden

Coordinates: 59°16′10″N 18°05′19″E

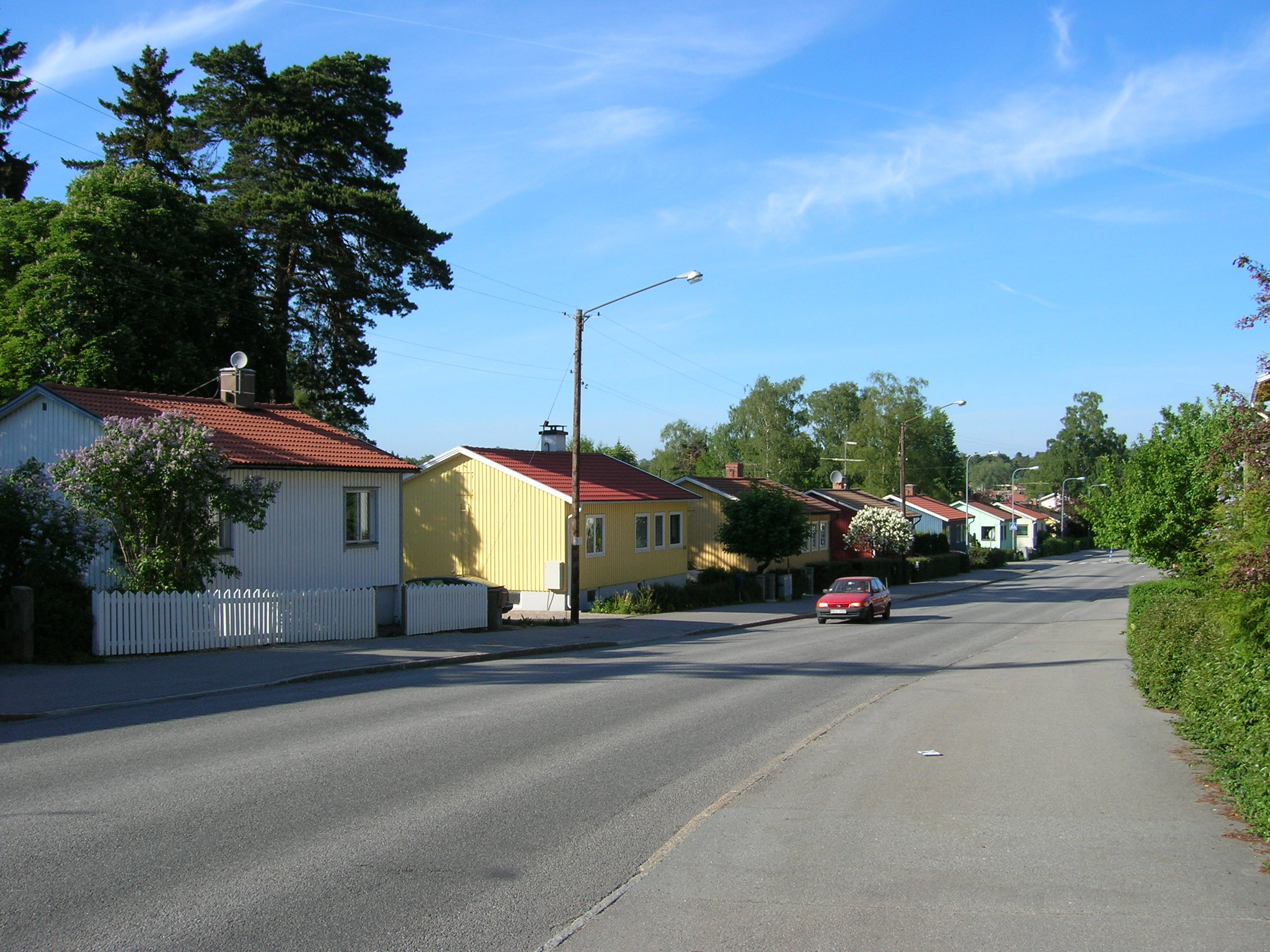
Tallkrogen.

Tallkrogen (Swedish for the "Pine Inn") is a suburban city district located south of central Stockholm, Sweden, but within the Stockholm Municipality.

== History ==
In Stockholm, construction of small cottage areas intended for working-class families began at Olovslund and Pungpinan in 1927, a municipal initiative which quickly proved a success. About 90% of the construction costs, at the time roughly SEK 10,000, could be financed by loans from the city, while the rest could be covered by the builder's own work. Soon, construction works had spread across various peripheral parts of the city, including Enskede and Åkeshov, and in 1931 the former of these saw its thousandth cottage.

Construction works at Tallkrogen started in 1933. Its plan contrasted both to the organic street networks of earlier garden cities and the straight avenues in the recently completed similar area Norra Ängby in Bromma. At Tallkrogen, the small buildings are aligned along curved streets forming the shape of a stadium, with the streets consequently named after athletics pioneers P H Ling and Viktor Balck and the blocks named after various Athletics events. Approximately 950 houses were built: Instead of the previously preferred one and a half-floor buildings, single-floor buildings were built at the centre of the area, while the peripheral buildings were made two floors. The building were delivered to the site as prefabricated elements — windows and doors already in place, chimneys made of concrete blocks with channels, and trusses assembled.

When completed in 1943, Tallkrogen as a result of prefabrication suffered of a lack of variation throughout, a problem since solved by later additions. The city, on its part, tries to limit changes to the backside of the houses it once helped to realise.
