= Gubbängen =

Urban district in Stockholm, Sweden

Coordinates: 59°15′46″N 18°04′55″E

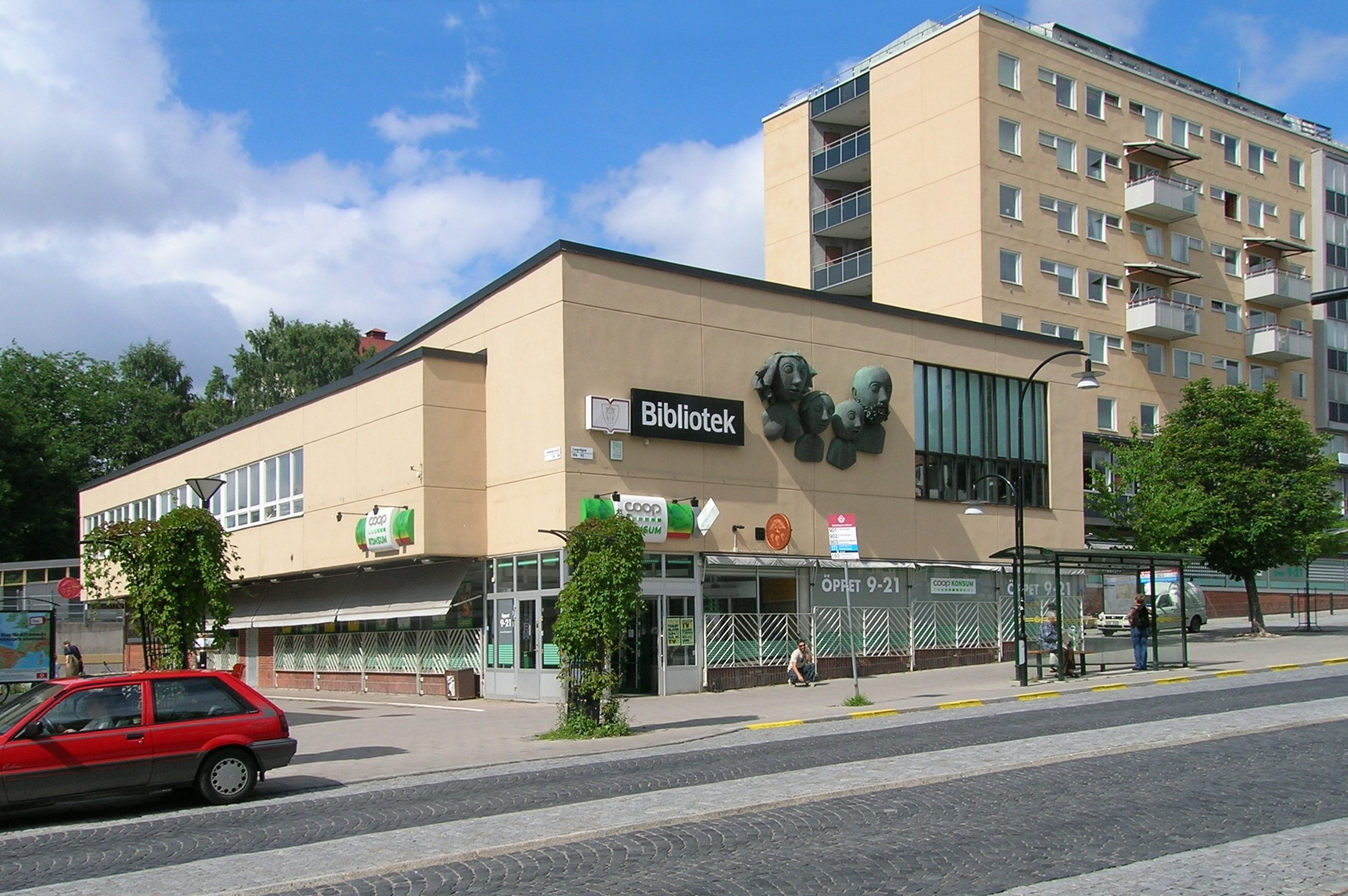
Gubbängen

See also Gubbängen metro station for the metro station.

Gubbängen is a suburban district in the southern part of Stockholm. The metro station was opened in 1950. Gubbängen is located in Farsta which is a borough (stadsdelsområde) in Söderort in the southern part of Stockholm Municipality. Gubbängen contains City, a former cinema from the 1950s which currently hosts live theatre, concerts, art exhibitions, film and occasional flea markets.
