= Skogskyrkogården metro station =

Stockholm Metro station

Skogskyrkogården
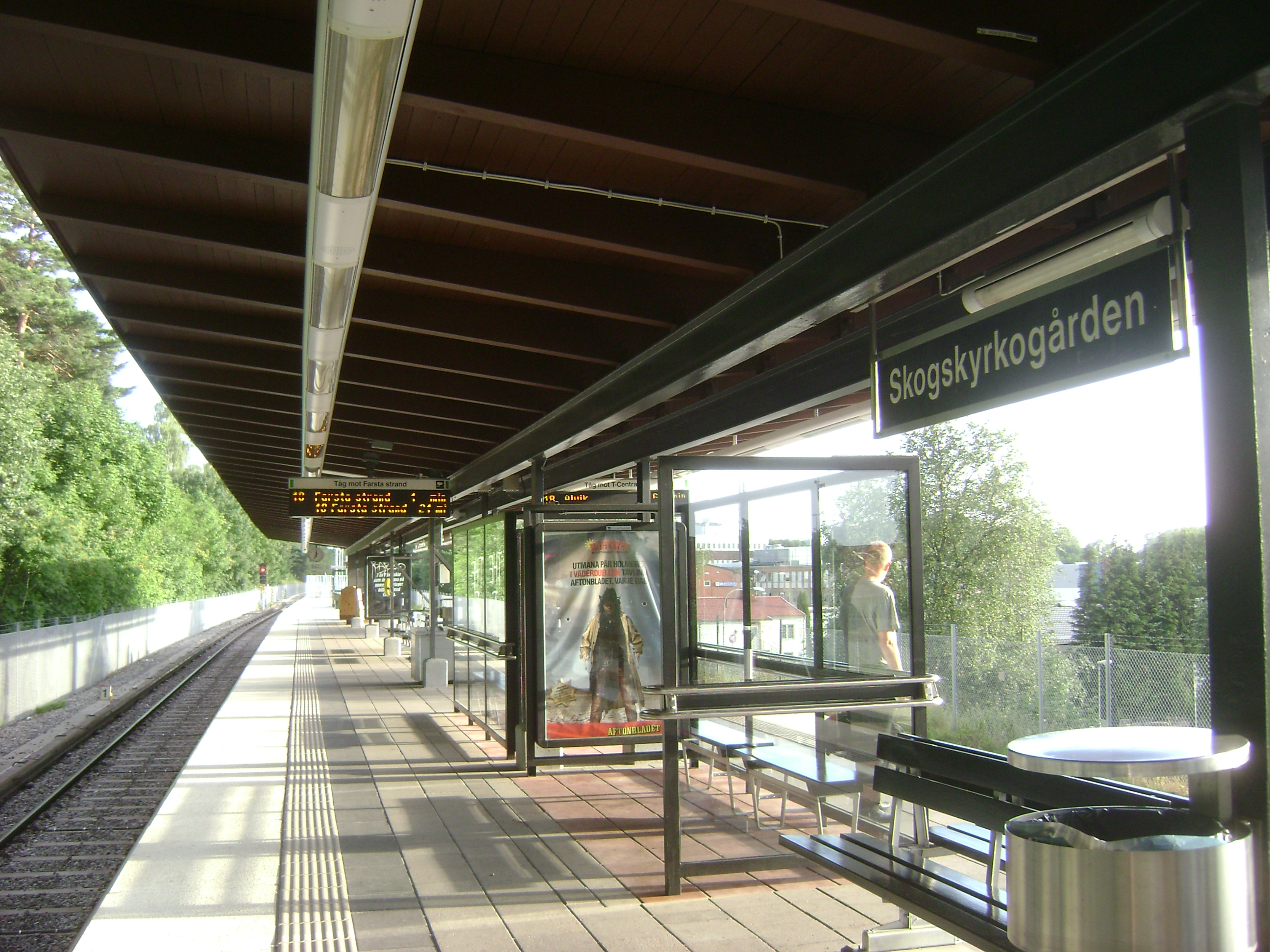

General information
- Coordinates: 59°16′41″N 18°05′43″E
- System: Stockholm Metro station
- Owner: Storstockholms Lokaltrafik
- Platforms: 1 island platform
- Tracks: 2

Construction
- Structure type: Elevated
- Accessible: Yes

Other information
- Station code: SKY

History
- Opened: 1 October 1950; 75 years ago

Passengers
- 2019: 2,050 boarding per weekday

Services
Preceding station	Stockholm Metro	Following station
Sandsborg towards Alvik	Line 18	Tallkrogen towards Farsta strand
Location
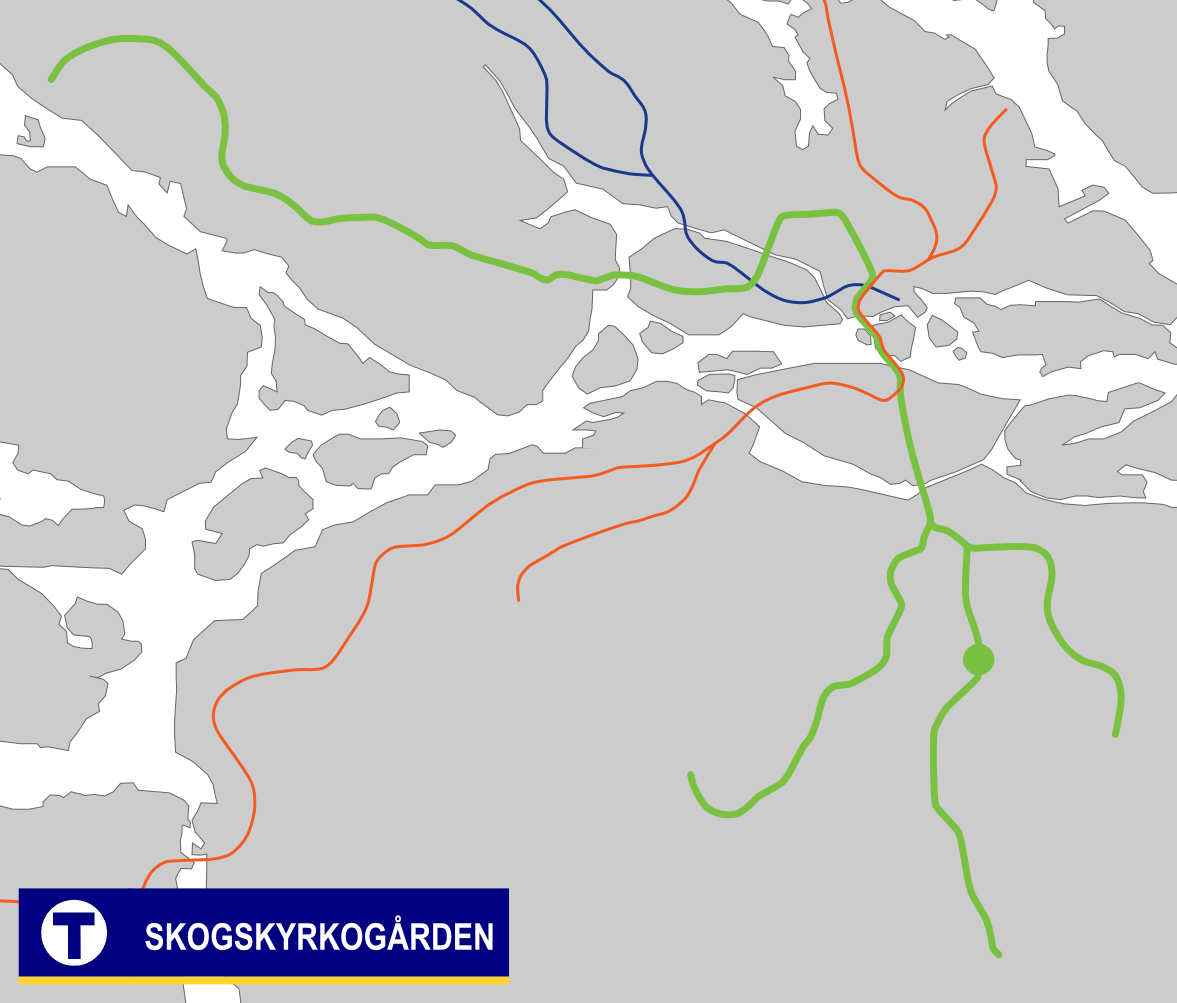

Skogskyrkogården metro station is a station on the Green Line of the Stockholm Metro, located in Gamla Enskede, Söderort, very close to the cemetery Skogskyrkogården (the Woodland Cemetery). The station was opened on 1 October 1950 as part of the inaugural stretch of the Stockholm Metro between Slussen and Hökarängen. The distance to Slussen is 5 km (3.1 mi).
