= Sandsborg metro station =

Stockholm Metro station

Sandsborg
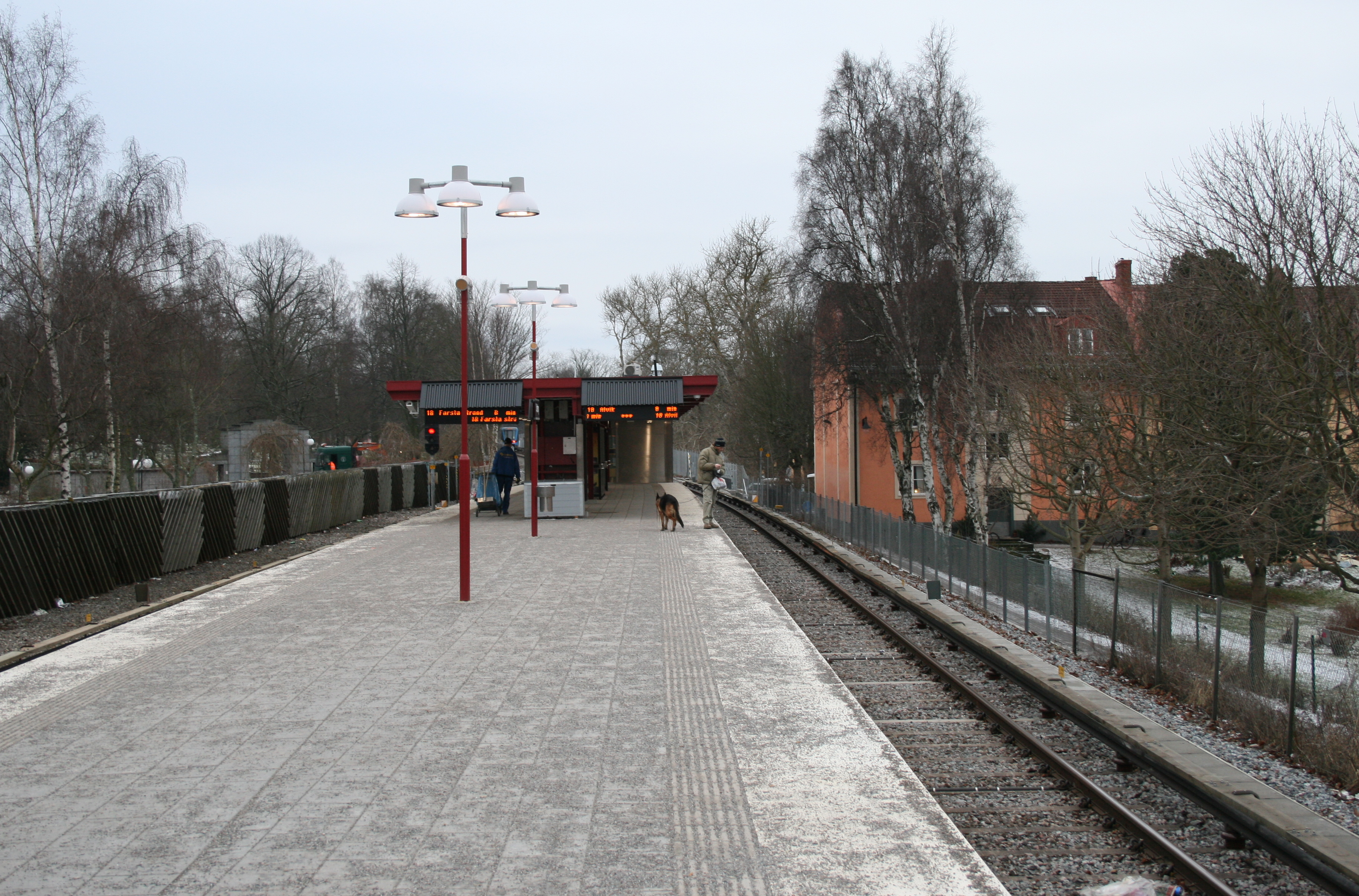

General information
- Coordinates: 59°17′06″N 18°05′32″E
- System: Stockholm Metro station
- Owner: Storstockholms Lokaltrafik
- Platforms: 1 island platform
- Tracks: 2

Construction
- Structure type: Elevated
- Accessible: Yes

Other information
- Station code: SAB

History
- Opened: 1 October 1950; 75 years ago

Passengers
- 2019: 3,700 boarding per weekday

Services
Preceding station	Stockholm Metro	Following station
Blåsut towards Alvik	Line 18	Skogskyrkogården towards Farsta strand
Location
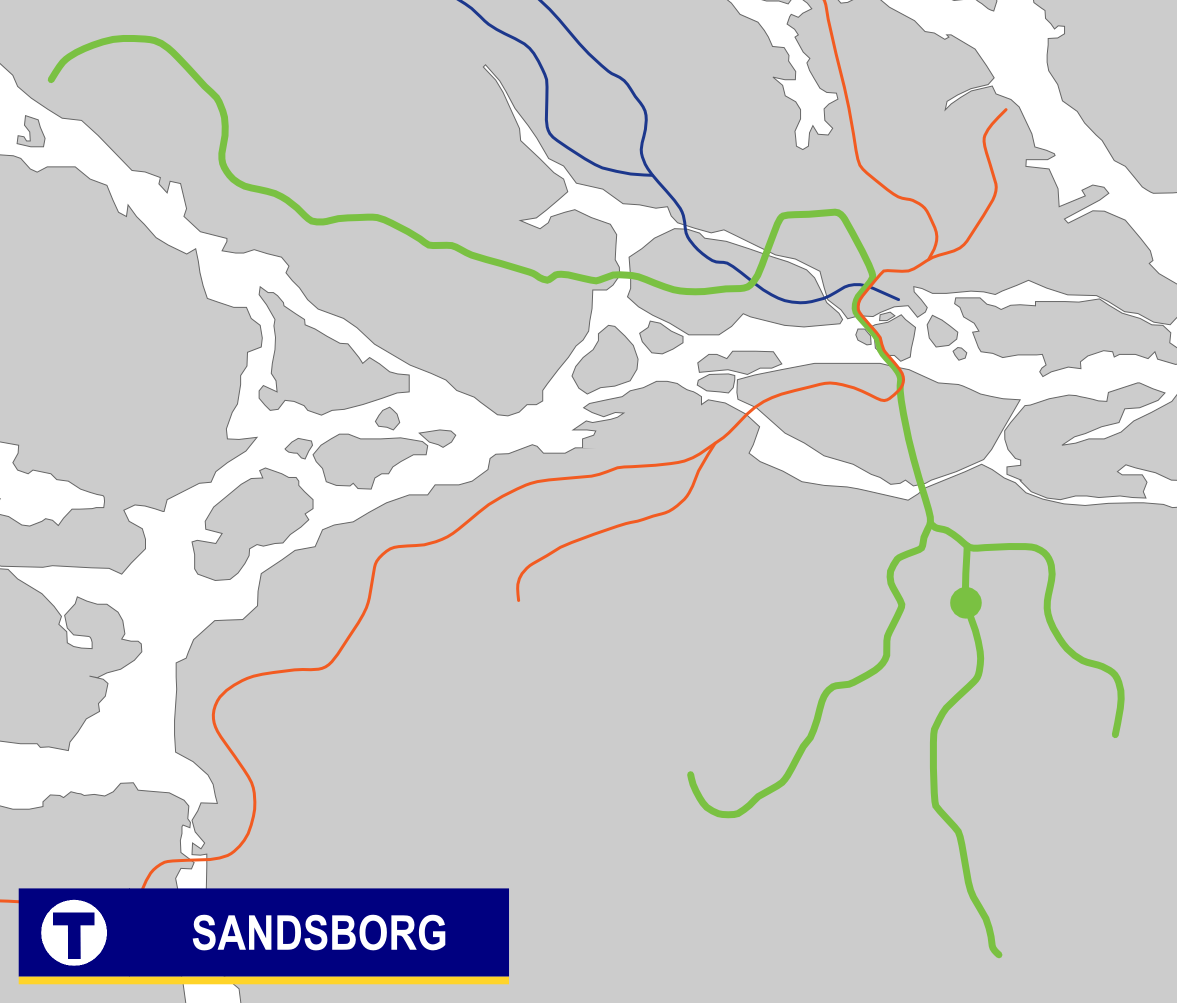

Sandsborg metro station is a station on the Green Line of the Stockholm Metro, located in Gamla Enskede, Söderort. The station was inaugurated on 1 October 1950 as part of the inaugural stretch of Stockholm metro between Slussen and Hökarängen. The distance to Slussen is 4.4 km (2.7 mi).
