= Valborg Svensson =

Swedish journalist and politician (1903–1983)

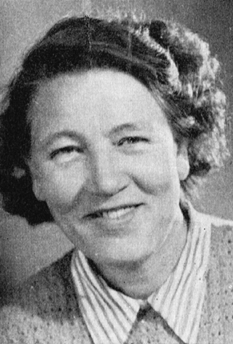

Member of the Stockholm city council
- In office 1942–1962

Personal details
- Born: Greta Valborg Elisabet Svensson; 29 January 1903 Huskvarna, Jönköping, Sweden
- Died: 20 April 1983 (aged 80) Bromma parish, Stockholm county, Sweden
- Resting place: Skogskyrkogården, Gamla Enskede, Stockholm
- Party: Communist Party

Valborg Svensson (29 January 1903 – 20 April 1983) was a Swedish communist politician and journalist. She was a long-term member of the Stockholm city council and contributed to various publications of the Communist Party.

== Early life ==
Svensson was born in Huskvarna, Jönköping, on 29 January 1903. Her mother died when she was 7. Her father married again, and she was adopted by a teacher when the family had more children.

At 15 she began to work as a maid and then became a worker at a textile factory in Jönköping between 1923 and 1927.

== Political activities ==
Svensson joined the Communist Party in 1928. She was a board member of a publication entitled Arbetarkvinnornas tidning (Swedish: Working women’s paper) from 1930 which was affiliated with the Communist Party. She also edited a section of the communist newspaper, Ny Dag. She received political training in Moscow from 1930 to 1933. Upon her return to Sweden she served in the central committee of the Communist Party in the period 1933–1936. She went to Bergen, Norway, where she contributed to the activities of the labor movement between 1936 and 1938. In 1942 she was elected to the Stockholm city council for the Communist Party. Following World War II she became a member of the Svenska Kvinnors Vänsterförbund (SKV; Swedish women's leftist federation), an organization affiliated with the Women's International Democratic Federation. In the 1950s she was part of the editorial board of Vi kvinnor i democratikt worldförbund, a publication of the Communist Party. Svennson served in the Stockholm city council until 1962.

== Personal life and death ==
Svensson married a Norwegian journalist, Arvid G. Hansen, in 1931. They divorced in 1939. She died in Bromma parish, Stockholm county, on 20 April 1983. She was buried at Skogskyrkogården in Gamla Enskede, Stockholm.
