= Gubbängen metro station =

Stockholm Metro station

Gubbängen
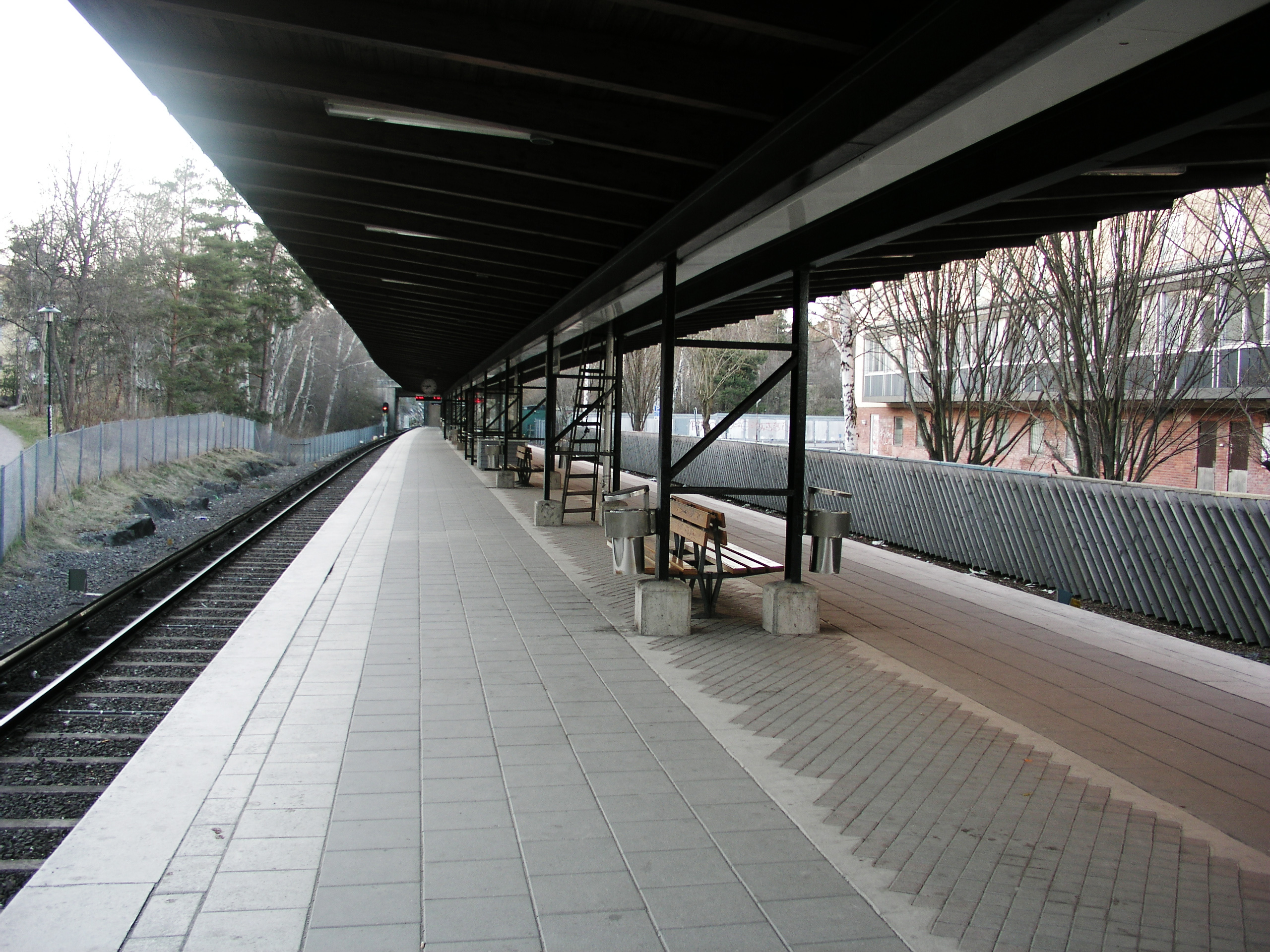

General information
- Coordinates: 59°15′46″N 18°04′55″E
- System: Stockholm Metro station
- Owner: Storstockholms Lokaltrafik
- Platforms: 1 island platform
- Tracks: 2

Construction
- Structure type: At grade
- Accessible: Yes

Other information
- Station code: GUÄ

History
- Opened: 1 October 1950; 75 years ago

Passengers
- 2019: 4,400 boarding per weekday

Services
Preceding station	Stockholm Metro	Following station
Tallkrogen towards Alvik	Line 18	Hökarängen towards Farsta strand
Location
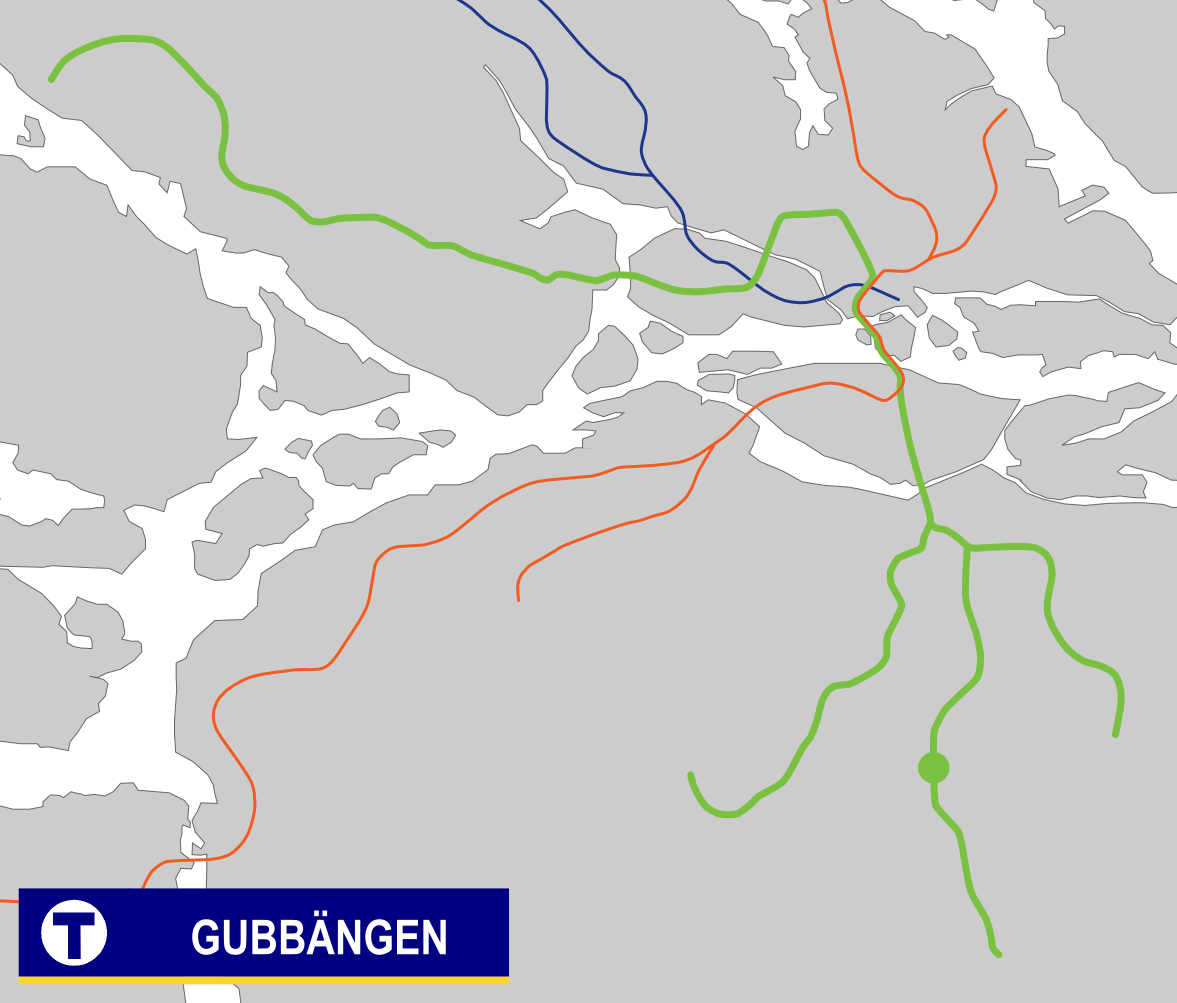

Gubbängen metro station is on the Green Line (Line 18) of the Stockholm Metro, located in Gubbängen, Söderort. The station was inaugurated on 1 October 1950 as part of the inaugural stretch of Stockholm metro between Slussen and Hökarängen. The distance to Slussen is 6.7 km (4.2 mi).

The station was put into use on October 1, 1950, when the subway line Slussen–Hökarängen was inaugurated. Towards the south, the track is led on a viaduct over Gubbängsfältet.

The station has an outdoor platform along Lingvägen and Gubbängstorget. The entrance is reached via an underpass either from Herrhagsvägen or from Gubbängstorget / Knektvägen.

The artistic decoration consists of the work Guardians, two bronze sculptures by Ragnhild Alexandersson, from 1994.
