= Farsta metro station =

Stockholm Metro station

Farsta
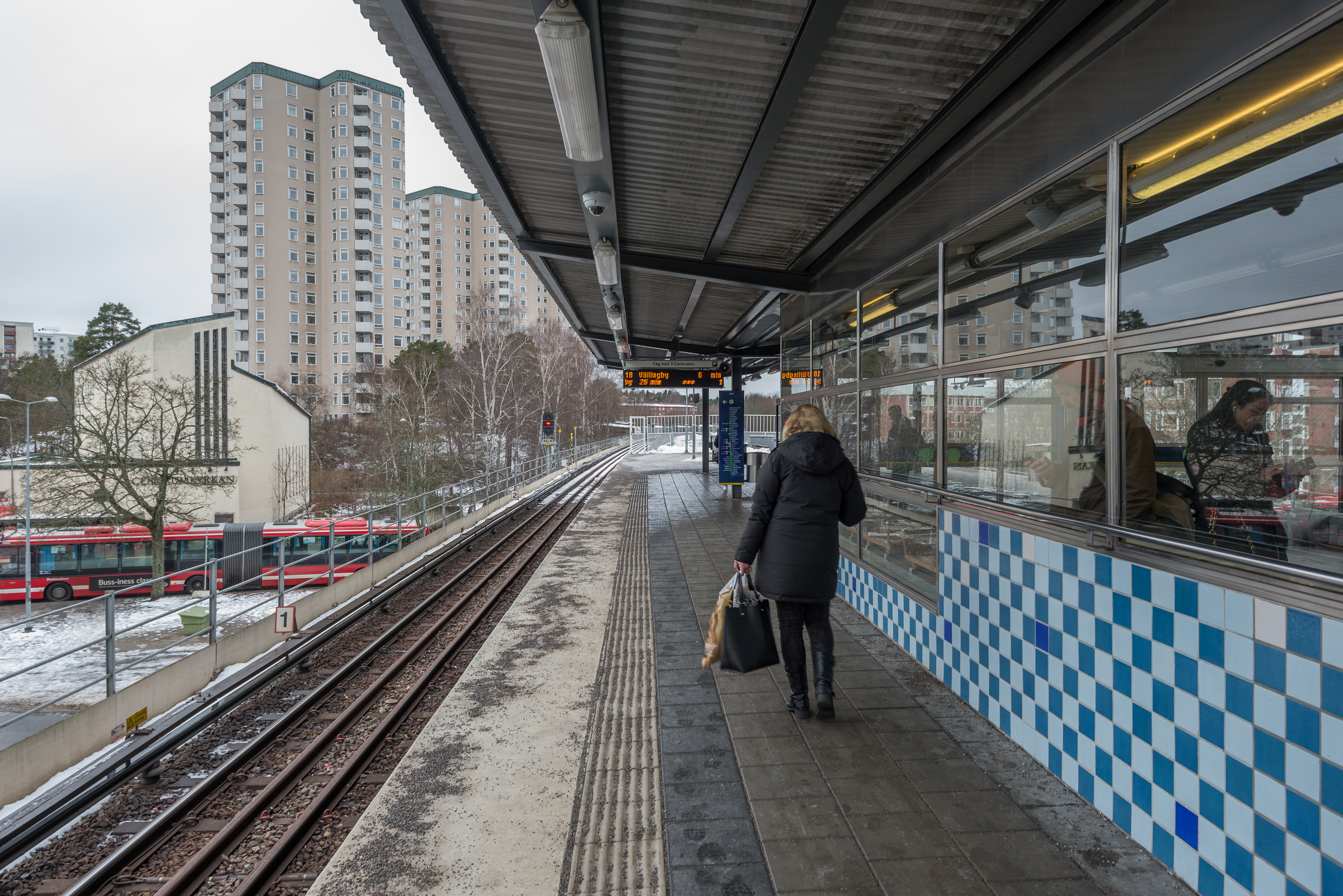

General information
- Coordinates: 59°14′36″N 18°05′38″E
- System: Stockholm Metro station
- Owner: Storstockholms Lokaltrafik
- Platforms: 1 island platform
- Tracks: 2

Construction
- Structure type: Elevated
- Accessible: Yes

Other information
- Station code: FAR

History
- Opened: 4 November 1960; 65 years ago

Passengers
- 2019: 10,400 boarding per weekday

Services
Preceding station	Stockholm Metro	Following station
Hökarängen towards Alvik	Line 18	Farsta strand Terminus
Location
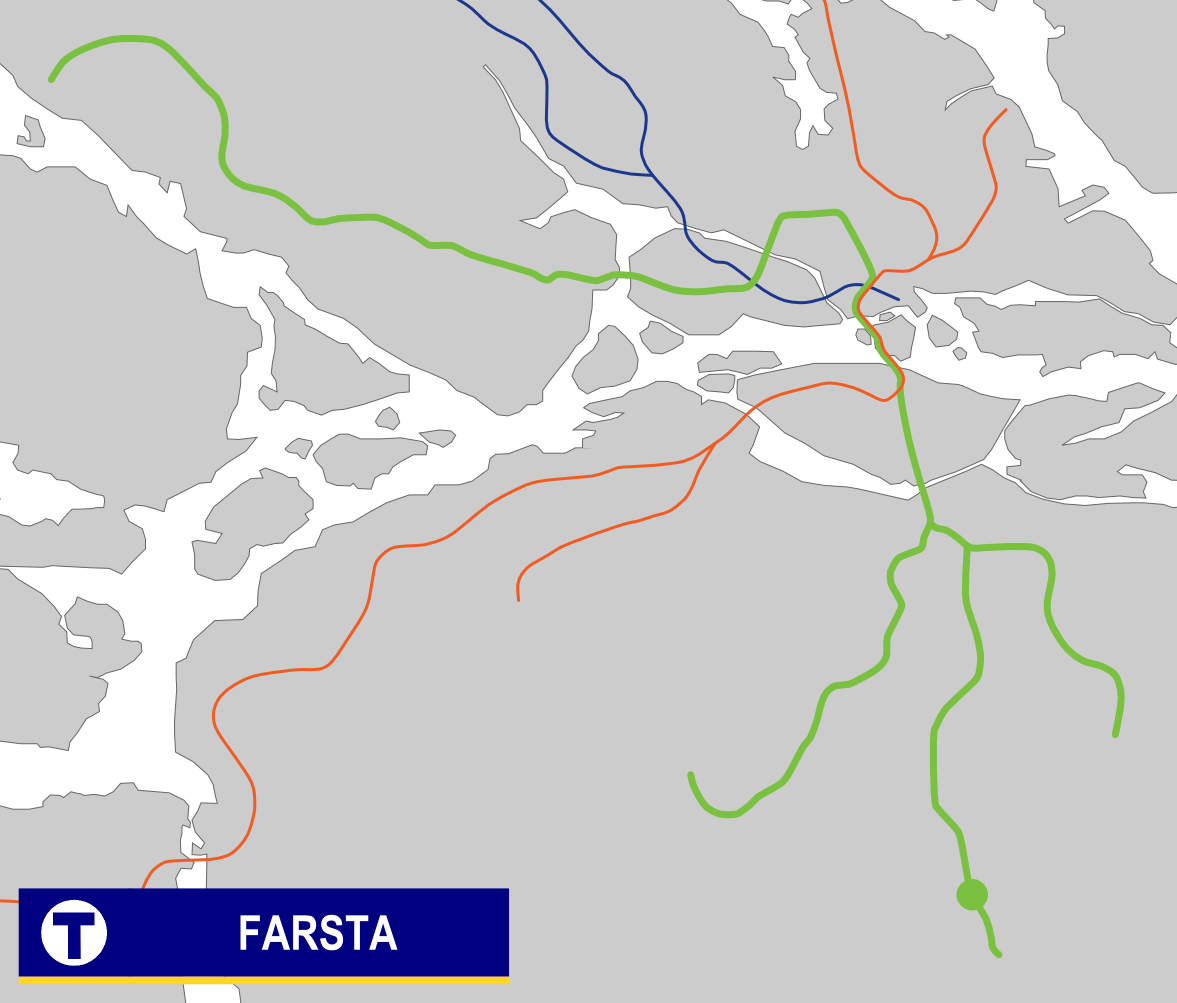

Farsta metro station is a station on the Green Line of the Stockholm Metro, located in Farsta, Söderort. The station was inaugurated on 18 November 1958 when the one-station extension from Hökarängen was completed. A temporary station functioned until 4 November 1960, when the permanent station was opened. On 29 August 1971, the line was extended further to Farsta strand. The distance to Slussen is 9.4 km (5.8 mi).

== Gallery ==
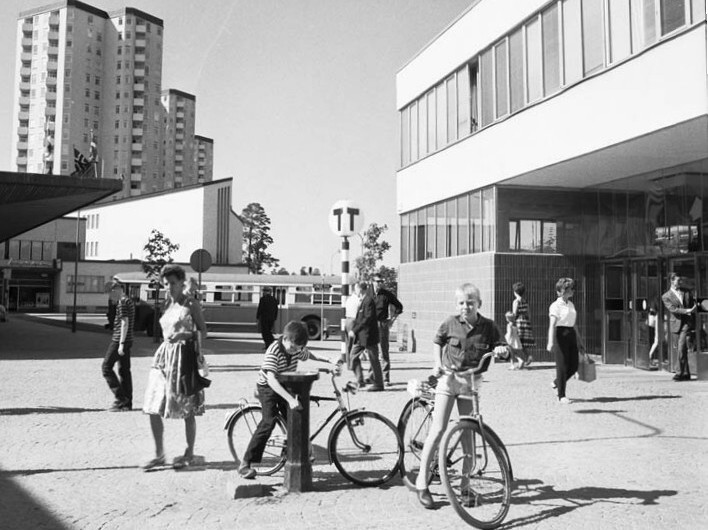
Farsta metro station in 1963

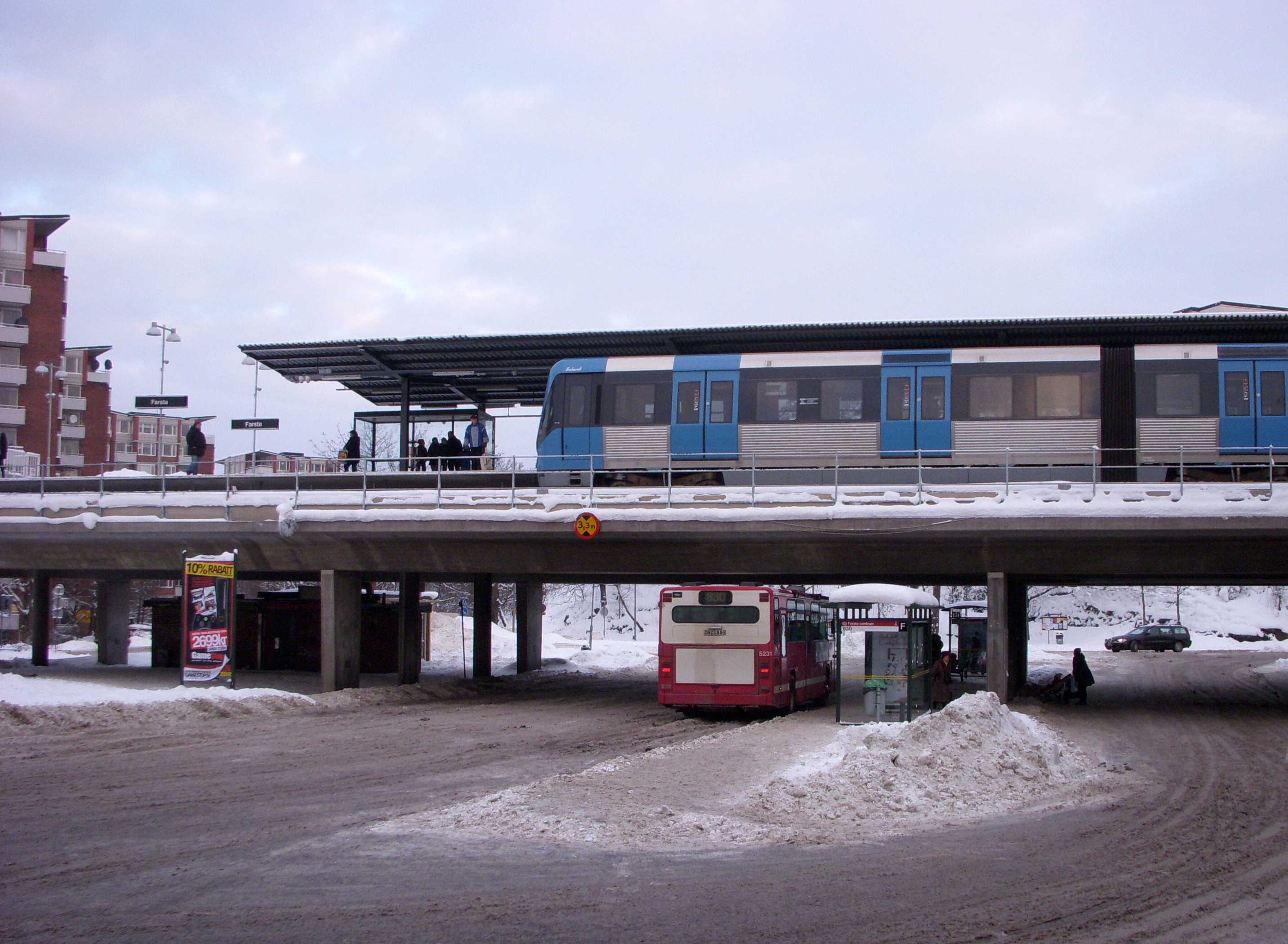
Train at Farsta

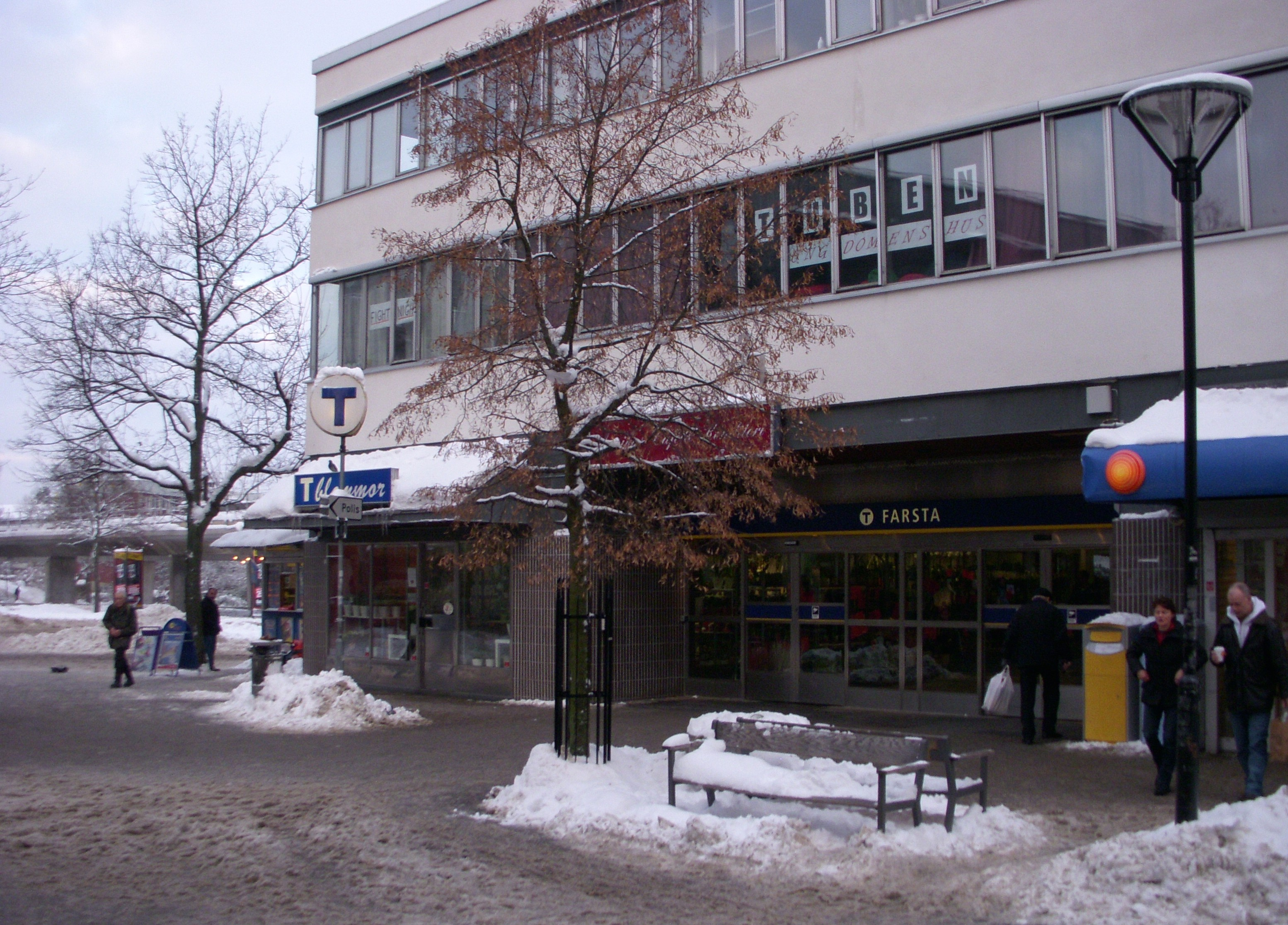
Farsta metro station

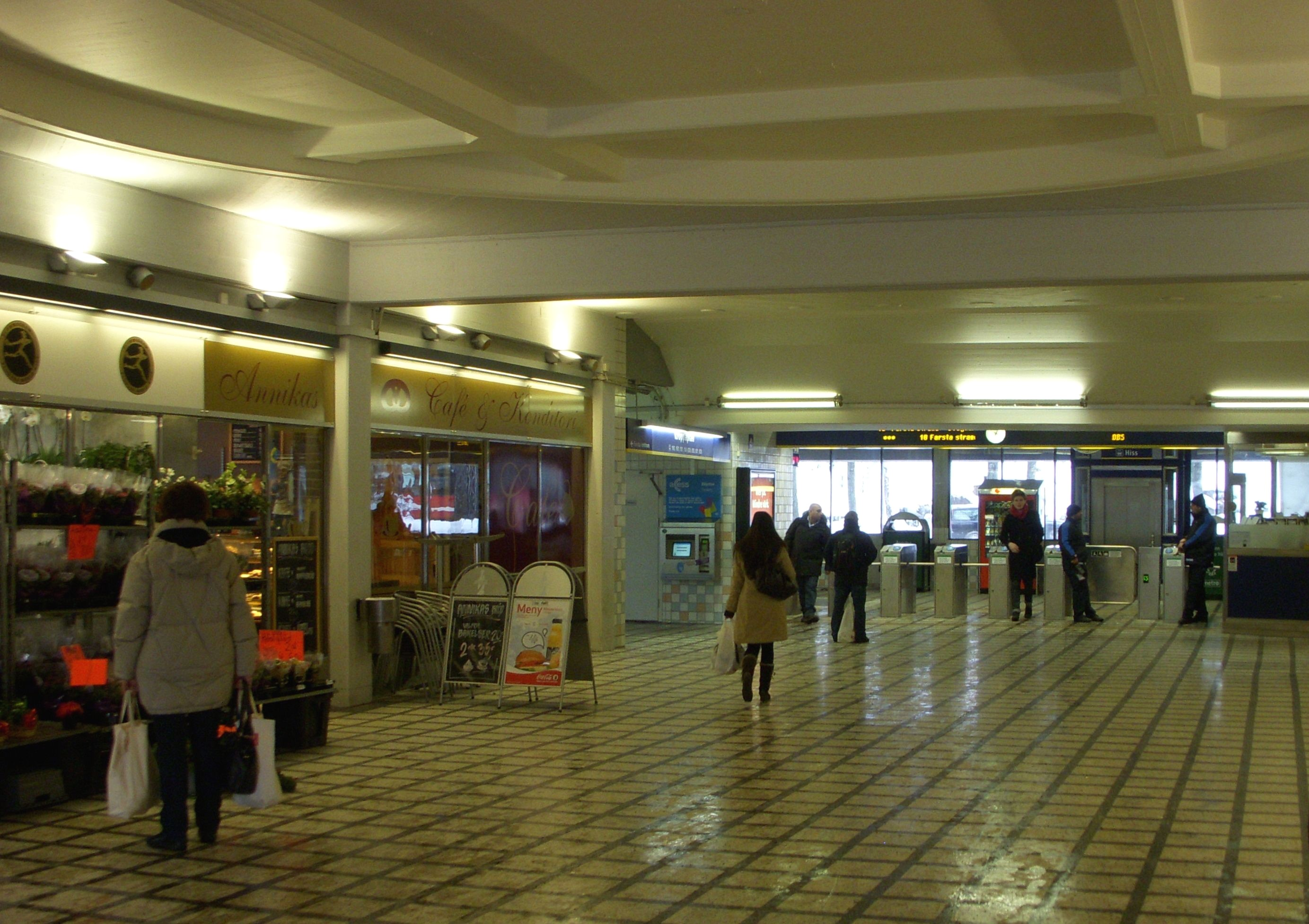
Farsta metro station inside
