= Gamla Enskede =

Coordinates: 59°17′4.26″N 18°4′53.32″E

Location of Enskede-Årsta-Vantör borough

Gamla Enskede (Swedish: "Old Enskede") is a district of Enskede-Årsta-Vantör borough, South Stockholm, Sweden. In addition to housing areas, the district includes the Skogskyrkogården woodland cemetery and the smaller Sandsborgskyrkogården cemetery.

== History ==
Gamla Enskede was created in 1904 to provide housing for workers, and is 2.94 square kilometres (1.14 sq mi). The architectural type known as "the Enskede villa," with pointed roofs on wooden houses, originated in Gamla Enskede. The streets are built to look like a "typical English" garden city, therefore not one street is completely straight but instead the streets are crooked and bent. As of 31 December 2003, the district's population was 10,064, with a population density of 3,423.13 people per square kilometre. There are two Stockholm Metro stations: Sandsborg and Skogskyrkogården, since 1950. Previously the area was served by two suburban tramway routes.

== Notable people ==
Among the inhabitants are singer and actress Helen Sjöholm and the singer of Bo Kaspers Orkester, Bo Kasper and the former finance minister of the Social Democratic government, Bo Ringholm and the author Camilla Läckberg. The folk singer Sofia Karlsson was born and grew up in the district.

== Sports ==
The following sports clubs are located in Enskede:

- Enskede IK
