= Hökarängen metro station =

Stockholm Metro station

Hökarängen
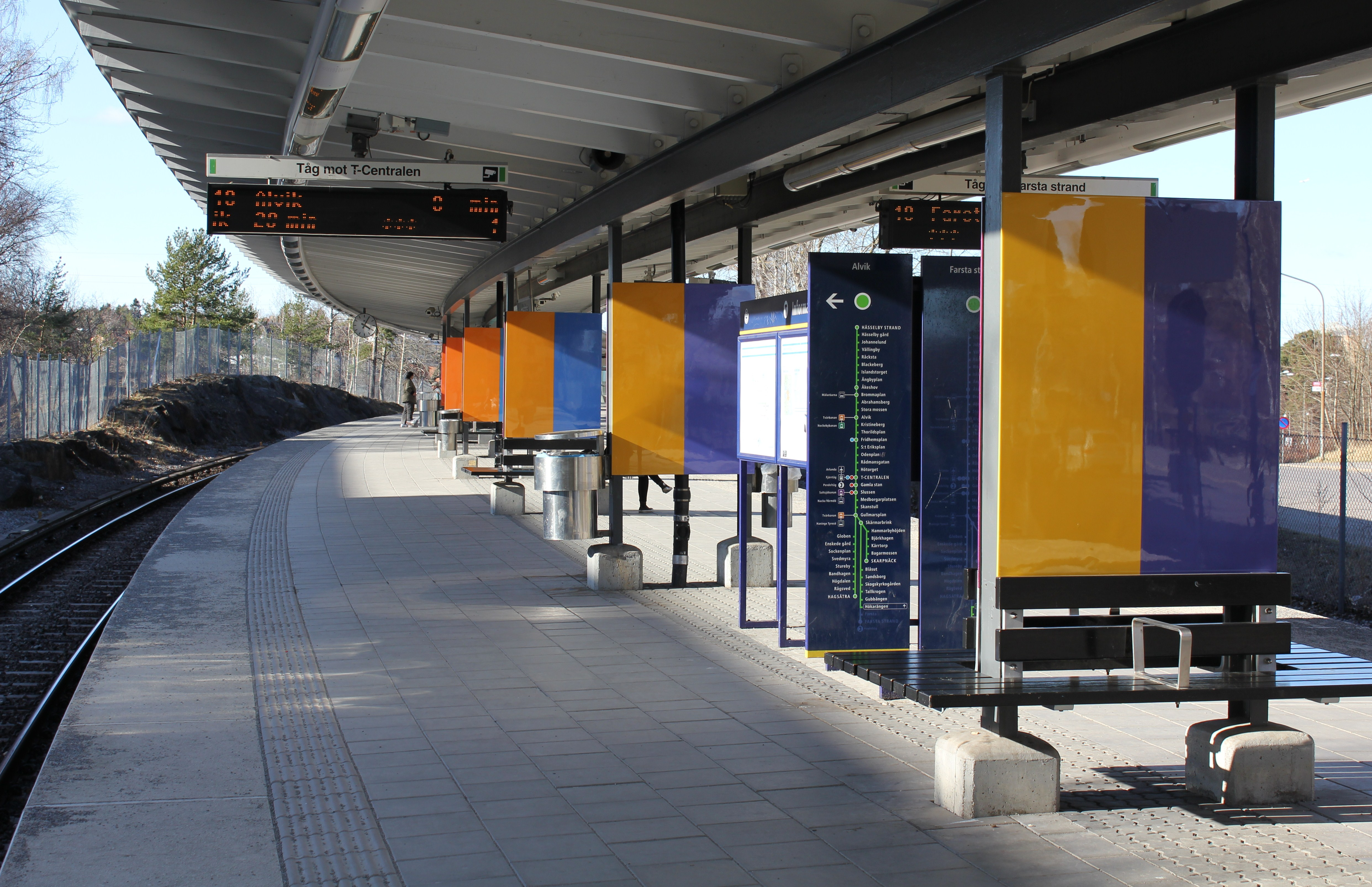

General information
- Coordinates: 59°15′28″N 18°04′57″E
- System: Stockholm Metro station
- Owner: Storstockholms Lokaltrafik
- Platforms: 1 island platform
- Tracks: 2

Construction
- Structure type: Elevated
- Accessible: Yes

Other information
- Station code: HÖÄ

History
- Opened: 1 October 1950; 75 years ago

Passengers
- 2019: 5,800 boarding per weekday

Services
Preceding station	Stockholm Metro	Following station
Gubbängen towards Alvik	Line 18	Farsta towards Farsta strand
Location
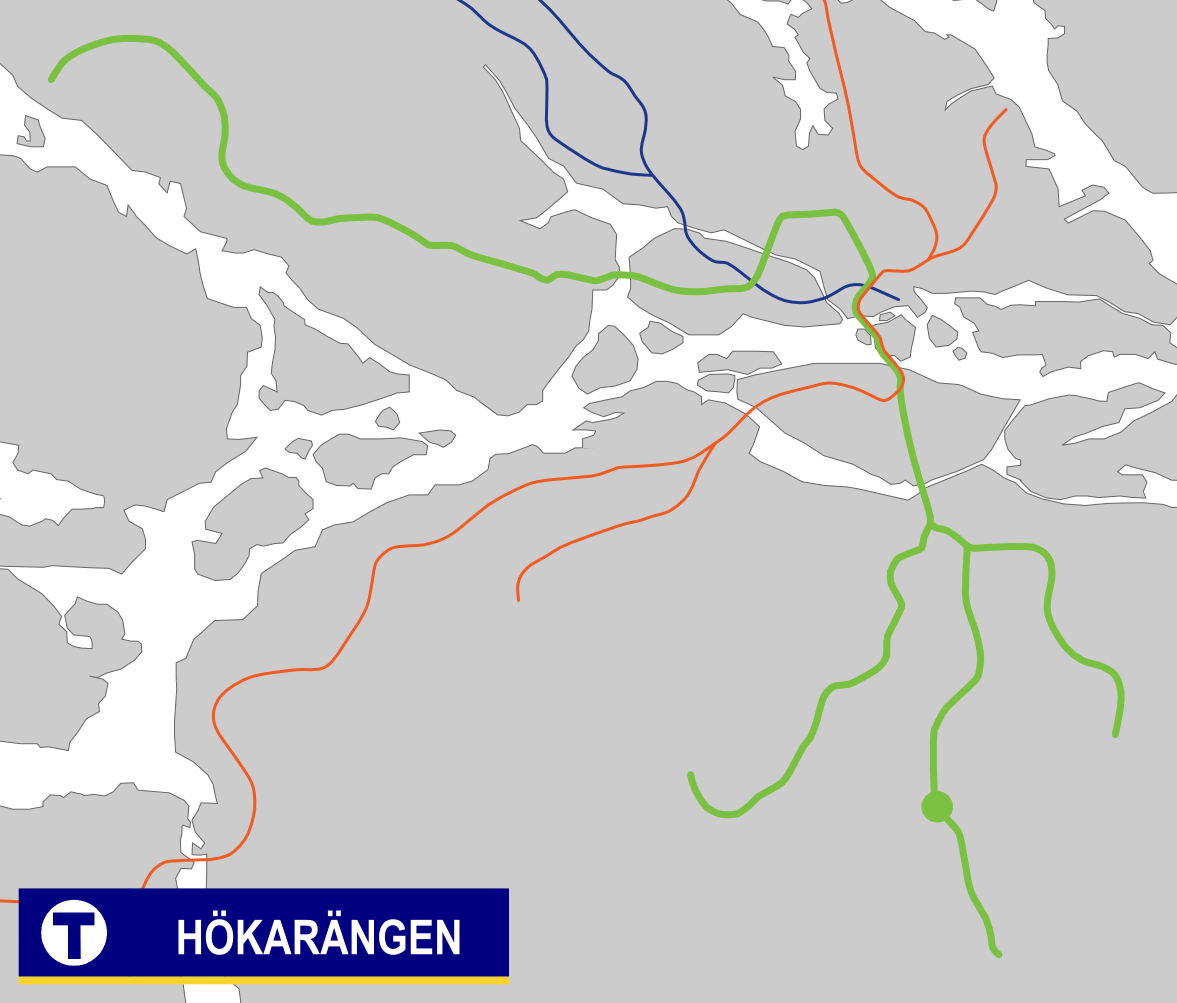

Hökarängen metro station is a station on the Green Line of the Stockholm Metro, located in Hökarängen, Söderort. The station was inaugurated on 1 October 1950 as part of the inaugural stretch of the Stockholm Metro between Slussen and Hökarängen. On 18 November 1958 the line was extended south to Farsta. The distance to Slussen is 7.7 km (4.8 mi).
