= Farsta strand metro station =

Stockholm Metro station

Farsta strand
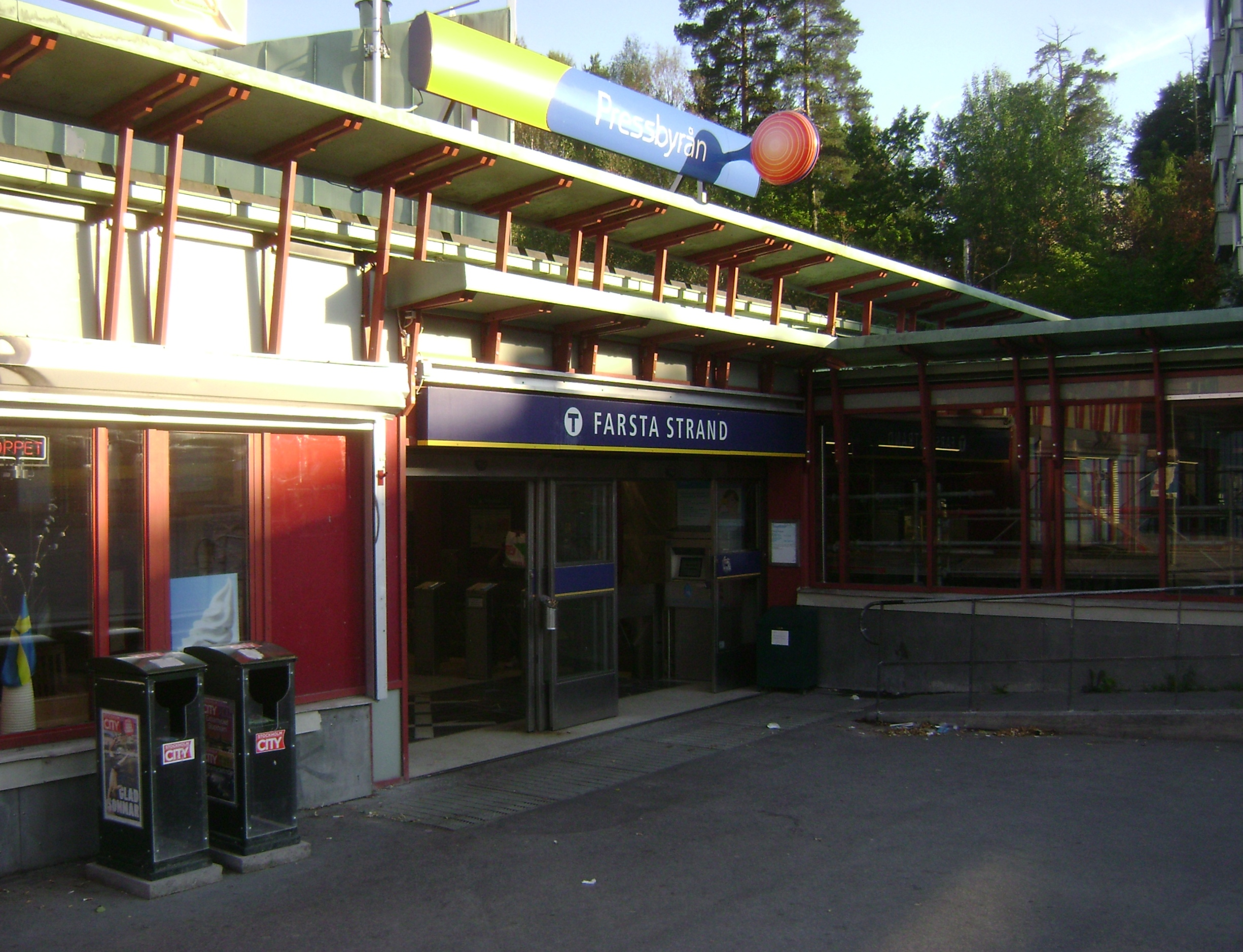

General information
- Coordinates: 59°14′6″N 18°06′4″E
- System: Stockholm Metro station
- Owner: Storstockholms Lokaltrafik
- Platforms: 1 island platform
- Tracks: 2

Construction
- Structure type: Underground
- Depth: 5 m (16 ft)
- Accessible: Yes

Other information
- Station code: FAS

History
- Opened: 29 August 1971; 55 years ago

Passengers
- 2019: 4,400 boarding per weekday

Services
Preceding station	Stockholm Metro	Following station
Farsta towards Alvik	Line 18	Terminus
Location
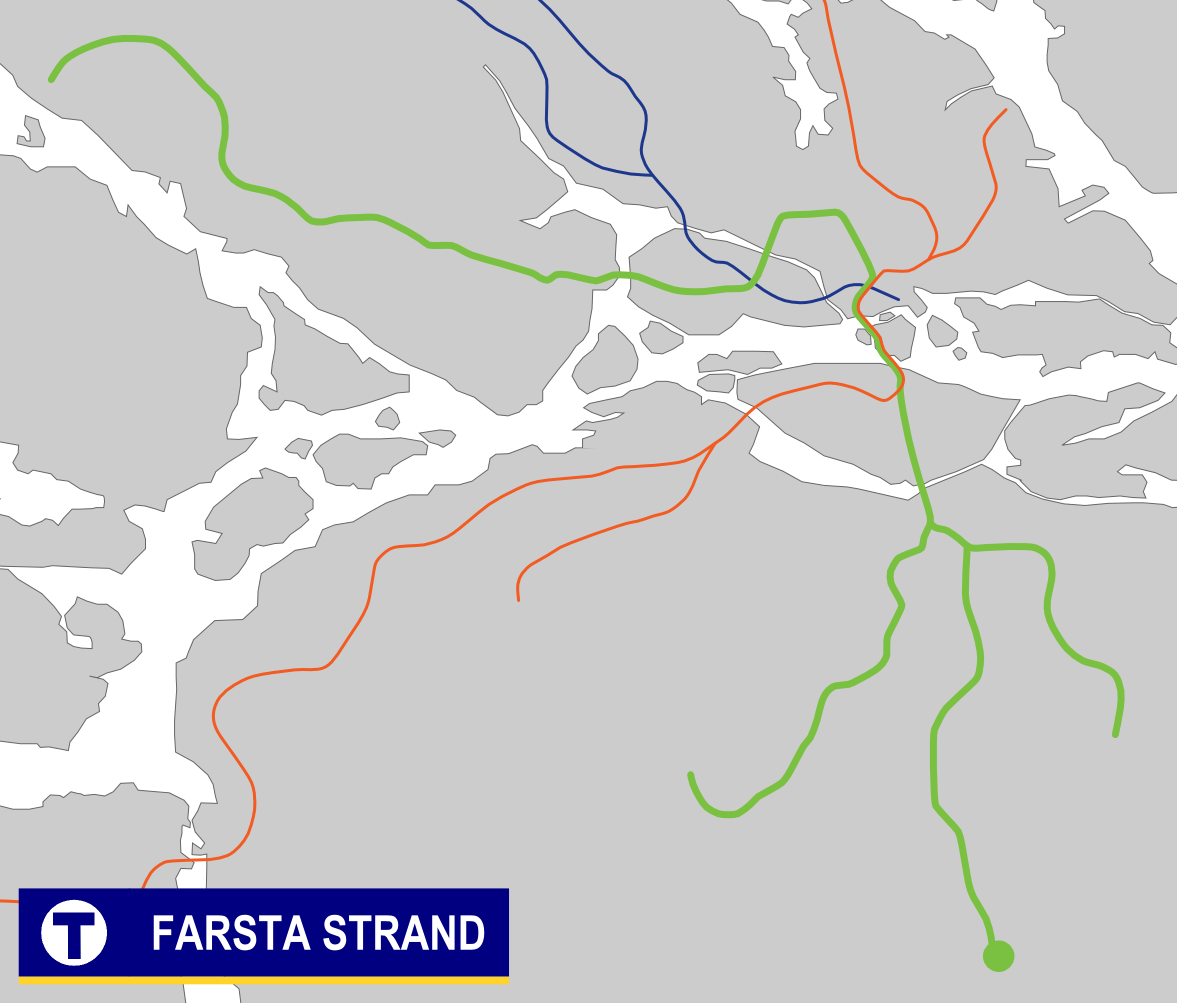

Farsta strand metro station is a station on the Green Line of the Stockholm Metro, located in Farsta strand, Söderort. It is the end station for Line 18. The station was opened on 29 August 1971 as the southern terminus of the extension from Farsta. The distance to Slussen is 10.4 km (6 mi).

The Farsta strand commuter rail station is 200 metres away.
