= Simon (French TV series) =

French television series

- Logo
- Genre: Preschool
- Created by: Stéphanie Blake
- Directed by: Julien Cayot
- Voices of: Loti Bailey; Hayden Conneti; Keith Faulkner; Rudy Greatorex; Hari Patel; Luke Halliwell; Jacob Preston; Joanna Ruiz; Mili Patel; Alex Starke
- Composer: Séverin
- Country of origin: France
- Original languages: French; English
- No. of seasons: 5
- No. of episodes: 208

Production
- Executive producers: Eric Garnet; Anne De Galard
- Running time: 5 minutes
- Production company: GO-N Productions

Original release
- Network: France 5
- Release: December 17, 2016 – present

Simon is a French animated television series based on Stéphanie Blake's books published by L'Ecole des Loisirs, directed by Julien Cayot, adapted by Thomas Forwood and Stéphanie Blake and produced by GO-N Productions with the participation of France Télévisions. The show centers on an anthropomorphic rabbit named Simon. The series premiered in France on 17 December 2016 on French channel France 5 before being exported across the world. The fifth season was launched on 19 November 2024, and is currently airing on YouTube.

== Plot ==
The series focuses on an anthropomorphic rabbit named Simon, who lives with his parents Andre and Eva and little brother Gaspard and a pet orange cat named Milou and they go on many adventures.

== Cast ==
=== French ===
- Salomé Keren Zeitoun as Simon
- Magalie Bonfils as Eva
- Mathias Casartelli as André
- Mahogany-Elfie Elis as Lou
- Angèle Humeau as Patricia
- Tony Sanial as Gaspard
- Kylian Trouillard as Ferdinand
- Charley Dethière as Ferdinand

=== English ===
- Bisneado Arlexo as Benjamin
- Alex Starke as Simon
- Loti Bailey as Lou
- Hayden Conneti as Mamadou
- Keith Faulkner as Grandpa
- Rudy Greatorex as Gaspard
- Hari Patel as Gaspard from mid season 3
- Luke Haliwell as André
- Jacob Preston as Ferdinand
- Joanna Ruiz as Eva, Patricia, Grandma

== Episodes ==
=== Season 1 (2016–17) ===
Season	N°	Title	Storyboard	Author
1	01	Super rabbit	Julien Cayot	Stéphanie Blake, Thomas Forwood, Nicolas Chrétien
1	02	No more stabilisers	Julien Cayot	Nicolas Chrétien
1	03	Tomatoes	Julien Cayot	Stéphanie Blake, Nicolas Chrétien
1	04	I don't want to go to the pool	Amanda Sun	Florence Sandis
1	05	Merry Christmas	Stéphane Beau	Florence Sandis
1	06	I don't want to go to school	Julien Cayot	Simon Lecocq
1	07	I'm the champion	Stéphane Beau	Stéphanie Blake, Nicolas Chrétien
1	08	Not the dentist	Dorothée Robert	Balthazar Chapuis
1	09	The teeny weeny incy wincy bugs	Stéphane Beau	Stéphanie Blake, Nicolas Chrétien
1	10	Loser takes it all	Stéphane Beau	Simon Lecocq
1	11	The secret	Julien Cayot	Simon Lecocq
1	12	In the aeroplane	Amanda Sun	Florence Sandis
1	13	Mr. sticky glue	Dorothée Robert	Simon Lecocq
1	14	Dad is weird today	Dorothée Robert	Simon Lecocq
1	15	Feather	Dorothée Robert	Balthazar Chapuis
1	16	Copy rabbit	Stéphane Beau	Simon Lecocq
1	17	The baby-sitter	Dorothée Robert	Matthieu Chevallier
1	18	Happy birthday Mummy	Stéphane Beau	Florence Sandis
1	19	I'm the boss	Amanda Sun	Hervé Nadler
1	20	Cats and dogs	Stéphane Beau	Simon Lecocq
1	21	Super great	Amanda Sun	Simon Lecocq
1	22	The disappearing act	Dorothée Robert	Simon Lecocq
1	23	Bing bang boom	Amanda Sun	Matthieu Chevallier
1	24	Assistant Doctor	Stéphane Beau	Yann Ropars
1	25	The big dilemma	Dorothée Robert	Balthazar Chapuis
1	26	Nits	Amanda Sun	Hervé Nadler
1	27	It's no fun being big	Dorothée Robert	Nicolas Verpilleux
1	28	I am not your friend anymore	Amanda Sun	Simon Lecocq
1	29	Sleepover at Ferdinand's	Stéphane Beau	Benjamin Le Bars
1	30	Just like Dad	Dorothée Robert	Matthieu Chevallier
1	31	I've got a dragon	Dorothée Robert	Thomas Forwood
1	32	Friends at last	Stéphane Beau	Simon Lecocq
1	33	No cheating	Dorothée Robert	Matthieu Chevallier
1	34	My big cousin	Amanda Sun	Simon Lecocq
1	35	TreeMendous	Dorothée Robert	Denis Lima
1	36	Catching crabs	Stéphane Beau	Yann Ropars
1	37	Big kids	Stéphane Beau	Simon Lecocq
1	38	But we don't want to leave	Dorothée Robert	Nicolas Verpilleux
1	39	Snowballs	Stéphane Beau	Simon Lecocq
1	40	Not sleepy	Amanda Sun	Nicolas Verpilleux
1	41	In just a little while	Paul Hervé	Simon Lecocq
1	42	The champ!	Dorothée Robert	Simon Lecocq
1	43	Who's afraid of the dark!	Julien Cayot	Nicolas Chrétien
1	44	Bye bye blankie	Amanda Sun	Nicolas Verpilleux
1	45	Going camping	Stéphane Beau	Denis Lima
1	46	Saving Kermit	Stéphane Beau	Simon Lecocq
1	47	Look out here I come	Amanda Sun	Benjamin Le Bars
1	48	Albert the hamster	Dorothée Robert	Val?rie Chappellet
1	49	A deal is a deal	Stéphane Beau	Nicolas Chrétien
1	50	Super big brother	Paul Hervé	Denis Lima
1	51	A night in the treehouse	Paul Hervé	Simon Lecocq
1	52	Mr. Mess it up	Paul Hervé	Simon Lecocq

=== Season 2 (2018–19) ===
Season	N°	Title	Storyboard	Author
2	01	Who's the Strongest?		
2	02	Holiday Time!		
2	03	I Made a Mess		
2	04	I Just Love Surprises		
2	05	Stars for Mummy		
2	06	I'm Not Afraid of the Storm		
2	07	Bath Time, Elvis!		
2	08	Let's Go to the Farm		
2	09	You Did It On Purpose, Gaspard		
2	10	Sulky Pants		
2	11	The Toy Tree		
2	12	Oh No, Not Gaspard's Friends!		
2	13	What a Swimming Lesson!		
2	14	Hiding the Blankie		
2	15	I Saw It First!		
2	16	The Sack Race		
2	17	Too Shy!		
2	18	All By Myself		
2	19	Who's the Best?		
2	20	The Fastest T-Shirt in the World		
2	21	A Trip in the Breakdown Truck		
2	22	I Want to Ride On the Tractor		
2	23	I Can't Get To Sleep		
2	24	Lou's Birthday		
2	25			
2	26	Prickly the Hedgehog		
2	27	That's Our Treasure Chest!		
2	28	There's No Such Thing As Monsters!		
2	29	Milou in the Snow		
2	30	The Yucky Blankie		
2	31	The Mega Water Slide		
2	32	The School Trip		
2	33	The Snowball Fight		
2	34	I Know How to Sail		
2	35	The Forest Fairies		
2	36	A Trio of Superheroes!		
2	37	Super Rabbit Day		
2	38	The Lost Blankie		
2	39	We're All Superheroes!		
2	40	Hey... That's Not Fair!		
2	41	We're All Just Little Babies		
2	42	Easy Peasy Rackets		
2	43	Let's Play Tag!		
2	44	Super Ref!		
2	45	Roller Skating Rules		
2	46	Lost in the Snow		
2	47	We Are the Champions!		
2	48	I Don't Want To Go On Stage		
2	49	What a Monster!		
2	50	The Supersonic Canoe		
2	51	The Train Trip		
2	52	We Are Not Liars		

=== Season 3 (2020–21) ===
Season	N°	Title	Storyboard	Author
3	01	Hop On Your Bike		
3	02	I Can Do It!		
3	03	Mummy's Treasure		
3	04	Firemen for a Day		
3	05	Nightmare, Go Away!		
3	06	I'll Take Care of It		
3	07	Daddy's Not Afraid of Anything		
3	08	I Really Need to Pee		
3	09	We're Going to School		
3	10	Happy Birthday Ferdinand!		
3	11	Grandpa Charles		
3	12	You're a Tell Tale		
3	13	Oh No, Not the Hospital!		
3	14	Drop the Frisbee, Elvis!		
3	15	Ferdinand's Fire Engine		
3	16	Quick, Quick, It's the Fireworks!		
3	17	First One to Laugh is the Loser		
3	18	Saving Super Spider!		
3	19	The Beach Club		
3	20	Super Lou is Super Amazing!		
3	21	The Little Cat		
3	22	It Wasn't Me		
3	23	Super Duper Mega Banana Soup		
3	24	It's Not a Joke!		
3	25	Can We Borrow It Please Please?		
3	26	Shopping at the Farm		
3	27	Super Animals		
3	28	Super Rabbit's Disappeared!		
3	29	The Big Animal Parade		
3	30	The Lightning Fast Car		
3	31	Daddy's Birthday		
3	32	The Super Duper Spinning Top		
3	33	We're Having Too Much Fun		
3	34	It's My Birthday!		
3	35	The Frog Song		
3	36	Milou at the Vet's		
3	37	Come Back Rainbow!		
3	38	You're Such a Superhero		
3	39	My New Best Friend		
3	40	Polly the Parrot		
3	41	I Don't Want to be the Monster		
3	42	The Mountain Cabin		
3	43	Ferdinand's Teddy Bear		
3	44	A Night at the Hotel		
3	45	These are My New Friends		
3	46	My Mummy's the Best!		
3	47	It's Not Yours!		
3	48	Super Mission!		
3	49	It's Nearly Christmas		
3	50	I'll Be Right Back		
3	51	The Swimming Medal		
3	52	The Super Duper New Game		

=== Season 4: Simon Super Rabbit (2022–23) ===
Season	N°	Title	Storyboard	Author
4	01	Trapped by the Wolf!		
4	02	Sweet Thief		
4	03	Beach Rescue		
4	04	Watch Out - Robot Mozzies About!		
4	05	The Spaghetti Tree		
4	06	The Battle of Super Heroes		
4	07	The Lost Treasure		
4	08	It's Not Sleep Time		
4	09	The Monster in the Bath		
4	10	Leave the Cat Alone		
4	11	What is That Noise?		
4	12	Our Secret Base is in Danger		
4	13	The Sleeping Monster		
4	14	Super Duper Apple Sauce		
4	15	The Ant Colony		
4	16	The New Superhero		
4	17	Plasticine Rescue!		
4	18	Professor Wolf's Submarine		
4	19	A Mission for Super Elvis!		
4	20	Professor Wolf's Game		
4	21	Bring on the Mega Spaceships!		
4	22	Super Elvis the Hero Dog		
4	23	It's Freezing Cold		
4	24	The Mega Strawberry Share Out		
4	25	Superhero Football		
4	26	Mission Anti-Lice!		
4	27	The Runway Hen		
4	28	We Are a Super Team!		
4	29	Operation Name, Find the Missing Key!		
4	30	Snail Slime Ferdinand		
4	31	Watch Out, Jellyfish About!		
4	32	Best Friends		
4	33	Frogs in Danger		
4	34	Operation Super Big		
4	35	Lightning Strikes, Be Careful!		
4	36	Professor Wolf's Bird		
4	37	The Dragon's Hat		
4	38	Operation Learning to Fly		
4	39	Operation Crab		
4	40	Photo Danger		
4	41	Pulling Faces		
4	42	A Super Cake for Super Heroes		
4	43	The Megarobot Who Knows It All		
4	44	On the Hunt for Mega Snails		

=== Season 5: Simon Super Rabbit (2024–) ===
Season	N°	Title	Storyboard	Author
5	01	You're Going to Break It		
5	02	We're Not Scared of the Dark		
5	03	Grandma Wolf's Snacktime		
5	04	Stop Snoring!		
5	05	The Bumpety Bumpety Bump Dance		
5	06	The Best of Presents		
5	07	Grandma Wolf's Top Advice		
5	08	Super Elvis Always Does What He Wants		
