= Never Violence! =

1978 speech by Astrid Lindgren

Never Violence! or Never Violence (original title: Niemals Gewalt! or Niemals Gewalt) is a speech made by Astrid Lindgren in 1978, when she received the peace prize Friedenspreis des Deutschen Buchhandels (in English: Peace Prize of the German Book Trade). It is one of the most well-known and influential speeches by Lindgren. Astrid Lindgren speaks against corporal punishment of children. A year later, in Lindgren's home country Sweden, a law was passed that forbid corporal punishment of children. In 1978, the speech was first published as a book under the German title Astrid Lindgren: Ansprachen anlässlich der Verleihung des Friedenspreises des Deutschen Buchhandels (Friedenspreis des Deutschen Buchhandels). Later the book was also published in many different languages. In 2009, a German short film called Never Violence (original title: Niemals Gewalt) had been published at Children's Day and was based on the story mentioned in Lindgren's speech.

== Speech ==
On 22 October 1978, Astrid Lindgren made an acceptance speech while she received the Peace Prize of the German Book Trade (Friedenspreis des Deutschen Buchhandels). In her speech at the Frankfurter Paulskirche she supported non-violent upbringing. During that time in Germany there was still a law for the parental right of corporal punishment.

=== Content ===
Astrid Lindgren begins by saying that as long as man has lingered on this Earth, there has been violence and war. True peace, on the other hand, does not exist on Earth. Politicians talk about disarmament, but not about their own, instead about those of other countries.

Astrid Lindgren asks why so many people seek power or revenge and want violence. She does not believe that these people are evil by nature. Therefore, she wonders how people can learn to oppose violence. She thinks that people have to start with the children. She believes that most dictators have experienced violence, humiliation, insults, and exposures, and pass on this behaviour. Those to whom the children are entrusted decide whether they give them love or violence, which those children later pass on. She explains that free and unauthorized education does not mean that children should be allowed to do whatever they want, and that behavioural norms and rules must also be applied to in this form of education. A loving respect for each other is something she wishes for both, children and parents.

Then Lindgren tells a story she has heard from an old lady. When the lady was a young mother, her son had done something that, in her opinion, required severe punishment. She asked the boy to pick up a stick and bring it to her. It took a long time until the boy came back with a stone. He was crying. When he explained that he had not found a stick, but she could throw the stone after him, the mother realized what the boy must have felt. He must have thought she just wanted to hurt him, and she could also do that with a stone. She cried and hugged the child. Later, she put the stone onto a shelf. It should serve her as a warning never to use violence.

Astrid Lindgren believes children would notice the atrocities, violence and oppressions that exist around the world. Therefore, it is important to show them that things can be different. Maybe everyone should put a stone on the kitchen shelf as a warning never to use any violence. It could serve peace in the world.

=== Background ===
When receiving the Peace Prize of the German Book Trade, on 22 October 1978, Astrid Lindgren wanted to make a speech about non-violent upbringing. At that time parental violence was still considered normal in Germany. Astrid Lindgren had to submit the speech to the committee in advance. She was advised only to accept the prize, without making any speech. The organizer found the speech was too provocative. Astrid Lindgren insisted on keeping her speech as it was, otherwise she wouldn't have come.

=== Impacts of the speech ===
Lindgren's speech was soon spread worldwide. In her home country Sweden, Astrid Lindgren teamed up with scientists, journalists and politicians to achieve non-violent upbringing. In 1979, due to Astrid Lindgren's speech, a law was introduced in Sweden prohibiting violence against children. Until then there was no such law anywhere in the world. After Sweden, other Nordic countries followed Lindgren's role model. According to article 1631 II of the Bürgerliches Gesetzbuch, children in Germany only have held the "right to a non-violent upbringing" since 2000. Nevertheless, Lindgren's speech also made people think. Because of her speech more scientists were interested in exploring the consequences of violence on children. They could later confirm Lindgren's theses. According to criminologist Christian Pfeiffer, this made people change their opinions about that matter and ultimately led to the change of the law in 2000. After Sweden many other countries around the world have made laws that forbid violence against children. Nepal is now the 54th state that forbids violence against children. As of 2019 Sweden still is working on a program called Never Violence, a programme to strengthen international efforts to legislate against corporal punishment of children at home and school.

== Book ==
Never Violence (original title: Niemals Gewalt!) is the title of a book about Astrid Lindgren's famous speech.

=== Content ===
The book contains the complete speech. In addition, a foreword, as well as an epilogue and a timeline about the life of Astrid Lindgren were added. Furthermore, Lindgren's poem If I were God was published in the book.

=== Background ===
The speech was first published in a book in 1978 in Germany and in Sweden. Since then the speech has been published many times. The speech in the different editions always stayed the same, but the text accompanying the book changed. In Sweden, a new edition book was published in 2018. It was titled Aldrig våld! and contained Lindgren's entire speech. The introduction, however, was made by Marta Santos Pais, a Portuguese lawyer who has been serving as the Special Representative of the United Nations Secretary-General on Violence against Children. The epilogue was written by Thomas Hammarberg, a former Commissioner for Human Rights in the Council of Europe in Strasbourg. The cover was illustrated by Stina Wirsén. This Swedish edition has been translated into English along with the preface and epilogue, as well as Stina Wirsén's cover illustration.

=== Reception ===
Esma from Was liest du? wrote that Niemals Gewalt! is a "small and thin book", yet it is "so full of content". She wished that everyone would read it and most importantly live by it.

Stephanie Müller said that it is frightening to see how well Lindgren's speech still fits in our time today. She believed that this should be read and internalized by people over and over again.

Stephanie Streif of the Badische Zeitung wrote that the little book is dedicated to "a very big, important topic": "children's rights".

Luette Lotte found that at first the book seems inconspicuous and small, but its content is deeply moving and makes people think.

=== Editions ===
- Astrid Lindgren (2014): ποτέ βία! (Pote via!, Modern Greek). Tankobon Hardcover. ISBN 9786188119314
- Astrid Lindgren (2015): 暴力は絶対だめ! (Boryoku wa zettai dame) (Japanese). Tankobon Hardcover. ISBN 9784000247894
- Astrid Lindgren (2017): Niemals Gewalt! (German). Friedrich Oetinger Verlag. ISBN 9785001140450
- Astrid Lindgren (2018): Aldrig våld! (Swedish). Astrid Lindgren Text. ISBN 9789187659133
- Astrid Lindgren (2018): Never violence! (English). Astrid Lindgren Text. ISBN 9789177737001
- Astrid Lindgren (2019): Mai violenza! (Italian). Salani. ISBN 9788893817912
- Astrid Lindgren (2019): Net nasiliju! (Russian). Belaja vorona. ISBN 9785001140450
- Astrid Lindgren (2020): Żadnej przemocy! (Polish). Zakamarki. ISBN 9788377761977
- Astrid Lindgren (2021): 폭력에 반대합니다 (Korean). Hugobooks. ISBN 9791186602621
- Astrid Lindgren (2021): ¡Violencia, jamás! (Spanish). Kókinos. ISBN 9788417742454

== Short film ==
Never Violence
- Niemals Gewalt
- Directed by: David Aufdembrinke
- Written by: David Aufdembrinke; Astrid Lindgren (story)
- Based on: Never violence speech
- Produced by: DAGO Kinderlobby e.V. David Aufdembrinke
- Starring: Noémi Besedes: Mother; Justus Herold: Boy; Angelika Thomas: Neighbor
- Cinematography: Lilli Thalgott
- Music by: Oliver Heuss
- Release date: 2009
- Running time: 6 minutes
- Country: Germany
- Language: German

Never Violence (original title: Niemals Gewalt) is a short film by David Aufdembrinke. It is based on the story told by Astrid Lindgren during her speech.

=== Plot ===
A boy watches his neighbor baking a strawberry cake. He steals the strawberry cake and eats it, but he is discovered by the neighbour. She brings him to his mother and tells her to punish her son. The mother tells her son to go outside and get a stick. When it gets dark, the boy is still not back. The mother runs into the forest and calls for him, but her son does not answer. Then she runs to the phone. Just when she wants to make a call, her son comes back and says that he is sorry. The mother explains that the most important thing is that he is back. The boy tells his mother he could not find a stick. Instead, he gives her a big stone. He adds that she could hurt him with that too. The mother looks at him in horror, puts the stone aside and hugs her boy. The stone is placed on the windowsill and the words "Never Violence" appear.

=== Background ===
The film crew needed more than a year to develop the film. Later the film was made with a budget of 3,000 euros, within three days in Steinberg-Haff und Emkendorf in Schleswig-Holstein. At first it was considered to relocate history to the present day. The mother should have been a single parent and should have come from a precarious situation, but that would have let into many viewers seeing violence as a problem of others. Instead, the film crew wanted to portray violence from a child's point of view. Director David Aufdembrinke explained that it is a child who does everything to gain his mother's love. He added that it was important for him to demonstrate that children who experience violence perceive it as something completely normal and pass it on to others. If violence is a strange thing for them, one can hope for a peaceful future. The film was released on the International Children's Day on 20 September 2009 by the DAGO Kinderlobby (DAGO Children's Lobby) in cooperation with the Deutsche Liga für das Kind (German League for the Child in Family and Society). These two organizations work for the rights of young people. It was the first film role for the main actor Justus Herold. In 2010, the film was shown at the Sardinia Film Festival in Sardinia. The Stiftung Kinderschutz Schweiz (Swiss Foundation for Child Protection) showed the film on their website during the international No Hitting Day.

=== Reception ===
Sandra Schäfer of the Berliner Morgenpost said that the story would be timeless through the choice of images and the rural environment. In addition, the film would strongly remind the viewer of the world of Astrid Lindgren's characters.

Franziska Falkenberg from Hamburger Abendblatt praised cinematographer Lilli Thalgot, who captures "the child's perspective in an impressive way". Her pictures speak for themselves and touch "the viewer in harmony with Oliver Heuss' music deeply".

Sophie Lüttich from Berlinfreckles.de explained that the film moved her deeply and made her think.

The short film received the Main Taunus Award at the Shorts at Moonlight Filmfestival 2010.
