= Hydroscand =

- Industry: Industrial distribution
- Founded: 1969
- Founder: Björn Holmström
- Headquarters: Stockholm, Sweden
- Number of locations: 230 branches
- Area served: 19 countries
- Key people: Frida Norrbom Sams (CEO)
- Products: Hydraulic and industrial hoses, fittings and couplings, hose assemblies
- Services: Hose maintenance, hose replacement, mobile hose service
- Number of employees: 1,700
- Website: hydroscand.com

Hydroscand is a Swedish family-owned company that specializes in hydraulic and industrial hose solutions, including hoses, fittings and related products and services. The company was founded in Stockholm in 1969 by entrepreneur Björn Holmström.

Hydroscand operates through a network of branches and mobile service units in 19 countries and serves customers in industrial sectors such as construction, forestry, agriculture, manufacturing, energy and transport. The company supplies hose assemblies, technical support and maintenance services for hydraulic and industrial hose systems.

The company employs more than 1,700 people and operates more than 230 branches. Hydroscand’s headquarters are located in Stockholm, Sweden.

== History ==
Hydroscand was founded in Stockholm, Sweden, on 17 September 1969 by entrepreneur Björn Holmström together with colleague Ivan Andersson. The company began operations in a basement in the Örby district of Stockholm under the name Hydraulikbolaget Hydroscan. Holmström had previously worked as a hose salesman and decided to start his own business after his former employer faced financial difficulties.

During its early years, the company supplied hoses and related components to industrial customers. As demand increased, the original premises in Örby became too small and the company moved to larger facilities in Högdalen in southern Stockholm. The first branch outside Stockholm was later established in Linköping.

Throughout the 1970s and 1980s, Hydroscand expanded its network of branches across Sweden, establishing operations in several cities including Västerås, Jönköping, Norrköping, Karlstad, Boden, Örebro, Ljungby and Hudiksvall. During this period the company also established Hydroscand Machine AB.

Hydroscand began expanding internationally in 1978 when it took over Europower’s agency operations in Norway, forming the basis for Hydroscand Norge. The company later established operations in Finland in 1997.

During the 2000s and 2010s the group continued its international expansion with new operations in countries including Estonia, Denmark, the United Kingdom and Latvia, followed by further establishments in markets such as France, Ireland, Romania, South Africa and Iceland. By the early 21st century Hydroscand operated in more than 20 countries.

== Operations ==
Hydroscand provides hydraulic and industrial hose solutions through a network of local branches and mobile service units. The company operates more than 230 branches in 19 countries, supplying hose assemblies, fittings and related components as well as technical support to industrial customers.

The branch network provides access to products, hose assembly services and technical expertise.

Hydroscand also operates a mobile hose service known as HoseExpress, which provides on-site hose replacement, troubleshooting and preventive maintenance at customer locations.

The company serves customers in sectors such as construction, forestry, agriculture, manufacturing, energy, transport and process industries.

Hydroscand’s operations are organised through a decentralized structure combining local branches with group-wide support functions.
