= Can You Whistle, Johanna? =

1992 book by Ulf Stark

- Author: Ulf Stark
- Original title: Kan du vissla Johanna?
- Illustrator: Anna Höglund
- Language: Swedish
- Series: Mimmi
- Genre: children
- Published: 1992
- Publisher: Bonnier Junior
- Publication place: Sweden

Can You Whistle, Johanna? (Swedish: Kan du vissla Johanna?) is a 1992 Ulf Stark children's book, which was also made into a film in 1994. It was nominated for the August Prize in 1992 and was awarded with Heffaklumpen and Deutscher Jugendliteraturpreis.

It has also been translated into English by Gecko Press.

== Plot ==
Two friends, Ulf and Berra, find a grandfather for Berra named Nils. Ulf, Berra, and Nils go on multiple adventures and soon become inseparable. One day, Berra hears Nils whistling a Swedish tune: Can You Whistle, Johanna? It becomes Berra's mission to learn to whistle and show his "grandfather". This is a story about family, growth, memories, and grief for readers of all ages.
