= Min syster är en ängel =

- Author: Ulf Stark
- Illustrator: Anna Höglund
- Cover artist: Anna Höglund
- Language: Swedish
- Genre: children
- Set in: Stureby, Sweden
- Published: 1996
- Publisher: Alfabeta
- Publication place: Sweden

Min syster är en ängel (lit. My Sister Is an Angel) is a 1996 children's book by Ulf Stark. It won the 1996 August Prize in the "best children and youth book" category.

== Plot ==
Ulf's sister died before she was born, and now she's an angel.
