= If I were God =

Poem by Astrid Lindgren

- Short story by Astrid Lindgren
- Original title: Vore jag Gud
- Language: Swedish
- Genre: Poetry

Publication
- Published in: Never Violence!
- Publication type: Poem
- Publication place: Sweden
- Media type: Print

If I were God (original title: Vore jag Gud or Om jag vore gud) is a poem written by Astrid Lindgren.

== Synopsis ==
In the poem, Astrid Lindgren writes that if she were God, she would weep over the human beings, about their cruelty, despair, fear, torment, etc. In particular, she would weep for the children, since she never wanted things to be for them like they are now. She would cry floods of tears in which all her poor humans could drown, because then it would finally be quiet.

== Background ==
Years after the poem was published, Astrid Lindgren wrote down her thoughts and feelings about the poem. She said that when she thought about the fate of humans, especially children, she often felt helpless. The injustices, pollution, destruction, etc. made her sad. When she heard about the bad things that humans were doing, it was difficult for her to believe in the good in them. It frightened her when she thought about what the children of the world were enduring. The people who are responsible for making the children suffer so much were certainly not an "image of God". She also described the tragic fate of refugee children in Sweden who were exposed to the hatred of the population and were not wanted in Sweden. They were deported back to their home countries with their families, even though they were only looking for a safe home. Astrid Lindgren would like to help all unhappy children, she explained. She often dreamed of taking care of such a child and giving this child a home. Lindgren repeatedly campaigned for refugee children, at that time mostly from the former Yugoslavia. Among other things, she wrote to politicians such as Mikhail Gorbachev and campaigned for peace in war countries or contributed the foreword to the book Jag drömmer om Fred (1994), published by UNICEF, in which painted pictures of refugee children were published.

In addition to If I were God, Astrid Lindgren wrote other poems. A lot of other works, originally written as poems, were rewritten and used as songs in the Astrid Lindgren films, while others were part of her stories and tales.

In 1975 the poem was written and was later published many times in countries like Sweden and Germany. It was translated into English in 2018 and published in the book Never Violence!. The poem was translated by Kerstin and Roger Tanner. Stina Wirsén made the illustrations next to the poem. Ilon Wikland had previously illustrated some publications of the poem in Sweden and Germany.

Dutch composer Patrick van Deurzen composed a song to Astrid Lindgren's English text and was made for a mixed choir, viola and violoncello.

After Lindgren got a stroke in 1998, she asked her daughter and Kerstin Kvint to read literature to her. Among her requested works was also her own poem If I were God.

== Analysis ==
According to Christine Nöstlinger the poem shows how much Lindgren suffered from the horrible state of the world.

Margareta Strömstedt said that the despair about the state of the world sometimes made Astrid Lindgren lose hope and cost her sleepless nights. It seemed as if she wanted to erase everything that was imperfect and unsuccessful and to make a new start. These types of thoughts would be expressed in the poem.

Katarina Alexandersson particularly perceived the author's feelings of helplessness in the face of grief, pain or evil in the poem.

Sybil Gräfin Schönfeldt added that the poem reflects the melancholy of Astrid Lindgren in her later years. The poem is foreshadowing the 21st century.

Birgit Dankert wrote that the poem proves that both Astrid Lindgren's childhood and her melancholy can be seen as the part where her creativity comes from. The poem represents that God's creation developed into the negative or even failed. Therefore, the floods of tears would act like an apocalyptic deluge. The poem also shows Astrid Lindgren's doubt and search for God. Next to doubting God, Astrid Lindgren would also desperately search for him. Lindgren explained that the adult in her knew that God or paradise did not exist, while at the same time the child in her would not accept this knowledge. In addition, she would often thank God or if she would desperately pray to him while also denying him.

According to Diersch, Jahn and Schaak next to the evil deeds of human beings also the good characteristics of humans were mentioned, but these deeds seem pitiful and unable to outweigh the horrors done by humans. The evil of human action dominates. The suffering in the world finally becomes immeasurable when the author thinks about the children and their suffering caused by adults. Lindgren writes that the humans "could drown" and not "must drown". The tears are cried so that people can recognize, change, stop their gruesome actions and turn back. People could feel love if they wanted to see. Astrid Lindgren's poem is a poem of comfort and care. The author ends the text humorously. The last line reads: "so there finally would be quiet". Lindgren is tired of the humans' evil deeds, so she wants peace. The word "quiet" refers to the end of senseless noise. It does not refer to death. The poem says nothing about silence or peace. There are more important things than war, bullying, torturing, injuring, and arguing. It is a sad laugh, a sad grief that comes to the reader from the poem. Astrid Lindgren was an exceptional humanist.

== Reception ==
The poem has been part of several sermons.

According to Manuela Schlecht the poem sends shivers down the reader's spine. Fred Rautenberg added that the poem sounds infinitely dark and almost desperate.

== English edition ==
- Astrid Lindgren: If I were god. In: Astrid Lindgren (2018): Never Violence! (English). Astrid Lindgren Text. P.42–45
