= Van Deurzen =

Van Deurzen is a Dutch surname. Notable people with the surname include:

- Emmy van Deurzen (born 1951), Dutch therapist
- Patrick van Deurzen (born 1964), Dutch composer

== See also ==
- Vandeurzen
