= Anna Höglund =

Swedish writer and illustrator

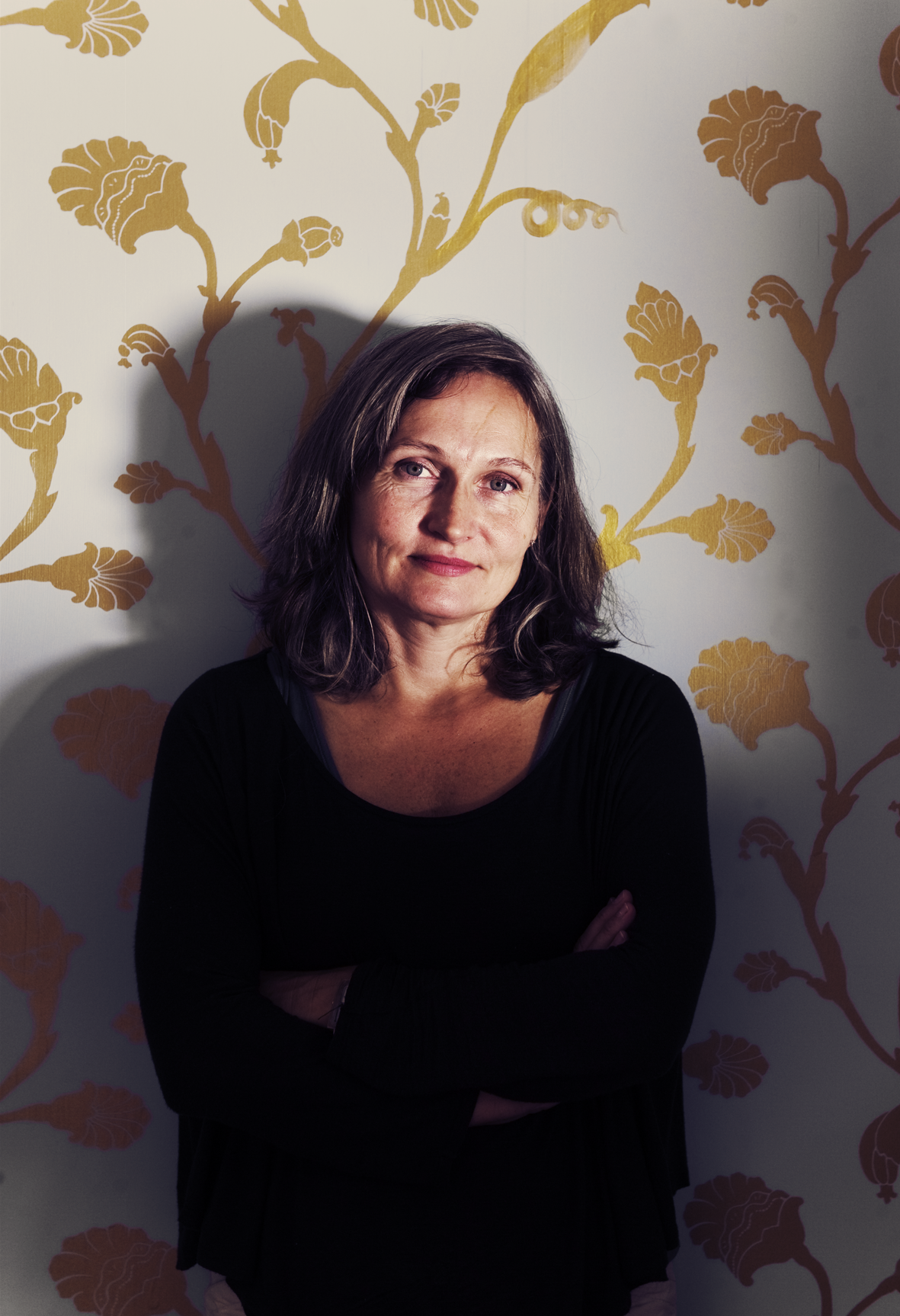
- Born: 14 May 1958 (age 68); Stockholm, Sweden
- Writing career
- Genre: children's books

Anna Höglund (born 14 May 1958) is a Swedish writer and illustrator, considered to be one of Sweden's best illustrators.

== Life and career ==
She was born in Stockholm and has no formal art training. Her first book was Sagan om Pannkakan ("The pancake story"), published in 1982. She has also written plays and made animated films. Sagan om Pannkakan was made into an animated film in 1992.

Her work is included in the collections of the Gothenburg Museum of Art and the Nationalmuseum in Stockholm.

== Selected works ==
- Kan du vissla Johanna? (in English Can You Whistle, Johanna? from Gecko Press) text by Ulf Stark (1992)
- Resor jag aldrig har gjort ("Journeys I have never made") (1992)
- Mina och Kåge (1995)
- Min syster är en ängel ("My Sister is an Angel") text by Ulf Stark (1996)
- Om detta talar man endast med kaniner ("This is something that you only talk about with rabbits") (2013)
- Förvandlingen (in English The Stone Giant from Gecko Press) (2018)

== Awards ==
- Zilveren Penseel award for Kan du vissla Johanna? in 1994
- Deutscher Jugendliteraturpreis for Kan du vissla Johanna? in 1995
- Deutscher Jugendliteraturpreis for Resor jag aldrig har gjort in 1996
- August Prize for Min syster är en ängel in 1996
- Pier Paolo Vergerio European Prize for children's literature for Mina och Kåge in 1998
- Nils Holgersson Plaque for Om detta talar man endast med kaniner in 2014
