= Lubo (film) =

2023 film by Giorgio Diritti

- Theatrical release poster
- Directed by: Giorgio Diritti
- Screenplay by: Giorgio Diritti; Fredo Valla
- Based on: Il seminatore by Mario Cavatore
- Produced by: Fabrizio Donvito; Benedetto Habib; Daniel Campos Pavoncelli; Marco Cohen; Giorgio Diritti; Francesca Scorzoni; Christof Neracher; Claudio Falconi; Alberto Fusco; Andrea Masera
- Starring: Franz Rogowski; Christophe Sermet; Valentina Bellè; Noémi Besedes; Cecilia Steiner; Joel Basman
- Cinematography: Benjamin Maier
- Edited by: Paolo Cottignola; Giorgio Diritti
- Music by: Marco Biscarini
- Production companies: Indiana Production; Aranciafilm; Rai Cinema; Hugofilm Features; Proxima Milano; RSI Radiotelevisione Svizzera / SRG/SSR
- Distributed by: 01 Distribution
- Release dates: 7 September 2023 (Venice); 9 November 2023 (Italy)
- Running time: 181 minutes
- Countries: Italy; Switzerland
- Languages: Italian; Swiss German; Yenish
- Box office: $121,706

Lubo is a 2023 drama film directed by Giorgio Diritti. The screenplay was written by Diritti and Fredo Valla, based on an idea by Giorgio Diritti, Fredo Valla and Tania Pedroni. It is based on Mario Cavatore's 2004 novel Il seminatore. It is an Italian and Swiss co-production.

The film was selected to compete for the Golden Lion at the 80th Venice International Film Festival, where it premiered on 7 September 2023. It was released in Italy on 9 November 2023.

== Plot ==
In 1939, Lubo Moser, a nomadic street artist of Yenish descent, is called up for military service in the Swiss army to protect the border. He learns from his cousin that the police have taken his children as part of the Kinder der Landstrasse ("Children of the Road"), a national re-education programme influenced by the principles of eugenics. Lubo searches for his children relentlessly and sets about taking revenge in his own way.

== Cast ==
- Franz Rogowski as Lubo Moser
- Christophe Sermet as Motti
- Valentina Bellè as Margherita
- Noémi Besedes as Elsa
- Cecilia Steiner as Klara
- Joel Basman as Bruno Reiter
- Filippo Giulini as Antonio
- Alessandro Zappella

== Production ==
Lubo was produced by Indiana Production, Aranciafilm, Rai Cinema, Hugofilm Features and Proxima Milano, in co-production with RSI Radiotelevisione Svizzera SRG/SSR, and with the support of the Direzione Generale Cinema e Audiovisivo MiC, Swiss Federal Office of Culture, Zürcher Filmstiftung, IDM Film Commission Alto Adige, Film Commission Torino Piemonte, and Trentino Film Commission.

The film was shot over the course of nine weeks in Piedmont, South Tyrol, the Autonomous Province of Trento, and Switzerland.

== Release ==
Lubo was selected to compete for the Golden Lion at the 80th Venice International Film Festival, where it had its world premiere on 7 September 2023. It was released in Italy on 9 November 2023 by 01 Distribution.

== Reception ==
=== Critical response ===
On the review aggregator website Rotten Tomatoes, the film holds an approval rating of 50% based on 8 reviews, with an average rating of 6.3/10.

=== Accolades ===
| Award | Date of ceremony | Category | Recipient(s) | Result | Ref. |
|---|---|---|---|---|---|
| Nastro d'Argento | 27 June 2024 | Best Costume Design | Ursula Patzak | Nominated | |
| Nastro d'Argento | 27 June 2024 | Best Supporting Actress | Valentina Bellè | Nominated | |
| Venice Film Festival | 9 September 2023 | Golden Lion | Giorgio Diritti | Nominated | |
