= Vandeurzen =

Vandeurzen is a surname. Notable people with the surname include:

- Jo Vandeurzen (born 1958), Belgian politician
- Jurgen Vandeurzen (born 1974), Belgian footballer

== See also ==
- Van Deurzen
