= Örby =

Urban district in Stockholm, Sweden

Coordinates: 59°16′36.4″N 18°1′47.12″E

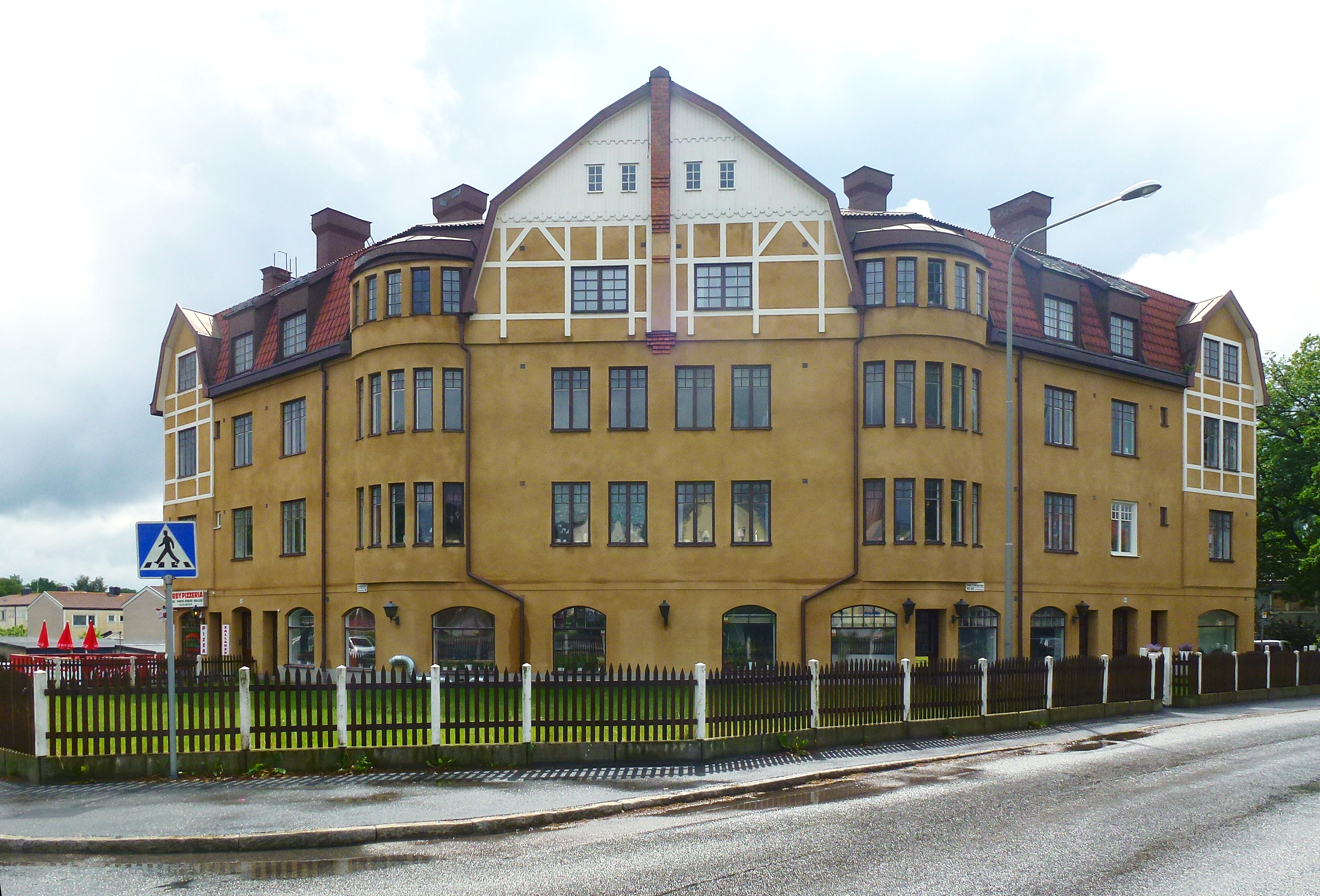
Leipzighuset

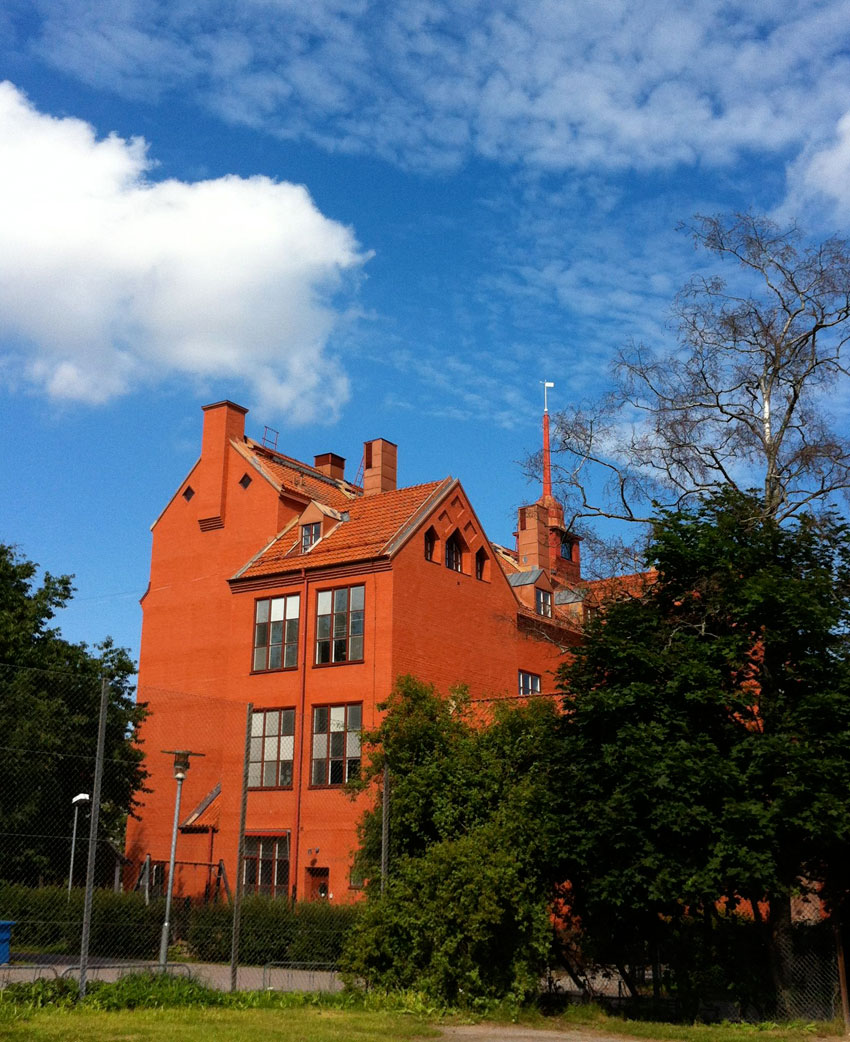
Örbyskolan

Örby is a residential area in Söderort, Stockholm Municipality, Sweden. It covers an area of 159 hectares and is home to 4,720 residents.

== History ==
Örby got its name from the Örby Manor (Örby slott), as does the neighbouring residential area of Örby slott. Örby was created a self-governing village within Brännkyrka Rural District in 1904. The area was amalgamated with Stockholm City in 1913 and the rural district was dissolved. In the present administration of the city, it is part of the borough of Enskede-Årsta-Vantör.

== Notable buildings ==
Leipzighuset is a multi-dwelling apartment house located at the corner of Turingevägen / Gamla Huddingevägen in Örby. Built in the early 1900s, the architecture differs from other buildings in Örby and was inspired by German metropolitan architecture from the turn of the 1900s.

Örbyskolan was built in 1915 and designed by architect Georg A. Nilsson (1871-1949). The building looks like similar schools in Gamla Enskede and Långbro and is sometimes mistaken for a church due to its size and shape.

== Communications ==
Örby was served by trams between 1930 and 1951 (Line 19, at the time called Örbybanan), but now has bus connections with the Stockholm Metro at the stations in Bandhagen, Svedmyra and Högdalen as well as the Stockholm commuter rail station at Älvsjö.

== Sports ==
The sports club Örby IS was founded in 1912 and is still active, with association football, floorball and ice hockey.

== See also ==
- Gamla Östberga
- Hagsätra
- Stureby
- Älvsjö
