= Stina Wirsén =

Swedish author and illustrator (born 1968)

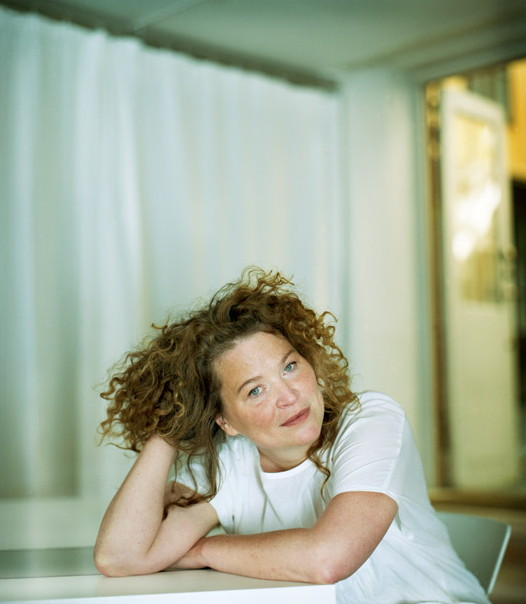
Stina Wirsén (2017) photo by Ulrika Zwenger

Stina Wirsén Hedengren (born 1968) is a Swedish author and illustrator.

== Early life and education ==
Stina Wirsén was born in 1968 in Älvsjö, Stockholm, Sweden to Carin and Christian Wirsén. She started making art in early childhood.

She attended at Konstfack in Stockholm from 1985 to 1992.

== Career ==
Wirsén was the in-house illustrator at Dagens Nyheter between 1990 and 2010. She was the head of the paper’s illustration department for several years. After 2010 she began working as a freelance illustrator and author. She has received several awards for her illustrations. Wirsén's illustrations often switch between different genres. That also applies to her children's books. She writes children's ABC-books, as well as anthologies, text, and picture books. She is a member of the Swedish Children's Book Academy.

The book Little Pink and the Motley Crew (Swedish: En liten skär och alla bråkiga brokiga) (2014) was controversial for Wirsén's illustrated depictions of the Black girl character named Lilla Hjärtat (English: Little Heart), who has resemblance to an American derogatory caricature of a "pickaninny" or "golliwog" and who was supposed to have acted "uncontrollable". The backlash of claims of racism started on social media, and was later picked up by the Swedish news. Wirsén announced in the news in November 2012, she would discontinue the Lilla Hjärtat character.

== Private life ==
Wirsén is married to Swedish graphic designer and art director Pompe Hedengren. They have three children.

== Selected assignments ==
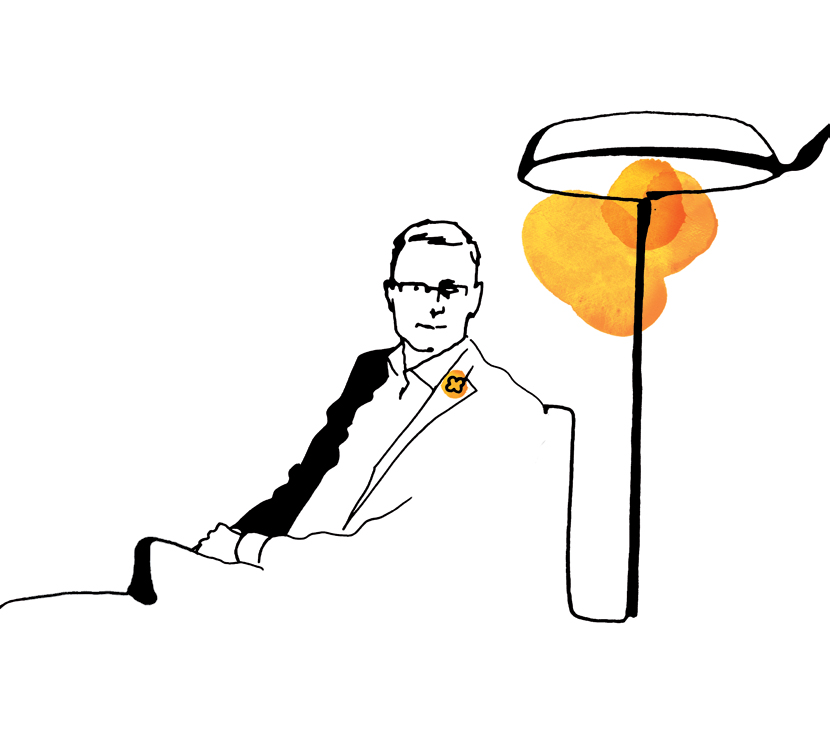
Sample illustration by Stina Wirsén, part of "Vision Kulturmiljö 2030"

- Since 2000 Stina Wirsén has delivered lectures and workshops internationally. Her focus is on children between the ages of 2–6 years. She has been working with children and pictures/images in Abu Dhabi, Tokyo, Bologna, Umeå and Stockholm.
- Åhléns City – A 25-meter wide, hand drawn, fashion illustration for the beauty section at the department store in central Stockholm. The illustration was drawn straight on to the Swedish handmade tiles at the tile factory in Askersund.
- Stamps for the Swedish Post Office – A series of 8 stamps picturing creations by different Swedish fashion designers.
- UN Human Rights – A series of graphic illustrations of UN's Human Rights applied on 14 miljon copies of the Swedish telephone directory. The series was exhibited at the UN headquarters in New York during the 50-year anniversary of the Human Rights declaration.
- Save the Children, Sweden – both non-profit and commissioned work, e.g. illustrations to articles in their quarterly magazine BARN (CHILDREN).
- Google "doodle" illustration on the theme diversity published/applied on Google first page worldwide on the Swedish National Day 2015.

== Selected exhibitions ==
- Sven-Harrys konstmuseum 2014 – Around the turn of this millennium there was an explosive progress on the Swedish fashion scene. The exhibition "Svenskt Mode: 2000 – 2015” at Sven-Harrys Konstmuseum in Stockholm depicts the fast, esthetic and conceptual change during this eventful period of time with a big collection of key garments from Swedish fashion designers and fashion illustrations by Stina Wirsén and Liselotte Watkins.
- Bror Hjorts Hus 2013 – Solo exhibition with the main focus on illustrations from children's books, but also several fashion- and portrait illustration.
- Svenska Ambassaden i Tokyo 2012 – A big Swedish design exhibition during Tokyo Design Week. A collaboration between the Swedish Institute, Svensk Form and the Swedish Embassy in Tokyo.
- Nationalmuseum 2010 – The exhibition "Handgjort" (hand made). An exhibition with focus on the hand drawn line. A dialog between Stina Wirsén's illustrations and illustrations from the Swedish National Galley's own collection, for instance work by Rafaell, Angelica Kauffmann, John Bauer, Antoine Watteau and Matthias Grünewald.
- Konstnärshuset 2009 – Solo exhibition of reportage illustrations from Stockholm's bar- and restaurant life.
- Dunkers Kulturhus 2015 – Picture book and fashion sketches in connection with Swedish fashion designer Bea Szenfeld's solo exhibition.

== Selected books ==
- Jag har fått en klocka! 1991
- Sakboken 1995
- Djurboken 1995
- Liten och stor 1995
- Tussas Kalas 1996 (author Martin Vårdstedt and Anna Hörling)
- Siffror och Nuffror 1997 (author Anna Hörling)
- Hedvig! (author Frida Nilsson)
- Hedvig och sommaren med steken (author Frida Nilsson)
- Hedvig och Hardemos prinsessa (author Frida Nilsson)
- Hallå därinne! 2010 (author Ulf Stark)
- En stjärna vid namn Ajax (author Ulf Stark)
- Systern från havet (author Ulf Stark)
- Full cirkus på Sockerbullen 2012 (together with Carin Wirsén)
- Jag 2012
- Liten – a book about children's vulnerability and the responsibility of the grownups. Commissioned by the Swedish Crime Victim Compensation and Support Authority (Brottsoffermyndigheten) 2015

=== Children's book series – Rut och Knut ===
(author Carin Wirsén)

- Rut och Knut lagar mat
- Rut och Knut ställer ut
- Rut och Knut gräver ut
- Rut och Knut klär ut sig
- Rut och Knut börjar träna
- Rut och Knut och lilla Tjut
- ABC med Rut och Knut
- Lilla ABC med Rut och Knut
- Supershow med Rut och Knut

=== Children's book series – Vem? ===
- Vems byxor? 2005
- Vem är arg? 2005
- Vem bestämmer? 2006
- Vem blöder? 2006
- Vems mormor? 2007
- Vem är ensam? 2007
- Vem är söt? 2008
- Vem är borta? 2008
- Vem är bäst? 2009
- Vem sover inte? 2009
- Vem är död? 2010
- Vems kompis? 2010
- Vems bebis? 2011
- Vem städar inte? 2011
- Vem kommer nu? 2012
- Vem är sjuk? 2012
- Vem är var? 2012
- Vems hus? 2015
- Vem är stor? 2016
- Vems syskon? 2016

The "Vem?" books were made into an animated series in 2010 and are regularly broadcast on Sveriges Television.

=== Children's book series – Brokiga ===
- En liten skär och många små brokiga (author Carin Wirsén)
- Dela! 2013
- Titta! 2014
- Bygga! 2014
- Nej! 2015
- Rita! 2015
- Wirsén, Carin; Hörling, Anna; Wirsén, Stina (2014). Little Pink and the Motley Crew (in Swedish). Bonnierförlagens. ISBN 9789163879906. (Swedish: En liten skär och alla bråkiga brokiga)

== Selected awards ==
- The Society of Newspaper Design 1997
- The Society of Scandinavian Illustrators 2001
- Stockholms Stads Kulturpris
- Nordiska Tecknares Pris – Guld, Silver
- Award of Excellence by Society of Newspaper Design
- Elsa Beskow-plaketten 2000 for "Rut och Knut ställer ut”
- Expressens Heffaklump 2007 for "Supershow med Rut och Knut”
- Kolla! Svenska Tecknares Pris
