= Ulf Stark =

Swedish author and screenwriter

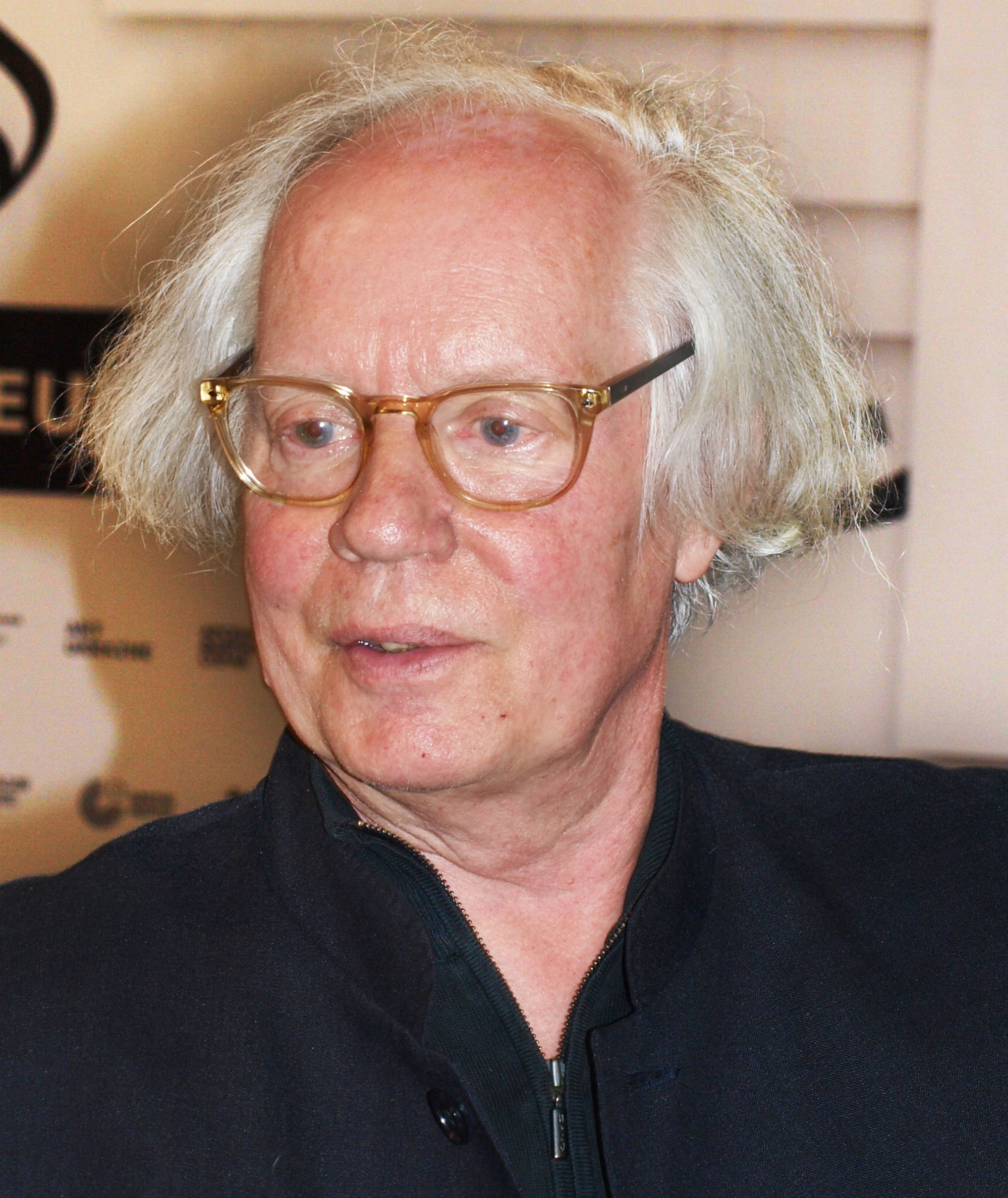
- Ulf Stark in 2016
- Born: 12 July 1944; Stockholm, Sweden
- Died: 13 June 2017 (aged 72); Stockholm, Sweden
- Occupation: Author

Ulf Gottfrid Stark (12 July 1944 – 13 June 2017) was a Swedish author and screenwriter (he adapted several of his own books for film and wrote the screenplay for the 1999 film Tsatsiki, morsan och polisen).

Stark has collaborated with the illustrators Anna Höglund and Mati Lepp.

From 1989 to 1998 he was an elected member of the Swedish Academy for Children's Books.

In 1998 he received the Nordic Children's Book Prize.

== Career ==
Stark was born and grew up in Stureby, Stockholm Municipality, which place features in several of his books. Stark's interest in writing started early; during his time at secondary school he was introduced to writing by his classmate Peter Curman, and in 1964 he wrote his first poetry collection, Ett hål till livet. Following this, Stark's interest in writing for a career was greatly encouraged.

Stark died on 13 June 2017 at the age of 72 after suffering from cancer.

== Selected bibliography ==
- 1966 – Sophämtarna
- 1967 – Skärgårdsliv
- 1975 – Petter och den röda fågeln (Stark's 1st children's book)
- 1976 – Petter och de upproriska grisarna
- 1978 – Patrik
- 1984 – Dårfinkar & dönickar
- 1985 – Maria Bleknos
- 1986 – Låt isbjörnarna dansa
- 1987 – Jaguaren (won the Nils Holgersson Plaque)
- 1987 – Sixten
- 1989 – Karlavagnen
- 1991 – Min vän Percys magiska gymnastikskor
- 1992 – Can You Whistle, Johanna? (won the 1994 Deutscher Jugendliteraturpreis)
- 1995 – Min vän shejken i Stureby
- 1996 – Min syster är en ängel (won the 1996 August Prize)
- 1997 – Ängeln och den blåa hästen
- 1997 – Inget trams
- 1998 – När pappa visade mej världsalltet
- 1998 – Lilla Asmodeus
- 2000 – Ensam med min bror
- 2000 – Den svarta fiolen
- 2001 – Mitt liv som Ulf
- 2001 – Vi läser storbildsblock
- 2001 – Hönsfjäderskorna
- 2002 – När mamma var indian
- 2002 – Göran och draken
- 2003 – Fullt med flugor i klassen
- 2003 – När jag besökte himlen
- 2004 – Kvällen när pappa lekte
- 2004 – Min vän Percy, Buffalo Bill och jag
- 2005 – Märklin och Turbin
- 2008 – En stjärna vid namn Ajax
- 2010 – De vilda helgonen
- 2012 – Jul i Stora Skogen
- 2016 – Nattåget
- 2016 – Lillasyster
- 2016 – Elmer Kock
- 2016 – Djur som ingen sett utom vi
- 2017 – Åskan
- 2017 – En natt ville Nalle vara stor
- 2017 – Kanel och Kanin och alla känslorna
- 2017 – Elmer Städare
- 2017 – Amy, Aron och anden
- 2018 – Elmer Djurdoktor
- 2018 – Rymlingarna
- 2018 – Elmer Spelman

=== English translations ===
- 2005 – Can You Whistle, Johanna?, (Gecko Press) ISBN 9780958259828
  - 2021 – Can You Whistle, Johanna?, (Gecko Press) ISBN 9781776573264
- 2005 – My Friend Percy's Magical Gym Shoes, (Gecko Press) ISBN 9780958259811
- 2007 – My Friend Percy and the Sheik, (Gecko Press) ISBN 9780958272018
- 2007 – My Friend Percy and Buffalo Bill, (Gecko Press) ISBN 9780958278713
- 2010 – Fruitloops and Dipsticks, (Gecko Press) ISBN 9781877467585
- 2015 – When Dad Showed Me the Universe, (Gecko Press) ISBN 9781927271827
- 2019 – The Runaways, (Gecko Press) ISBN 9781776572342
