= Gitte Spee =

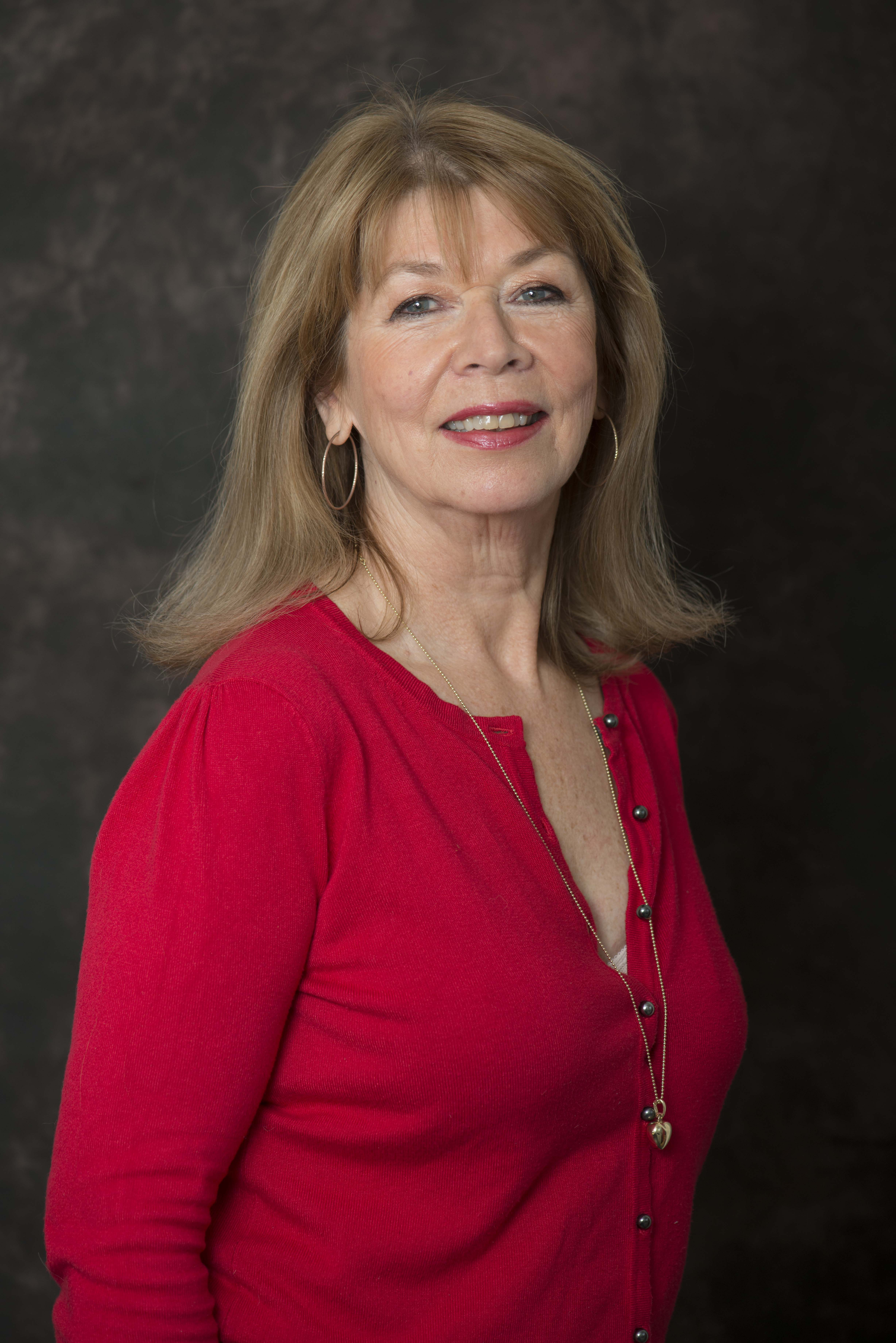
Gitte Spee

Gitte Spee (born December 29, 1950 in Surabaya), is a Dutch illustrator of children's books. She studied at the Gerrit Rietveld Academie, a renowned academy of fine art and design in the Netherlands, and currently works in Amsterdam. A number of the books she has illustrated have been translated into English by Gecko Press.

== Select English titles ==
- 2015 – Detective Gordon: The First Case, 96pp., (Gecko Press) ISBN 978-1-927271-50-6
- 2016 – Detective Gordon: A Complicated Case, 108pp., (Gecko Press) ISBN 978-1-776570-65-2
- 2017 – Detective Gordon: A Case in Any Case, 108pp., (Gecko Press) ISBN 978-1-776571-09-3
- 2018 – Detective Gordon: A Case for Buffy, 112pp., (Gecko Press) ISBN 9781776571796
