= Patrick van Deurzen =

Dutch composer

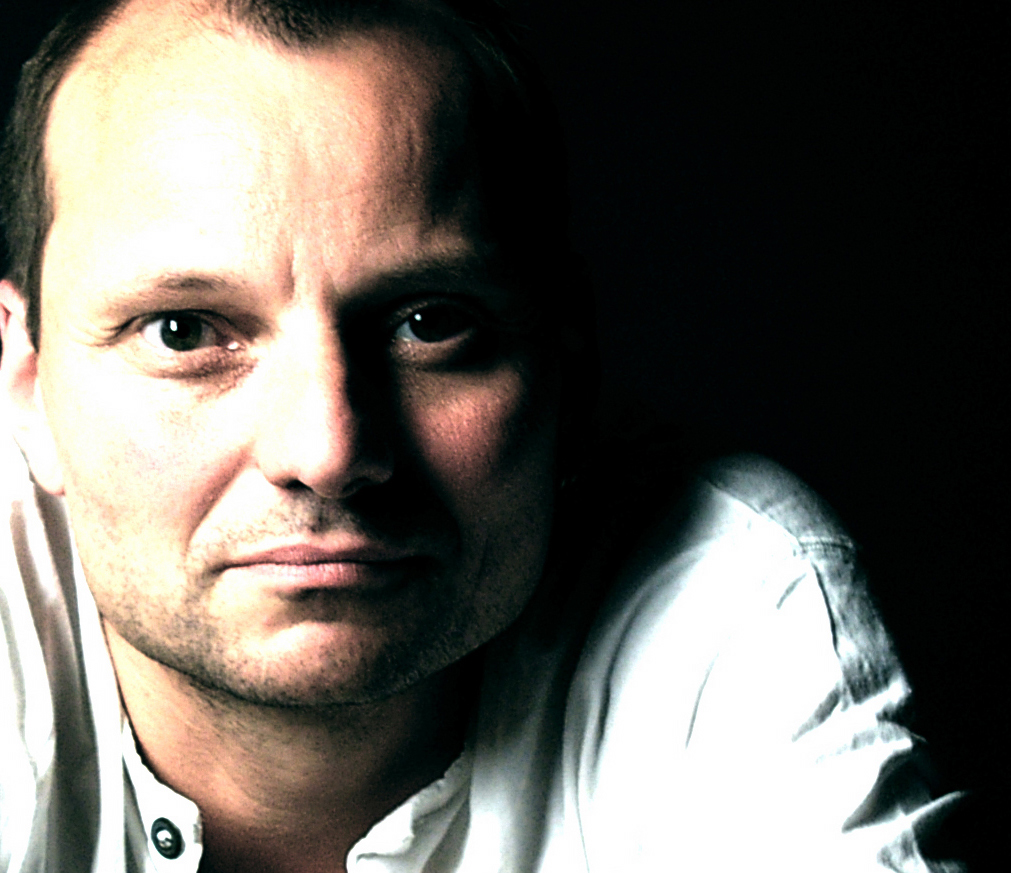
Patrick van Deurzen

Patrick van Deurzen (Eindhoven, 27 January 1964) is a Dutch composer.

== Biography ==
Patrick Deurzen studied guitar with Dick Hoogeveen and Music Theory with Peter-Jan Wagemans and Jan Kleinbussink at the Rotterdam Conservatory. As a composer he is self-taught but attended classes of instrumentation Klaas de Vries with whom he has had regular work meetings. He also received some composition lessons from Wagemans. He worked as a guitarist, conductor, singer and wrote several articles on 20th-century music. He also worked on several documentaries for the NPS, which include Schoenberg's Moses and Aaron and Alban Berg s violin concerto. Currently he is active as a composer and teaches at the Royal Conservatory in The Hague and Codarts Rotterdam.

The idea that Pavlovian association is a feature that makes man unique is the starting point of Van Deurzens composing. Deurzen also often adds text that the musicians should recite to add a different level of meaning to the composition, as in his quintet Choral, Prelude & Fugue (2005) where each part contains texts of Don Quixote. In 2002 he won the Second international composition competition for choral music in Hasselt (Belgium), Deux poèmes the Baudelaire for a cappella choir, conducted by the Flemish Radio Choir.

== Compositions ==
- Deux poèmes de Baudelaire (2001, Mixed choir)
- Four solo's for Bass clarinet (2001, Bass clarinet)
- Cantigas d'amor (2001, Singer, Piano)
- Duo (2002, Clarinet, Oboe)
- Three (2005, Violin, Horn, percussion)
- Langs de Randen van de Nacht (Past the edges of the night) (2005, Horn, Strings, harp, percussion)
- Eight scenes from Alice (2005, Female choir, percussion)
- Choral, Fugue e Prelude (2005, Wind quintet)
- Six: a line is a dot that went for a walk (2006, Flugelhorn, Percussion, Double bas)
- ceux qui sont venus du ciel (2006, A-clarinet)
- Seven (2006, String quartet)
- Geheime Tuin (Secret Garden, poems by Hendrik de Vries) (2007, Two soprano's, soprano-/altsax, harmonium, percussion)
- Thank God Sylvia! We're alive! (2007, Orchestra. Strings and Percussion)
- If I were God (2007, Mixed choir with viola and cello; text by Astrid Lindgren)
- Wahnbrot, sechs chorstücke nach Paul Celan (2008, Mixed choir)
- Les Tènébres (2008, Voice, piano and optional film; text from Baudelaire)
- Turris Babel (2009, pre-study, Female quintet)
- Love Song (2009, Male quintet and string quartet)
- Improvising on Bach's Prelude in C minor (2009, Piano)
- Three Songs (2010, Singer, Guitar; Poems by Marianne Grootenboer)
- Turris Babel (2010, Female quintet, stones, sticks and water; text from Athanasius Kircher and the Bible)
- Monologue (2011, Cello)
- Tornado (2011, Orchestra. Strings, 2 oboes, 2 horns)
