= Örby slott =

Urban district in Stockholm Municipality, Sweden

Coordinates: 59°16′56″N 18°01′46″E

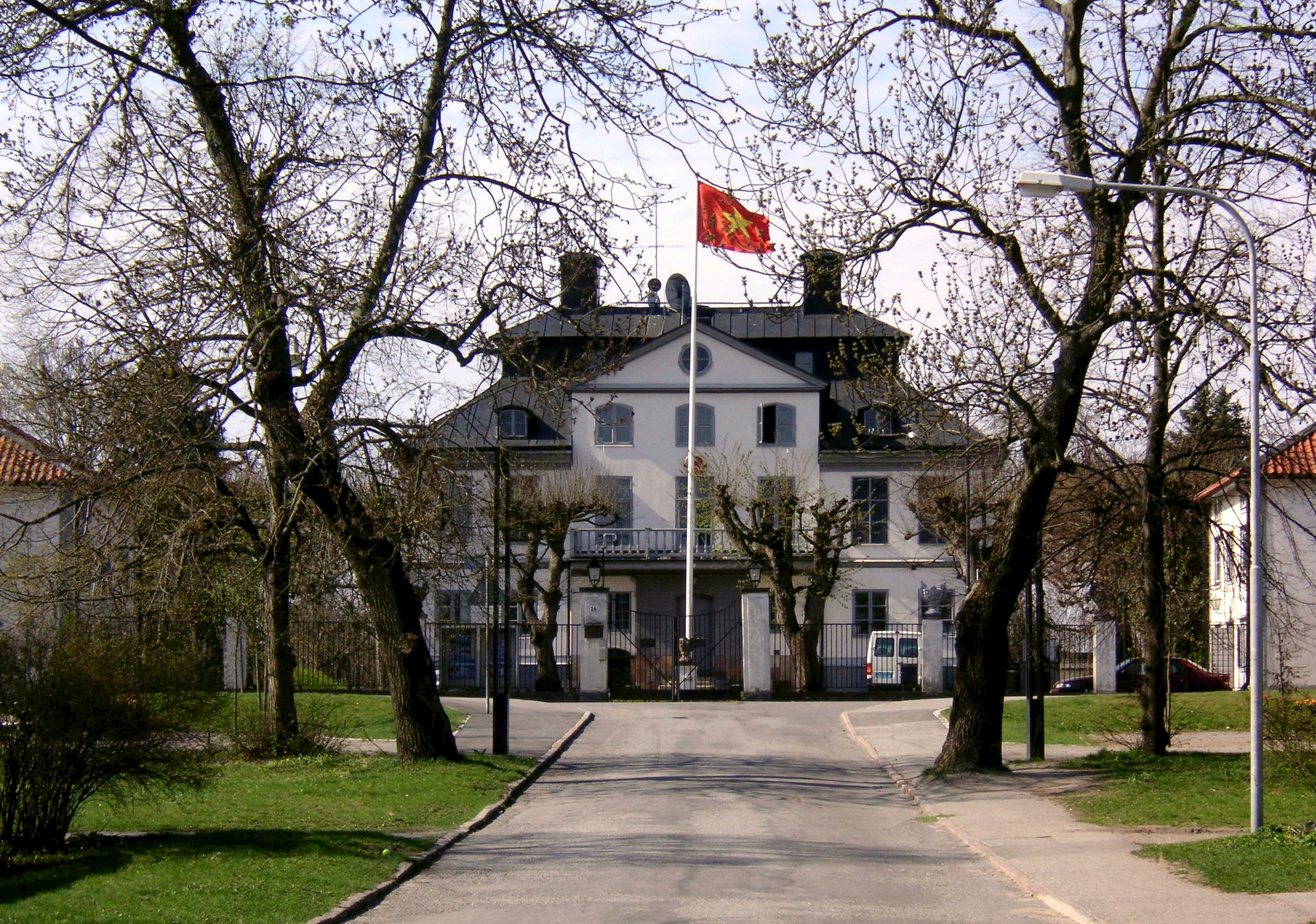
Örby Manor

Örby slott is a residential area in the suburb of Söderort in Stockholm Municipality, Sweden. It has an area of 67 hectares (170 acres) and had 1,888 inhabitants in 2017.

Örby took its name from Örby Manor (Örby slott) which is situated in the area and which also has given name to the neighbouring residential area of Örby. The modern area was created in 1956. Örby manor was built by nobleman and official Henrik Falkenberg (1634-1691) Falkenberg was governor of Älvsborg county, The former manor is now used by the Embassy of Vietnam.
