= Stureby =

Neighborhood in Stockholm, Sweden

Coordinates: 59°17′N 18°03′E

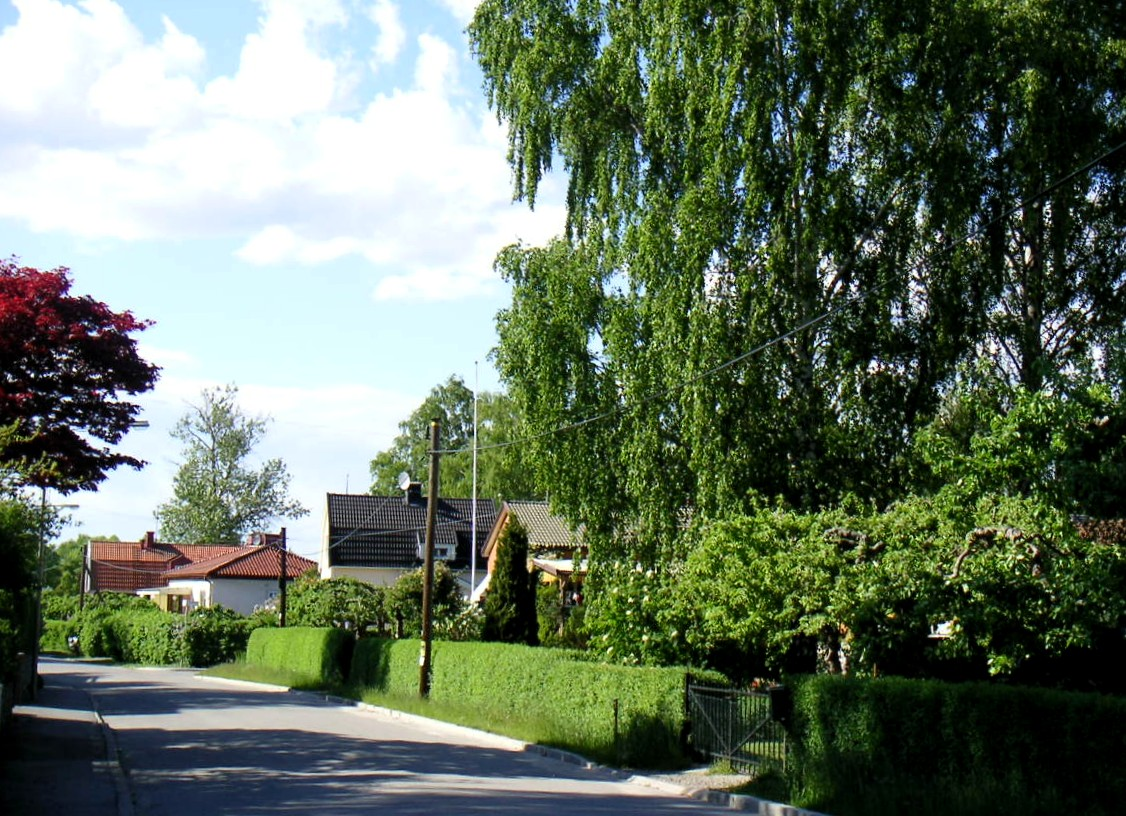
The residential area in Stureby.

Stureby is a residential area in southern Stockholm, approx. 3 kilometers from Skanstull. The district at 205 hectares is bordered with Örby, Örby slott, Östberga, Årstafältet, Gamla Enskede, Svedmyra, Gubbängen and Bandhagen.

There were farms in the area where Stureby is located in the year 1689 according to a map. The area started to be developed in the year 1921 by the company Fastighets AB Villahem. In 1923 the politicians in Stockholm decided to build a retirement home that was named Gammelbyn to commemorate Gustav Vasa's arrival in Stockholm 400 years earlier. The area was named Stureby after Sten Sture the Younger in 1926. In 1930 the retirement home Gammelbyn was finished and also a new tram station that was part of the tram line Örbybanan. Stureby nursing home opened in 1935. There once lived 1000 people in the retirement home and the nursing home. In 1938 a cinema named Tusse-bio opened in Stureby and was renamed to Corso in 1939. The tram line in Stureby was improved in the 1940s but got replaced with the metro in 1951. In 1953 the temporary metro station Stureby was made permanent and was then an end station. During the 1950s there was an elementary school called Sturebyskolan built and also some apartment blocks were built. Landstinget took over the retirement home Gammelbyn in 1971 and renamed it to Stureby sjukhus. The elementary school was renovated in the year 2000 and currently has 1000 students.

== Gallery ==
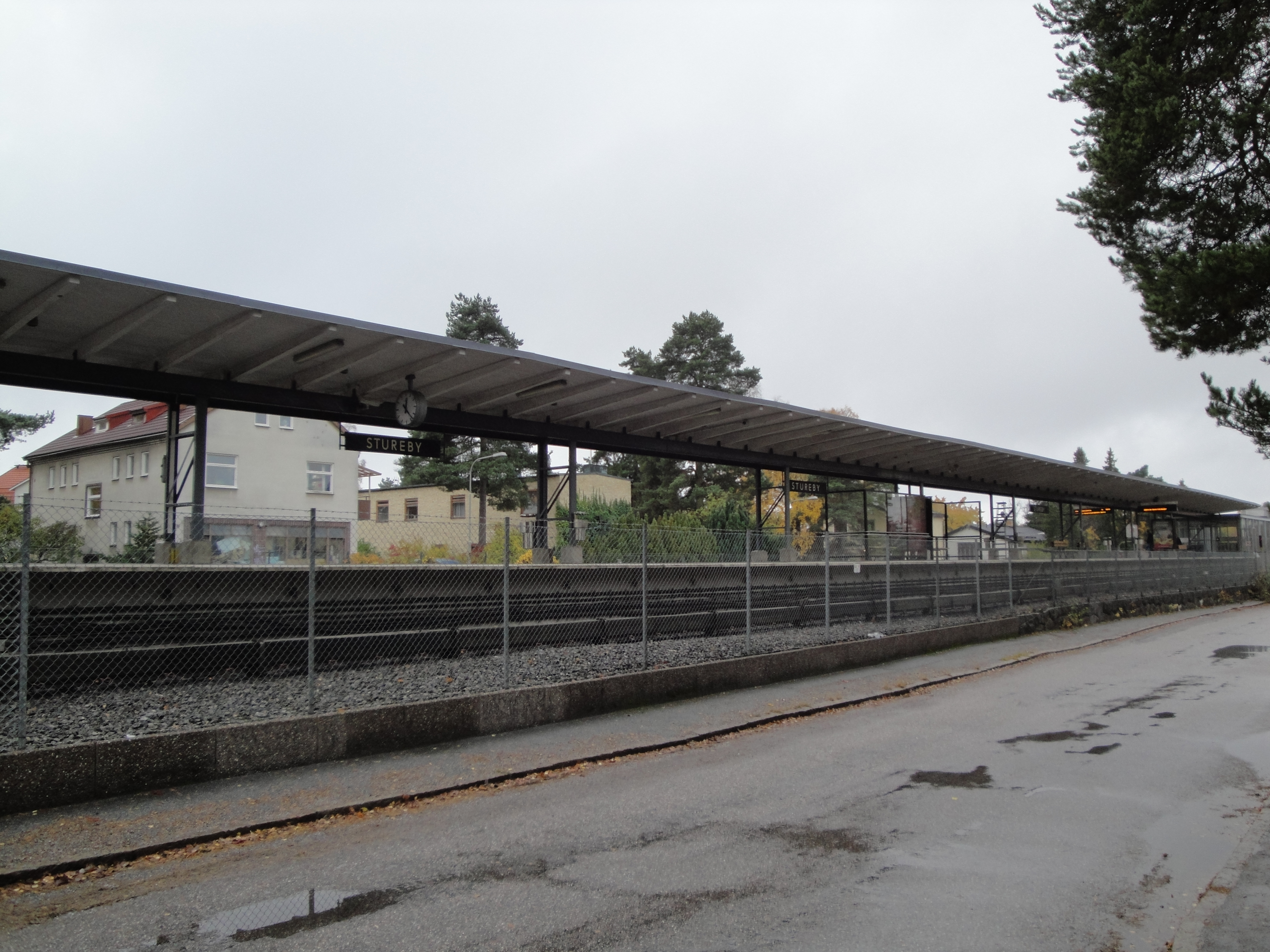
Stureby metro station.

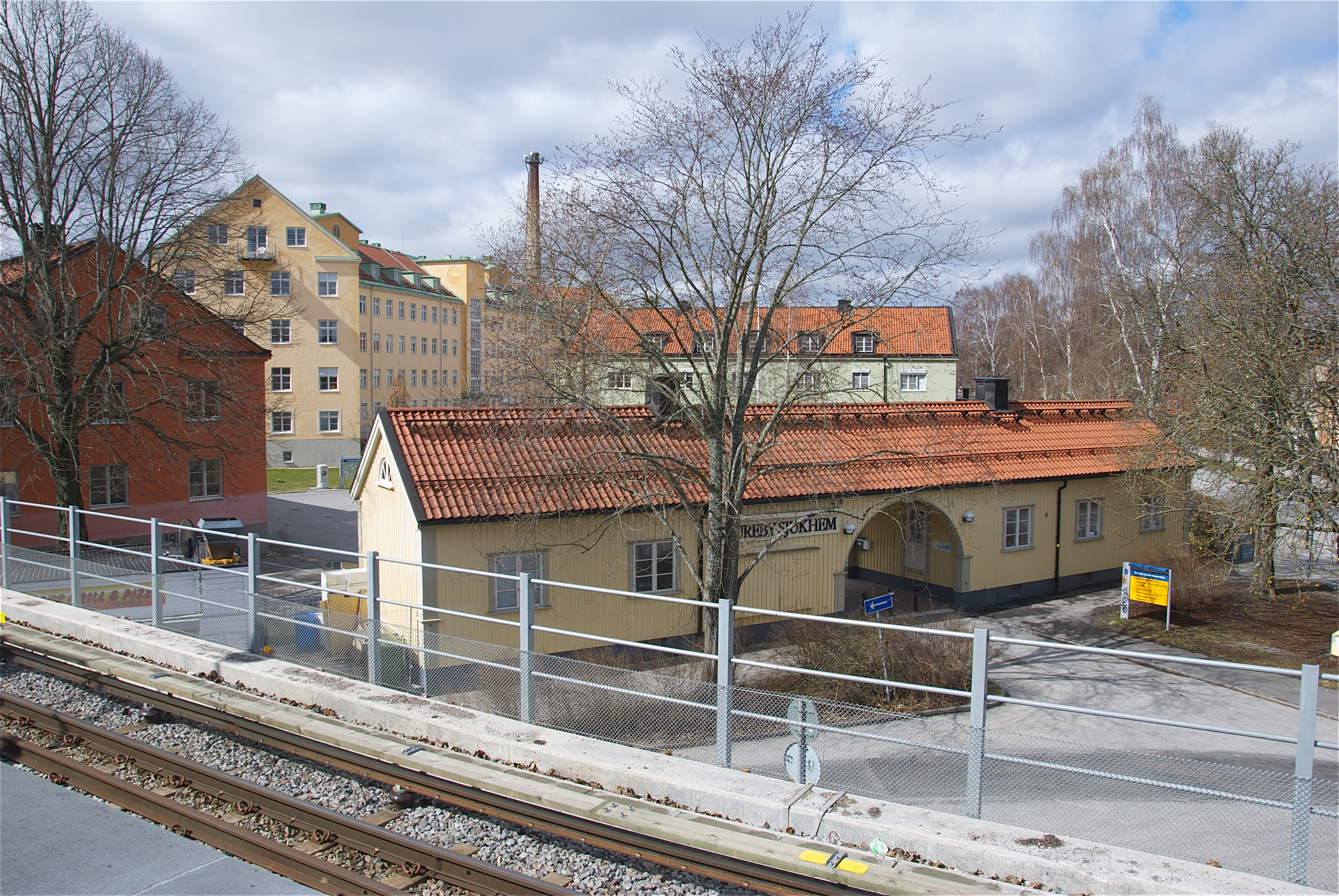
Stureby sjukhem viewed from Svedmyra (tunnelbanestation).

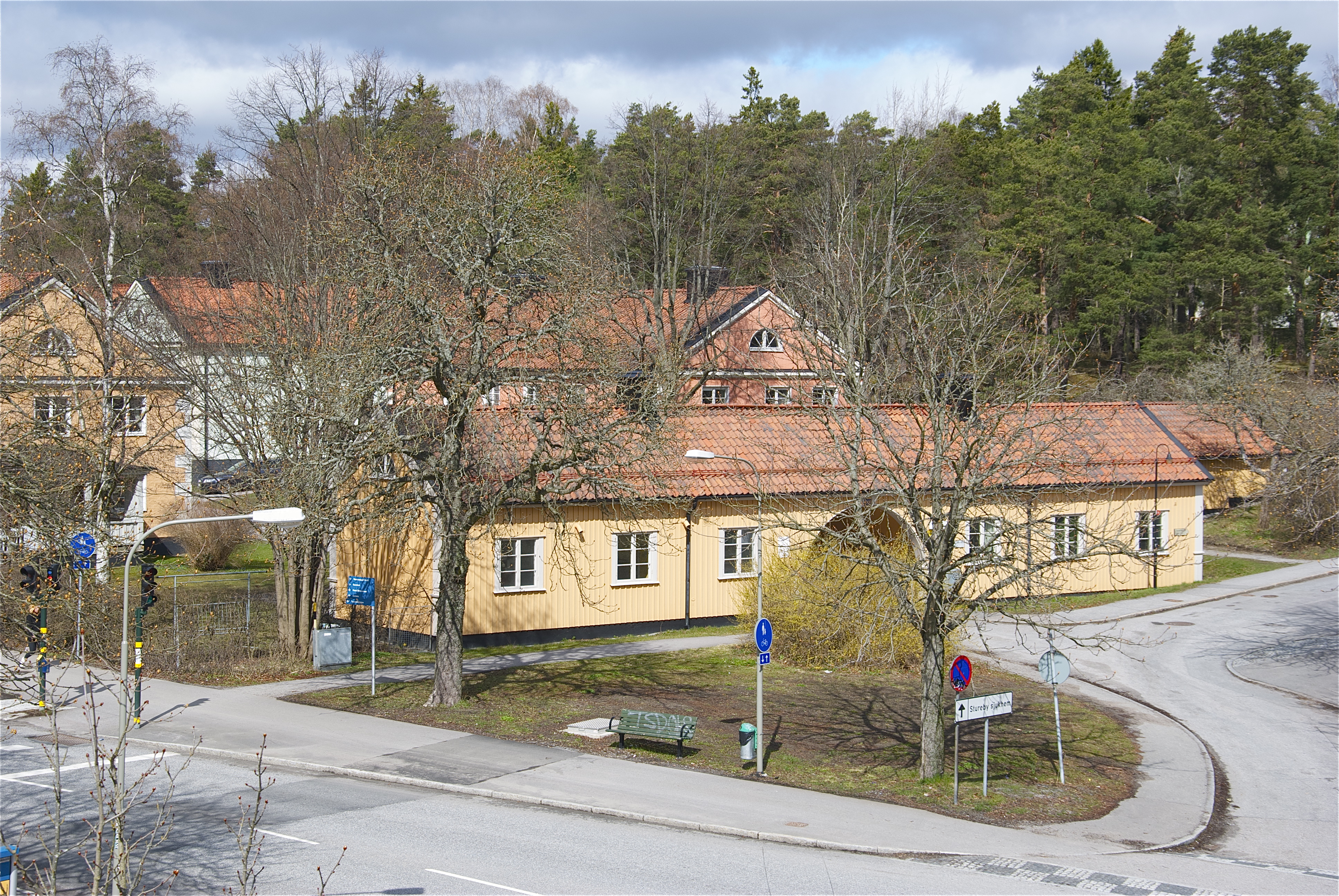
Gammelbyn (earlier a retirement home) viewed from Svedmyra (tunnelbanestation).

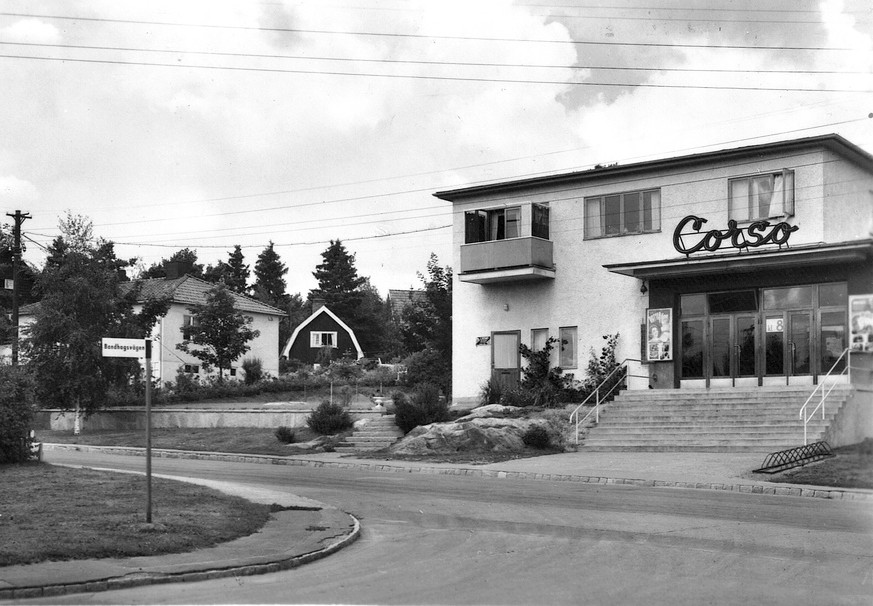
Cinema Corso in the 1950s.

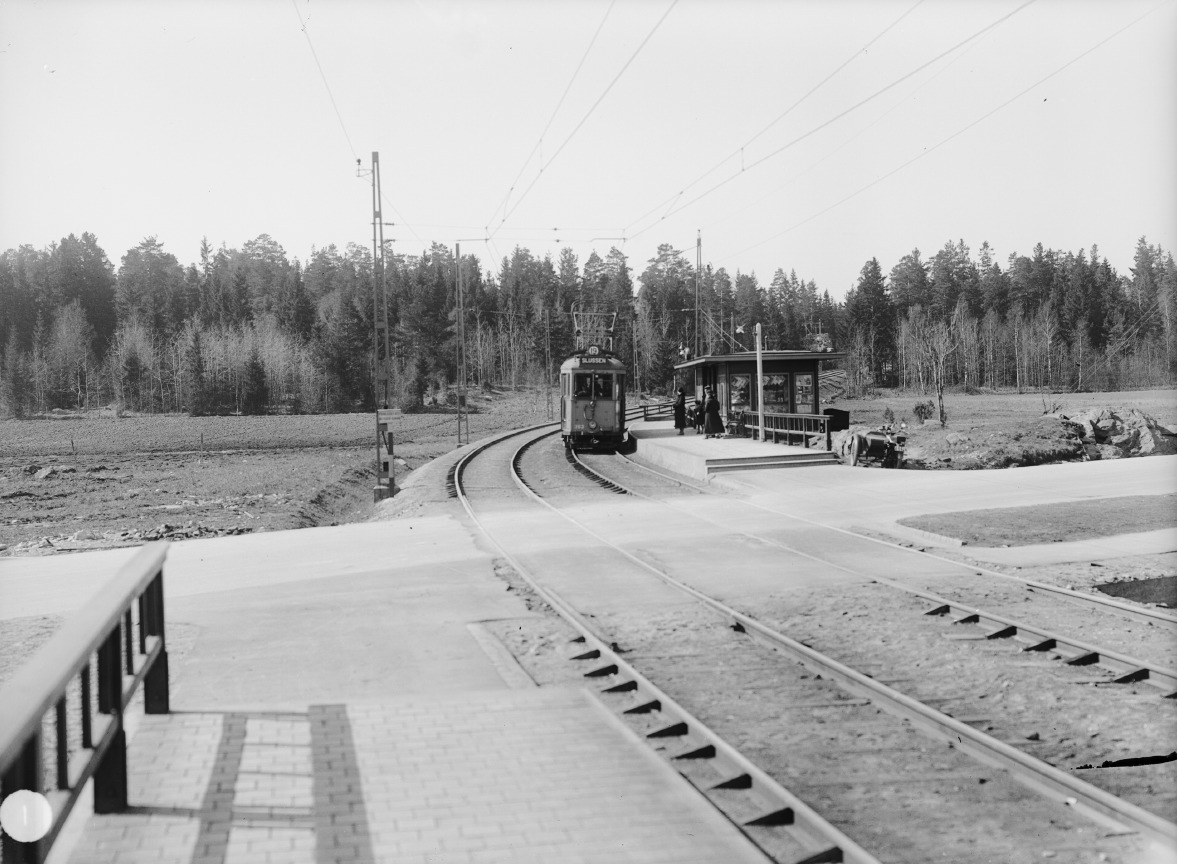
1931, a tram on the tram line Örbybanan heading to Slussen stops at the tram stop Svedmyran in Stureby. The road Tussmötevägen is in the foreground.
