= Noémi Besedes =

Swiss actress and model

- Noémi Besedes
- Born: 14 March 1980 (age 45); Basel, Switzerland
- Citizenship: Swiss
- Education: European Film Actor School
- Height: 165 cm (5 ft 5 in)
- Website: noemibesedes.com

Noémi Besedes is a Swiss actress and model.

She was television presenter at the start of VIVA Switzerland in 1999.

== Filmography ==
| Year | Produced by | Title | Type | Role | Director | Filming location | Film length | IMDb |
|---|---|---|---|---|---|---|---|---|
| 2009 | DAGO Kinderlobby e.V., David Aufdembrinke | Never Violence | Short film | Mother | David Aufdembrinke | Schleswig-Holstein | 6 min | 1515879 |
| 2013 | RTL/Grundy UFA | Gute Zeiten, schlechte Zeiten (GZSZ) | TV series | Alexandra Happe | Klaus Witting | Berlin, Germany | n.a. | 2862810 (Season 1, Episode 5228 (2013-04-19)); 2862794 (Season 1, Episode 5227 (2013-04-18)) |
| 2012 | ZDF/Monaco Film/Odeon Film | Der Kriminalist | TV crime series | Sandra Schiller | Christian Görlitz | Berlin, Germany | n.a. | 2466554 (Season 10, Episode 4, 'Blaues Blut' (2012-11-02)) |
| 2011 | Desert Flower | The Pursuit of Unhappiness | | Blond woman | Sherry Hormann | | 87 min | 1951076 |
| 2011 | Warner Bros. Entertainment | Men Do What They Can | | Katja Riebinger | Marc Rothemund | Berlin, Germany | 108 min | 2036408 |
| 2009 | Universal Pictures | Inglourious Basterds | | German movie star | Quentin Tarantino | Berlin, Germany | 153 min | 0361748 |
| 2009 | MTV/Good Guy Marketing | FRIENDSHIP MTV SPOT | | Driver | David Reimers | Berlin, Germany | | |
| 2009 | ARD/Grundy UFA | Verbotene Liebe | TV series | Anna Lindenau | Ute Hilgefort | Cologne, Germany | n.a. | 1585963 (Season 1, Episode 2645 (2006-03-06)) |
| 2009 | RTL/Grundy UFA | Unter uns | TV series | Rosi Hartmann | Frank Fabisch | Cologne, Germany | n.a. | 1066206 (Season 1, Episode 2671 (2005-09-12)) |
| 2008 | | Waiting for Ralf | | Sylvie (lead) | Silvia Kaiser | Cologne, Germany | 15 min | |
