= Stéphanie Blake =

American writer

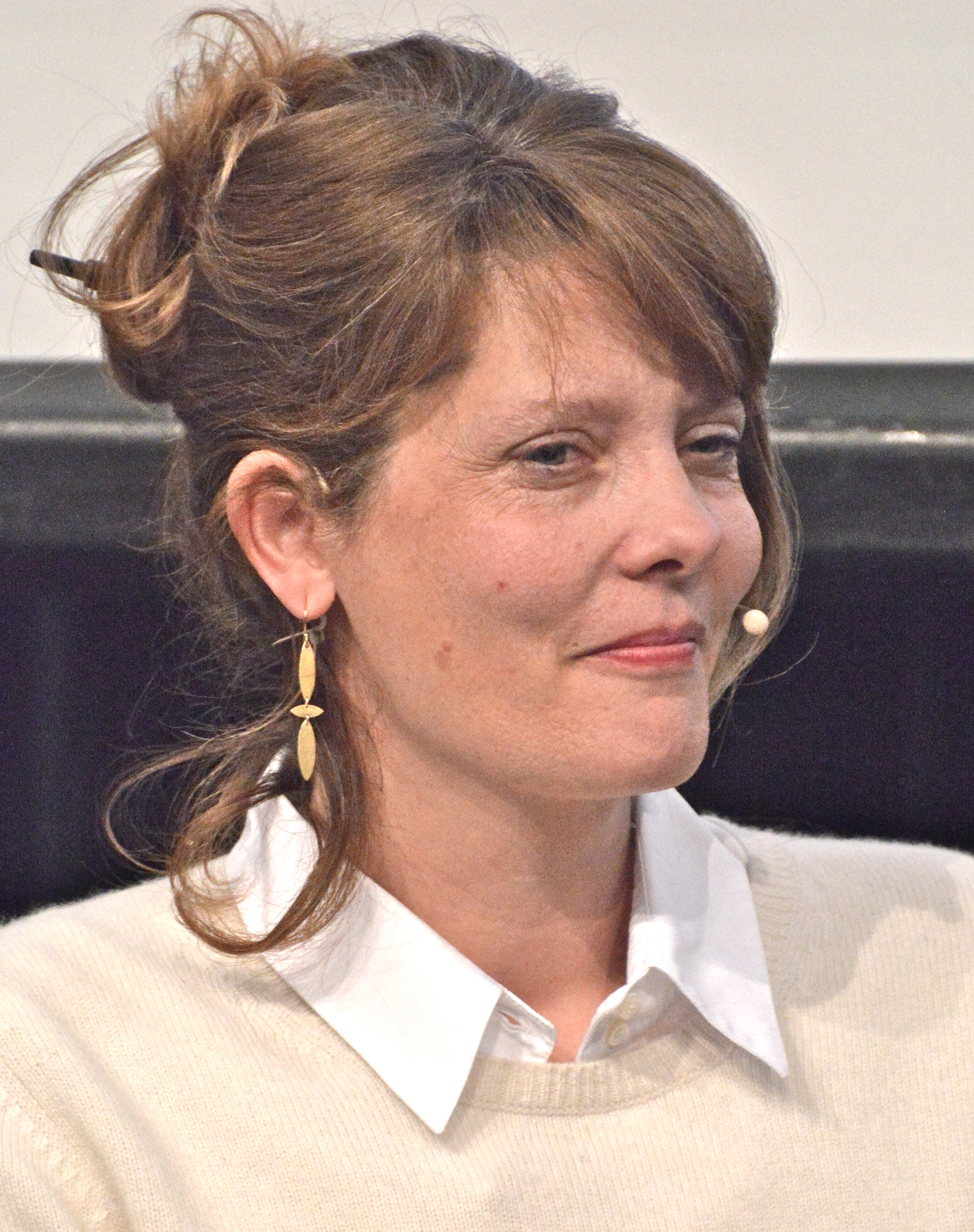
Stephanie Blake in 2013

Stéphanie Blake (born 1968 in Northfield, Minnesota) is an American French author of children's stories who lives in Paris.

She had been published by Random House, l'école des loisirs and Gecko Press. Her works have been translated from French into English, Spanish, Swedish, Norwegian, Portuguese, German, Polish, Dutch, Korean, Japanese, Chinese, Māori and Italian.

== Simon the Rabbit ==
Blake is best known for her children's picture book series Simon, about the titular anthropomorphic rabbit, which in 2016 was adapted into an animated series, and has since been seen around the world.

== Books in English ==
Published by Gecko Press:

- 2011 – Poo Bum, 32pp., ISBN 978-1-877467-97-4
- 2012 – Stupid Baby, 36pp., ISBN 978-1-877579-31-8
- 2013 – A Deal's A Deal, 32pp., ISBN 978-1-877579-84-4
- 2014 − I Don't Want to Go to School, 28pp., ISBN 978-1-877579-08-0
- 2015 – I Want Spaghetti!, 32pp., ISBN 978-1-927271-92-6
- 2016 – Super Rabbit, 32pp., ISBN 978-1-877579-57-8
- 2017 – I Can't Sleep, 40pp., ISBN 978-1-776571-64-2
- 2018 – I'm the Biggest, 32pp., ISBN 978-1-776572-02-1
- 2019 – Nits, 32pp., ISBN 978-1-776572-23-6
- 2022 – Wooolf!, 32pp., ISBN 9781776574834
- 2023 – Nooo! Not the Dentist, 32pp., ISBN 9781776575312

== Other publications ==
Māori translation of Poo Bum:

- 2019 – Paraweta (Gecko Press), 32pp., ISBN 978-1-776572-18-2

Games:

- 2016 – Poo Bum Memory Card Game, ISBN 978-1-776571-00-0
