= Gamla Östberga =

Area of Stockholm, Sweden

Coordinates: 59.285928°N 18.038647°E

Gamla Östberga ("Old East Hills") is an area of southern Stockholm, Sweden. It encompasses the older and eastern part of Östberga. Östbergastaden ("city of East Hills") was built by HSB in 1957–59 as an experimental district with exemptions from parts of the existing construction legislation. The buildings are long 3–4 floor lamellae, as well as three nine-floor point buildings erected to mark the district and the location of central east hills. This district is an early example of modern element construction using concrete, and eternit to some extent. The district was first restored in 1979 when the buildings were fitted with additional insulation. In the second restoration in 1993, all building fronts were repaired.
