= Frida Nilsson =

Swedish children's writer (born 1979)

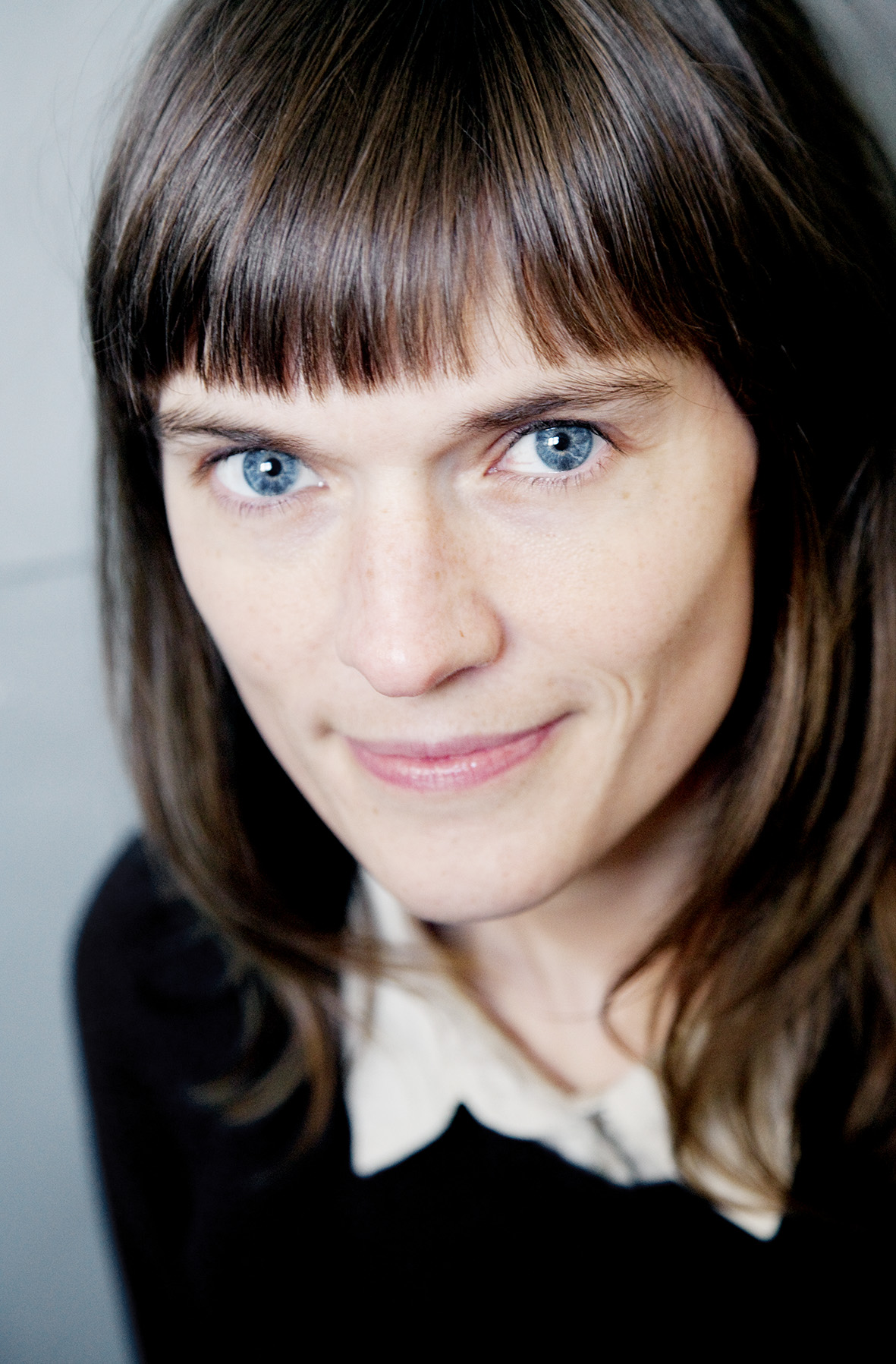
- Frida Nilsson in 2012
- Born: 1979 (age 46–47); Hardemo, Sweden
- Occupation: Writer
- Writing career
- Language: Swedish

Frida Nilsson (born 1979) is a Swedish children’s writer whose first book was published in 2004. She has won numerous international shortlistings and prizes, including the August Prize, the German Youth Literature Prize, Expressens Heffaklump (2015) and the Astrid Lindgren Prize. She was recently chosen as one of the best emerging writers in Europe under 39 (Hay Festival’s Aarhus 39, 2017). Nilsson’s writing is characterised by playfulness and sincerity. She has been compared to Roald Dahl and Barbro Lindgren.

== Swedish bibliography ==
- 2017 – Det tunna svärdet (Natur & Kultur)
- 2015 – Ishavspirater (Natur & Kultur)
- 2014 – God jul, Lilla Lök (Rabén & Sjögren)
- 2013 – Jagger Jagger (Natur & Kultur)
- 2011 – Ryska kyssen (Rabén & Sjögren)
- 2009 – Hedvig och Hardemos prinsessa (Natur & Kultur)
- 2008 – Jag, Dante och miljonerna (Natur & Kultur)
- 2007 – Hedvig och sommaren med Steken (Natur & Kultur)
- 2006 – Hedvig och Max-Olov (Natur & Kultur)
- 2005 – Apstjärnan (Natur & Kultur)
- 2005 – Hedvig! (Natur & Kultur)
- 2004 – Kråkans otroliga liftarsemester (Natur & Kultur)

English translations

- 2017 – The Ice Sea Pirates (Gecko Press) ISBN 9781776572007
- 2020 – Hattie (Gecko Press) ISBN 9781776572717
- 2021 – Hattie and Olaf (Gecko Press)

== Awards and accolades ==
- 2019 - Winner of the James Krüss Award for International Children's Literature
- 2017 – Hay Festival Aarhus 39 selection
- 2016 – Winner of Expressen's Heffaklumpen Award for The Ice Sea Pirates
- 2016 – Winner of the Nils Holgersson Plaque for The Ice Sea Pirates
- 2016 – Winner of the BMF Plaque for The Ice Sea Pirates
- 2016 – White Ravens selection for The Ice Sea Pirates
- 2016 – Nordic Council Prize nomination for The Ice Sea Pirates
- 2015 – August Prize nomination for The Ice Sea Pirates
- 2015 – Nordic Council Prize nomination for Jagger Jagger
- 2014 – Astrid Lindgren Prize
- 2013 – Les Olympiades winner for Apstjärnan
- 2013 – Prix Tam-Tam "J'aime Lire" nomination for Apstjärnan
- 2013 – August Prize nomination for Jagger Jagger
- 2011 – Deutscher Jugendliteraturpreis nomination for Apstjärnan
- 2006 – August Prize nominee
