= Gecko Press =

Company publisher of children's books in Wellington, New Zealand

- Founded: 2005
- Founder: Julia Marshall ONZM
- Country of origin: New Zealand
- Headquarters location: Wellington
- Distribution: Harper Entertainment Distribution Services (NZ and AUS); Lerner (US); Bounce! Sales & Marketing (UK)
- Publication types: Children's Books
- Official website: www.geckopress.com

Gecko Press is an independent publisher of children's books based in Wellington, New Zealand. The company was founded in 2005 by Julia Marshall, formerly of Appelberg Publishing Agency, winner of the Storylines Margaret Mahy Medal 2021. Marshall was appointed Officer of the New Zealand Order of Merit (ONZM) in 2025.

Gecko Press publishes English translations of popular books from countries including France, Taiwan, Sweden, Japan, Germany, Poland and the Netherlands. Gecko Press also publish 2–4 original titles each year.

== Authors and illustrators ==
Gecko Press has published and translated a wide range of children's book authors and illustrators. These include:

- Barbro Lindgren
- Dorothée de Monfreid
- Eva Eriksson
- Frida Nilsson
- Gavin Bishop
- Gitte Spee
- Grégoire Solotareff
- Joy Cowley
- Juliette MacIver
- Kate De Goldi
- Margaret Mahy
- Michal Shalev
- Rose Lagercrantz
- Sarah Davis
- Sarah Wilkins
- Stéphanie Blake
- Timo Parvela
- Ulf Nilsson
- Ulf Stark

== Books ==
Gecko Press publishes fiction and non-fiction books for children. Some of its most successful books to date include: Duck, Death and the Tulip, which has also been adapted as a stage production and short film, and Poo Bum by Stéphanie Blake.

== Awards ==
Since it was established, Gecko Press has been internationally recognised. Prizes include:

- 2018 – Shortlisted, New Zealand Book Awardsfor Children and Young Adults - The Longest Breakfast
- 2017 – Best Publisher winner at the New Zealand Book Industry Awards
- 2017 – Winner, Best Picture book at the New Zealand Book Awards for Children and Young Adults, for That's Not A Hippopotamus!
- 2016 – Nominated for Marsh Award for Children's Literature in Translation for Detective Gordon: The First Case
- 2013 – Best Children's Publisher of the Year in Oceania at Bologna Children's Book Fair
- 2012, 2011 – Finalist, New Zealand Thorpe-Bowker Publisher of the Year
- 2010 – Runner up, New Zealand Thorpe-Bower Publisher of the Year
- 2010 – New Zealand Post Children's Book Awards Children's Choice Junior Fiction award for Friends: Snake and Lizard, by Joy Cowley
- 2010 – Winner Creative Gold Wellington regional business Gold Awards
- 2009 – Finalist, Wellington regional business Gold Awards
- 2008 – Winner, New Zealand Thorpe-Bowker Publisher of the Year
- 2008 – Sunday Star-Times NZ Children's Publisher of the Year
- 2008 – New Zealand Post Children's Book Awards Book of the Year for Snake and Lizard by Joy Cowley
