= List of minor planets: 474001–475000 =

The following is a partial list of minor planets, running from minor-planet number 474001 through 475000, inclusive. The primary data for this and other partial lists is based on JPL's "Small-Body Orbital Elements" and data available from the Minor Planet Center. Critical list information is also provided by the MPC, unless otherwise specified from Lowell Observatory. A detailed description of the table's columns and additional sources are given on the main page including a complete list of every page in this series, and a statistical break-up on the dynamical classification of minor planets.

Also see the summary list of all named bodies in numerical and alphabetical order, and the corresponding naming citations for the number range of this particular list. New namings may only be added to this list after official publication, as the preannouncement of names is condemned by the Working Group for Small Bodies Nomenclature of the International Astronomical Union.

Near-Earth obj.	MBA (inner)	MBA (outer)	Centaur
Mars-crosser	MBA (middle)	Jupiter trojan	Trans-Neptunian obj.
Unclassified

== 474001–474100 ==
Designation			Discovery			Properties		Ref
Permanent	Provisional	Named after	Date	Site	Discoverer(s)	Category	Diam.	Ref
474001	2016 FN_{35}	—	January 7, 2005	Kitt Peak	Spacewatch	·	2.0 km	MPC · JPL
474002	2016 FP_{35}	—	March 3, 2005	Kitt Peak	Spacewatch	·	930 m	MPC · JPL
474003	2016 FU_{35}	—	February 1, 2012	Kitt Peak	Spacewatch	·	910 m	MPC · JPL
474004	2016 FB_{41}	—	June 16, 2004	Kitt Peak	Spacewatch	·	2.1 km	MPC · JPL
474005	2016 FE_{41}	—	April 11, 2007	Catalina	CSS	·	2.5 km	MPC · JPL
474006	2016 FH_{41}	—	April 10, 2005	Kitt Peak	Spacewatch	EOS	2.6 km	MPC · JPL
474007	2016 FB_{42}	—	March 13, 2007	Mount Lemmon	Mount Lemmon Survey	HOF	2.8 km	MPC · JPL
474008	2016 FS_{46}	—	October 22, 2009	Mount Lemmon	Mount Lemmon Survey	·	1.9 km	MPC · JPL
474009	2016 FJ_{50}	—	October 8, 2004	Kitt Peak	Spacewatch	·	700 m	MPC · JPL
474010	2016 FP_{50}	—	February 14, 2010	Kitt Peak	Spacewatch	·	3.2 km	MPC · JPL
474011	2016 FG_{52}	—	October 18, 2006	Kitt Peak	Spacewatch	·	1.6 km	MPC · JPL
474012	2016 FB_{54}	—	September 7, 2004	Kitt Peak	Spacewatch	·	2.1 km	MPC · JPL
474013	2016 FO_{54}	—	March 29, 2000	Socorro	LINEAR	·	2.1 km	MPC · JPL
474014	2016 GO_{1}	—	May 4, 2005	Kitt Peak	Spacewatch	·	1.1 km	MPC · JPL
474015	2016 GU_{3}	—	June 15, 2007	Kitt Peak	Spacewatch	·	2.6 km	MPC · JPL
474016	2016 GB_{8}	—	April 8, 2010	WISE	WISE	·	4.7 km	MPC · JPL
474017	2016 GP_{10}	—	September 19, 2008	Kitt Peak	Spacewatch	·	1.6 km	MPC · JPL
474018	2016 GO_{15}	—	March 8, 2005	Mount Lemmon	Mount Lemmon Survey	·	1.0 km	MPC · JPL
474019	2016 GH_{28}	—	March 11, 2005	Mount Lemmon	Mount Lemmon Survey	·	970 m	MPC · JPL
474020	2016 GU_{29}	—	February 9, 2005	Mount Lemmon	Mount Lemmon Survey	MAS	670 m	MPC · JPL
474021	2016 GL_{48}	—	January 12, 1996	Kitt Peak	Spacewatch	·	620 m	MPC · JPL
474022	2016 GD_{65}	—	December 20, 2009	Catalina	CSS	·	2.9 km	MPC · JPL
474023	2016 GW_{110}	—	October 9, 2007	Kitt Peak	Spacewatch	·	850 m	MPC · JPL
474024	2016 GM_{119}	—	December 8, 2010	Kitt Peak	Spacewatch	·	1.3 km	MPC · JPL
474025	2016 GO_{125}	—	October 28, 2011	Kitt Peak	Spacewatch	·	1.0 km	MPC · JPL
474026	2016 GX_{125}	—	March 13, 2007	Catalina	CSS	·	2.1 km	MPC · JPL
474027	2016 GX_{131}	—	April 6, 2005	Catalina	CSS	·	3.3 km	MPC · JPL
474028	2016 GD_{132}	—	December 19, 2004	Mount Lemmon	Mount Lemmon Survey	V	730 m	MPC · JPL
474029	2016 GV_{132}	—	February 9, 2007	Mount Lemmon	Mount Lemmon Survey	MAR	1.2 km	MPC · JPL
474030	2016 GD_{151}	—	July 25, 2000	Kitt Peak	Spacewatch	·	4.7 km	MPC · JPL
474031	2016 GV_{161}	—	March 26, 2007	Mount Lemmon	Mount Lemmon Survey	·	2.8 km	MPC · JPL
474032	2016 GX_{179}	—	November 18, 2006	Mount Lemmon	Mount Lemmon Survey	·	1.5 km	MPC · JPL
474033	2016 GQ_{181}	—	May 12, 2007	Mount Lemmon	Mount Lemmon Survey	·	2.6 km	MPC · JPL
474034	2016 GT_{185}	—	March 10, 2005	Kitt Peak	Spacewatch	·	2.6 km	MPC · JPL
474035	2016 GW_{191}	—	November 11, 2004	Anderson Mesa	LONEOS	·	2.2 km	MPC · JPL
474036	2016 GH_{208}	—	May 12, 2011	Mount Lemmon	Mount Lemmon Survey	·	3.3 km	MPC · JPL
474037	2016 GX_{216}	—	March 9, 2005	Mount Lemmon	Mount Lemmon Survey	NYS	1.1 km	MPC · JPL
474038	2016 GE_{217}	—	April 22, 1998	Kitt Peak	Spacewatch	·	1.6 km	MPC · JPL
474039	2016 GT_{217}	—	November 13, 2006	Kitt Peak	Spacewatch	·	1.5 km	MPC · JPL
474040	2016 GG_{218}	—	May 26, 2003	Kitt Peak	Spacewatch	·	3.3 km	MPC · JPL
474041	2016 GL_{225}	—	September 9, 2004	Socorro	LINEAR	·	1.6 km	MPC · JPL
474042	2016 GF_{237}	—	October 24, 2009	Mount Lemmon	Mount Lemmon Survey	L4	10 km	MPC · JPL
474043	2016 GJ_{237}	—	November 2, 2007	Mount Lemmon	Mount Lemmon Survey	·	2.9 km	MPC · JPL
474044	2016 GG_{238}	—	February 15, 2010	Kitt Peak	Spacewatch	·	1.9 km	MPC · JPL
474045	2016 GK_{238}	—	March 10, 2007	Kitt Peak	Spacewatch	·	1.5 km	MPC · JPL
474046	2016 GV_{238}	—	November 6, 2010	Mount Lemmon	Mount Lemmon Survey	·	1 km	MPC · JPL
474047	2016 GP_{242}	—	March 9, 2002	Kitt Peak	Spacewatch	·	610 m	MPC · JPL
474048	2016 GU_{242}	—	May 16, 2005	Mount Lemmon	Mount Lemmon Survey	THB	3.3 km	MPC · JPL
474049	2016 GR_{243}	—	February 12, 2004	Kitt Peak	Spacewatch	HYG	3.5 km	MPC · JPL
474050	2016 GL_{244}	—	October 5, 2007	Kitt Peak	Spacewatch	VER	4.2 km	MPC · JPL
474051	2016 GU_{246}	—	October 18, 2009	Mount Lemmon	Mount Lemmon Survey	·	2.3 km	MPC · JPL
474052	2016 GJ_{249}	—	April 9, 1999	Kitt Peak	Spacewatch	·	1.3 km	MPC · JPL
474053	2016 GW_{250}	—	September 23, 2004	Kitt Peak	Spacewatch	·	1.7 km	MPC · JPL
474054	2016 HE_{1}	—	October 15, 1995	Kitt Peak	Spacewatch	·	1.5 km	MPC · JPL
474055	2016 HS_{1}	—	September 19, 2006	Kitt Peak	Spacewatch	·	1.3 km	MPC · JPL
474056	2016 HJ_{6}	—	November 25, 2009	Kitt Peak	Spacewatch	EUN	1.5 km	MPC · JPL
474057	2016 HF_{8}	—	March 2, 1997	Kitt Peak	Spacewatch	MAS	880 m	MPC · JPL
474058	2016 HL_{16}	—	January 15, 2005	Kitt Peak	Spacewatch	·	810 m	MPC · JPL
474059	2016 HY_{16}	—	May 8, 2005	Mount Lemmon	Mount Lemmon Survey	·	2.4 km	MPC · JPL
474060	2016 HB_{21}	—	March 23, 2006	Mount Lemmon	Mount Lemmon Survey	·	600 m	MPC · JPL
474061	2016 HE_{21}	—	January 10, 2008	Kitt Peak	Spacewatch	NYS	1.2 km	MPC · JPL
474062	2016 HU_{23}	—	March 18, 2010	Mount Lemmon	Mount Lemmon Survey	·	3.1 km	MPC · JPL
474063	2016 JH_{3}	—	October 22, 2005	Kitt Peak	Spacewatch	EUN	1.7 km	MPC · JPL
474064	2016 JM_{7}	—	October 23, 2009	Mount Lemmon	Mount Lemmon Survey	MAR	1.3 km	MPC · JPL
474065	2016 JJ_{10}	—	November 11, 2009	Mount Lemmon	Mount Lemmon Survey	·	2.0 km	MPC · JPL
474066	2016 JV_{11}	—	April 15, 2007	Kitt Peak	Spacewatch	·	2.3 km	MPC · JPL
474067	2016 JB_{12}	—	March 5, 2006	Kitt Peak	Spacewatch	H	450 m	MPC · JPL
474068	2016 JC_{16}	—	July 23, 2009	Siding Spring	SSS	MAS	790 m	MPC · JPL
474069	2016 JV_{18}	—	November 30, 2005	Mount Lemmon	Mount Lemmon Survey	(5)	1.2 km	MPC · JPL
474070	2016 JP_{20}	—	October 28, 2006	Mount Lemmon	Mount Lemmon Survey	·	1.1 km	MPC · JPL
474071	2016 JQ_{22}	—	August 22, 2004	Kitt Peak	Spacewatch	·	1.2 km	MPC · JPL
474072	2016 JD_{23}	—	February 2, 2006	Kitt Peak	Spacewatch	AGN	1.3 km	MPC · JPL
474073	2016 JF_{25}	—	April 25, 2003	Kitt Peak	Spacewatch	·	1.6 km	MPC · JPL
474074	2016 JO_{29}	—	August 30, 2005	Kitt Peak	Spacewatch	·	3.4 km	MPC · JPL
474075	2016 JS_{29}	—	September 21, 2003	Kitt Peak	Spacewatch	·	850 m	MPC · JPL
474076	2016 JN_{32}	—	October 25, 2005	Kitt Peak	Spacewatch	·	1.3 km	MPC · JPL
474077	2016 JP_{32}	—	July 14, 1999	Socorro	LINEAR	JUN	1.3 km	MPC · JPL
474078	2016 JZ_{34}	—	December 10, 2006	Kitt Peak	Spacewatch	H	720 m	MPC · JPL
474079	2016 JG_{35}	—	October 25, 2014	Mount Lemmon	Mount Lemmon Survey	·	2.6 km	MPC · JPL
474080	2016 JH_{35}	—	February 7, 1995	Siding Spring	R. H. McNaught	PHO	1.7 km	MPC · JPL
474081	2016 JN_{35}	—	September 29, 2006	Anderson Mesa	LONEOS	·	1.1 km	MPC · JPL
474082	2016 JW_{35}	—	November 18, 2009	Kitt Peak	Spacewatch	EUN	1.5 km	MPC · JPL
474083	2016 JZ_{35}	—	March 15, 2007	Mount Lemmon	Mount Lemmon Survey	RAF	1.0 km	MPC · JPL
474084	2016 JD_{36}	—	November 24, 2009	Kitt Peak	Spacewatch	·	2.4 km	MPC · JPL
474085	2016 JE_{36}	—	September 23, 2008	Mount Lemmon	Mount Lemmon Survey	DOR	2.2 km	MPC · JPL
474086	2016 JM_{36}	—	November 8, 2009	Kitt Peak	Spacewatch	·	2.1 km	MPC · JPL
474087	2016 JS_{36}	—	February 23, 2007	Kitt Peak	Spacewatch	·	1.6 km	MPC · JPL
474088	2016 KB_{2}	—	July 3, 2008	Siding Spring	SSS	·	1.9 km	MPC · JPL
474089	2016 KE_{2}	—	October 1, 2005	Mount Lemmon	Mount Lemmon Survey	·	1.4 km	MPC · JPL
474090	2016 KF_{2}	—	November 26, 2009	Kitt Peak	Spacewatch	·	1.6 km	MPC · JPL
474091	2016 KG_{2}	—	March 21, 2010	Mount Lemmon	Mount Lemmon Survey	·	2.7 km	MPC · JPL
474092	2016 KP_{2}	—	August 8, 2007	Socorro	LINEAR	·	2.2 km	MPC · JPL
474093	2016 KY_{3}	—	September 1, 2000	Socorro	LINEAR	·	1.4 km	MPC · JPL
474094	2016 LB_{4}	—	February 6, 2010	WISE	WISE	·	2.0 km	MPC · JPL
474095	2016 LE_{4}	—	September 21, 1995	Kitt Peak	Spacewatch	·	1.5 km	MPC · JPL
474096	2016 LR_{6}	—	May 22, 2003	Kitt Peak	Spacewatch	·	1.3 km	MPC · JPL
474097	2016 LA_{7}	—	February 10, 2010	Kitt Peak	Spacewatch	·	2.6 km	MPC · JPL
474098	2016 LE_{7}	—	July 4, 2010	WISE	WISE	·	4.0 km	MPC · JPL
474099	2016 LR_{7}	—	February 18, 2010	Kitt Peak	Spacewatch	·	1.7 km	MPC · JPL
474100	2016 LX_{7}	—	June 16, 2012	Mount Lemmon	Mount Lemmon Survey	EUN	1.0 km	MPC · JPL

== 474101–474200 ==
back to top

Designation			Discovery			Properties		Ref
Permanent	Provisional	Named after	Date	Site	Discoverer(s)	Category	Diam.	Ref
474101	2016 LE_{12}	—	August 30, 1998	Kitt Peak	Spacewatch	V	670 m	MPC · JPL
474102	2016 LL_{12}	—	September 26, 2006	Catalina	CSS	·	4.1 km	MPC · JPL
474103	2016 LH_{13}	—	April 1, 2008	Mount Lemmon	Mount Lemmon Survey	·	1.1 km	MPC · JPL
474104	2016 LB_{18}	—	August 2, 2010	WISE	WISE	·	2.7 km	MPC · JPL
474105	2016 LP_{19}	—	July 22, 2010	WISE	WISE	·	2.1 km	MPC · JPL
474106	2016 LZ_{23}	—	November 3, 2008	Mount Lemmon	Mount Lemmon Survey	·	2.3 km	MPC · JPL
474107	2016 LC_{24}	—	July 5, 2005	Mount Lemmon	Mount Lemmon Survey	·	3.3 km	MPC · JPL
474108	2016 LS_{25}	—	February 6, 2010	WISE	WISE	·	3.6 km	MPC · JPL
474109	2016 LB_{28}	—	March 31, 2009	Mount Lemmon	Mount Lemmon Survey	V	680 m	MPC · JPL
474110	2016 LL_{28}	—	January 26, 2010	WISE	WISE	·	3.6 km	MPC · JPL
474111	2016 LB_{30}	—	March 13, 2007	Mount Lemmon	Mount Lemmon Survey	·	1.2 km	MPC · JPL
474112	2016 LC_{30}	—	May 22, 2006	Kitt Peak	Spacewatch	·	710 m	MPC · JPL
474113	2016 LX_{31}	—	November 3, 1999	Kitt Peak	Spacewatch	·	2.4 km	MPC · JPL
474114	2016 LD_{41}	—	November 21, 2008	Mount Lemmon	Mount Lemmon Survey	·	4.5 km	MPC · JPL
474115	2016 LW_{41}	—	January 15, 2010	WISE	WISE	·	2.6 km	MPC · JPL
474116	2016 LR_{43}	—	May 24, 2000	Kitt Peak	Spacewatch	·	3.3 km	MPC · JPL
474117	2016 LS_{47}	—	August 29, 2006	Lulin	LUSS	·	3.7 km	MPC · JPL
474118	2016 LP_{50}	—	May 9, 2007	Kitt Peak	Spacewatch	·	1.8 km	MPC · JPL
474119	2016 LT_{50}	—	October 9, 2008	Mount Lemmon	Mount Lemmon Survey	EUN	1.3 km	MPC · JPL
474120	4504 P-L	—	September 24, 1960	Palomar	C. J. van Houten, I. van Houten-Groeneveld, T. Gehrels	·	2.8 km	MPC · JPL
474121	1993 TC_{8}	—	October 10, 1993	Kitt Peak	Spacewatch	·	1.6 km	MPC · JPL
474122	1994 RP_{24}	—	September 5, 1994	La Silla	E. W. Elst	·	1.4 km	MPC · JPL
474123	1995 BL_{14}	—	January 31, 1995	Kitt Peak	Spacewatch	·	1.5 km	MPC · JPL
474124	1995 MR_{4}	—	June 29, 1995	Kitt Peak	Spacewatch	·	940 m	MPC · JPL
474125	1995 QL_{8}	—	August 27, 1995	Kitt Peak	Spacewatch	·	1.7 km	MPC · JPL
474126	1995 QG_{13}	—	August 25, 1995	Kitt Peak	Spacewatch	EOS	1.4 km	MPC · JPL
474127	1995 QP_{13}	—	August 25, 1995	Kitt Peak	Spacewatch	EOS	1.7 km	MPC · JPL
474128	1995 SV_{28}	—	September 20, 1995	Kitt Peak	Spacewatch	(5)	1.1 km	MPC · JPL
474129	1995 SM_{30}	—	September 19, 1995	Kitt Peak	Spacewatch	·	1.0 km	MPC · JPL
474130	1995 SA_{41}	—	September 25, 1995	Kitt Peak	Spacewatch	·	1.8 km	MPC · JPL
474131	1995 SO_{44}	—	September 25, 1995	Kitt Peak	Spacewatch	·	550 m	MPC · JPL
474132	1995 SA_{45}	—	September 25, 1995	Kitt Peak	Spacewatch	·	1.1 km	MPC · JPL
474133	1995 SN_{61}	—	September 20, 1995	Kitt Peak	Spacewatch	·	540 m	MPC · JPL
474134	1995 SW_{63}	—	September 26, 1995	Kitt Peak	Spacewatch	EOS	1.7 km	MPC · JPL
474135	1995 SX_{73}	—	September 30, 1995	Kitt Peak	Spacewatch	·	1.1 km	MPC · JPL
474136	1995 SC_{75}	—	September 19, 1995	Kitt Peak	Spacewatch	·	1 km	MPC · JPL
474137	1995 TZ_{8}	—	October 1, 1995	Kitt Peak	Spacewatch	·	510 m	MPC · JPL
474138	1995 TF_{10}	—	October 2, 1995	Kitt Peak	Spacewatch	·	1.8 km	MPC · JPL
474139	1995 UH_{31}	—	September 22, 1995	Kitt Peak	Spacewatch	RAF	770 m	MPC · JPL
474140	1995 UQ_{52}	—	October 22, 1995	Kitt Peak	Spacewatch	·	2.3 km	MPC · JPL
474141	1995 XF_{4}	—	December 14, 1995	Kitt Peak	Spacewatch	·	1.8 km	MPC · JPL
474142	1996 XK_{35}	—	December 12, 1996	Kitt Peak	Spacewatch	·	680 m	MPC · JPL
474143	1997 MX_{6}	—	June 29, 1997	Kitt Peak	Spacewatch	H	650 m	MPC · JPL
474144	1997 UA	—	October 18, 1997	Kleť	Kleť	PHO	2.1 km	MPC · JPL
474145	1998 RD_{10}	—	September 13, 1998	Kitt Peak	Spacewatch	·	850 m	MPC · JPL
474146	1998 RF_{13}	—	September 14, 1998	Kitt Peak	Spacewatch	NYS	750 m	MPC · JPL
474147	1998 RF_{14}	—	September 14, 1998	Kitt Peak	Spacewatch	NYS	810 m	MPC · JPL
474148	1998 SA_{16}	—	September 16, 1998	Kitt Peak	Spacewatch	·	1.2 km	MPC · JPL
474149	1998 SW_{16}	—	September 17, 1998	Kitt Peak	Spacewatch	·	900 m	MPC · JPL
474150	1998 SQ_{34}	—	September 26, 1998	Socorro	LINEAR	·	2.0 km	MPC · JPL
474151	1998 SC_{151}	—	September 26, 1998	Socorro	LINEAR	·	1.5 km	MPC · JPL
474152	1998 SD_{174}	—	September 19, 1998	Apache Point	SDSS	·	1.3 km	MPC · JPL
474153	1998 TD_{20}	—	October 13, 1998	Kitt Peak	Spacewatch	·	1.9 km	MPC · JPL
474154	1998 UU_{50}	—	October 24, 1998	Kitt Peak	Spacewatch	·	920 m	MPC · JPL
474155	1998 WC_{36}	—	November 19, 1998	Kitt Peak	Spacewatch	·	830 m	MPC · JPL
474156	1998 XQ_{16}	—	December 12, 1998	Socorro	LINEAR	·	840 m	MPC · JPL
474157	1998 XL_{25}	—	December 13, 1998	Kitt Peak	Spacewatch	·	1.7 km	MPC · JPL
474158	1999 FA	—	March 16, 1999	Socorro	LINEAR	APO · PHA	260 m	MPC · JPL
474159	1999 RJ	—	September 3, 1999	Prescott	P. G. Comba	·	2.9 km	MPC · JPL
474160	1999 RH_{5}	—	September 3, 1999	Kitt Peak	Spacewatch	·	3.3 km	MPC · JPL
474161	1999 RH_{114}	—	September 5, 1999	Catalina	CSS	·	1.8 km	MPC · JPL
474162	1999 RQ_{128}	—	September 7, 1999	Socorro	LINEAR	·	1.5 km	MPC · JPL
474163	1999 SO_{5}	—	September 29, 1999	Catalina	CSS	AMO · APO · PHA · fast	240 m	MPC · JPL
474164	1999 TU_{53}	—	September 30, 1999	Kitt Peak	Spacewatch	·	1.3 km	MPC · JPL
474165	1999 TU_{61}	—	October 7, 1999	Kitt Peak	Spacewatch	·	1.0 km	MPC · JPL
474166	1999 TE_{65}	—	October 8, 1999	Kitt Peak	Spacewatch	·	540 m	MPC · JPL
474167	1999 TO_{68}	—	October 2, 1999	Kitt Peak	Spacewatch	EUN	1.2 km	MPC · JPL
474168	1999 TD_{80}	—	October 11, 1999	Kitt Peak	Spacewatch	·	3.3 km	MPC · JPL
474169	1999 TT_{87}	—	October 15, 1999	Kitt Peak	Spacewatch	·	1.3 km	MPC · JPL
474170	1999 TE_{167}	—	October 10, 1999	Socorro	LINEAR	·	1.4 km	MPC · JPL
474171	1999 TY_{193}	—	October 12, 1999	Socorro	LINEAR	·	1.3 km	MPC · JPL
474172	1999 TL_{226}	—	October 3, 1999	Kitt Peak	Spacewatch	·	520 m	MPC · JPL
474173	1999 TT_{262}	—	October 14, 1999	Kitt Peak	Spacewatch	THB	2.4 km	MPC · JPL
474174	1999 TV_{299}	—	October 2, 1999	Kitt Peak	Spacewatch	·	2.9 km	MPC · JPL
474175	1999 TG_{304}	—	October 4, 1999	Kitt Peak	Spacewatch	·	2.5 km	MPC · JPL
474176	1999 UW_{18}	—	October 11, 1999	Kitt Peak	Spacewatch	·	560 m	MPC · JPL
474177	1999 US_{36}	—	October 12, 1999	Kitt Peak	Spacewatch	·	1.3 km	MPC · JPL
474178	1999 UC_{41}	—	October 1, 1999	Catalina	CSS	·	710 m	MPC · JPL
474179	1999 VS_{6}	—	November 6, 1999	Socorro	LINEAR	APO	540 m	MPC · JPL
474180	1999 VA_{76}	—	November 5, 1999	Kitt Peak	Spacewatch	·	3.1 km	MPC · JPL
474181	1999 VP_{79}	—	November 4, 1999	Socorro	LINEAR	·	1.2 km	MPC · JPL
474182	1999 VK_{118}	—	November 9, 1999	Kitt Peak	Spacewatch	·	3.0 km	MPC · JPL
474183	1999 VD_{136}	—	October 12, 1999	Socorro	LINEAR	·	1.5 km	MPC · JPL
474184	1999 VH_{158}	—	November 3, 1999	Socorro	LINEAR	JUN	880 m	MPC · JPL
474185	1999 VP_{175}	—	November 11, 1999	Kitt Peak	Spacewatch	·	550 m	MPC · JPL
474186	1999 VO_{179}	—	October 10, 1999	Socorro	LINEAR	·	1.7 km	MPC · JPL
474187	1999 VS_{222}	—	November 5, 1999	Kitt Peak	Spacewatch	·	1.3 km	MPC · JPL
474188	1999 VL_{226}	—	November 1, 1999	Catalina	CSS	·	1.2 km	MPC · JPL
474189	1999 XW_{8}	—	December 5, 1999	Socorro	LINEAR	·	2.3 km	MPC · JPL
474190	1999 XX_{14}	—	December 6, 1999	Socorro	LINEAR	·	1.2 km	MPC · JPL
474191	1999 XN_{238}	—	December 4, 1999	Catalina	CSS	·	1.5 km	MPC · JPL
474192	1999 YS_{18}	—	December 29, 1999	Mauna Kea	Veillet, C.	·	1.0 km	MPC · JPL
474193	1999 YN_{25}	—	December 27, 1999	Kitt Peak	Spacewatch	·	1.6 km	MPC · JPL
474194	2000 AA_{131}	—	December 14, 1999	Socorro	LINEAR	·	1.6 km	MPC · JPL
474195	2000 AU_{216}	—	January 8, 2000	Kitt Peak	Spacewatch	·	1.7 km	MPC · JPL
474196	2000 AH_{221}	—	January 5, 2000	Kitt Peak	Spacewatch	·	1.0 km	MPC · JPL
474197	2000 BR_{9}	—	January 26, 2000	Kitt Peak	Spacewatch	·	500 m	MPC · JPL
474198	2000 CH_{55}	—	February 3, 2000	Socorro	LINEAR	JUN	1.1 km	MPC · JPL
474199	2000 CA_{141}	—	February 6, 2000	Kitt Peak	Spacewatch	V	610 m	MPC · JPL
474200	2000 DT_{17}	—	February 29, 2000	Socorro	LINEAR	·	2.3 km	MPC · JPL

== 474201–474300 ==
back to top

Designation			Discovery			Properties		Ref
Permanent	Provisional	Named after	Date	Site	Discoverer(s)	Category	Diam.	Ref
474201	2000 HV_{27}	—	April 28, 2000	Socorro	LINEAR	PHO	1.5 km	MPC · JPL
474202	2000 KO_{6}	—	May 27, 2000	Socorro	LINEAR	·	1.0 km	MPC · JPL
474203	2000 QR_{199}	—	August 29, 2000	Socorro	LINEAR	·	750 m	MPC · JPL
474204	2000 QE_{203}	—	August 29, 2000	Socorro	LINEAR	·	600 m	MPC · JPL
474205	2000 SJ_{35}	—	September 24, 2000	Socorro	LINEAR	·	650 m	MPC · JPL
474206	2000 SK_{95}	—	September 23, 2000	Socorro	LINEAR	·	2.0 km	MPC · JPL
474207	2000 SR_{159}	—	September 27, 2000	Kitt Peak	Spacewatch	THM	1.8 km	MPC · JPL
474208	2000 SJ_{298}	—	September 28, 2000	Socorro	LINEAR	·	630 m	MPC · JPL
474209	2000 SE_{302}	—	September 28, 2000	Socorro	LINEAR	·	2.5 km	MPC · JPL
474210	2000 SW_{309}	—	September 25, 2000	Socorro	LINEAR	·	3.1 km	MPC · JPL
474211	2000 SO_{320}	—	September 30, 2000	Kitt Peak	Spacewatch	·	970 m	MPC · JPL
474212	2000 SH_{344}	—	September 29, 2000	Mauna Kea	D. J. Tholen, Whiteley, R. J.	·	680 m	MPC · JPL
474213	2000 TT_{6}	—	October 1, 2000	Socorro	LINEAR	·	1.7 km	MPC · JPL
474214	2000 UA_{16}	—	September 26, 2000	Socorro	LINEAR	·	3.0 km	MPC · JPL
474215	2000 UD_{30}	—	October 2, 2000	Socorro	LINEAR	H	730 m	MPC · JPL
474216	2000 UF_{56}	—	September 27, 2000	Socorro	LINEAR	·	3.3 km	MPC · JPL
474217	2000 UO_{70}	—	October 25, 2000	Socorro	LINEAR	·	1.6 km	MPC · JPL
474218	2000 UW_{96}	—	October 25, 2000	Socorro	LINEAR	·	3.3 km	MPC · JPL
474219	2000 VT_{64}	—	November 3, 2000	Socorro	LINEAR	·	940 m	MPC · JPL
474220	2000 WM_{113}	—	November 20, 2000	Socorro	LINEAR	·	3.4 km	MPC · JPL
474221	2001 AX_{35}	—	January 5, 2001	Socorro	LINEAR	·	2.6 km	MPC · JPL
474222	2001 BO_{56}	—	January 19, 2001	Socorro	LINEAR	·	3.3 km	MPC · JPL
474223	2001 CC_{32}	—	February 12, 2001	Anderson Mesa	LONEOS	AMO	540 m	MPC · JPL
474224	2001 CR_{36}	—	February 1, 2001	Kitt Peak	Spacewatch	·	1.6 km	MPC · JPL
474225	2001 DB_{4}	—	February 16, 2001	Socorro	LINEAR	·	1.5 km	MPC · JPL
474226	2001 DQ_{6}	—	January 18, 2001	Socorro	LINEAR	PHO	1.0 km	MPC · JPL
474227	2001 DS_{89}	—	December 28, 2000	Socorro	LINEAR	·	2.6 km	MPC · JPL
474228	2001 DK_{108}	—	February 26, 2001	Cima Ekar	ADAS	·	2.0 km	MPC · JPL
474229	2001 FR_{107}	—	January 19, 2001	Kitt Peak	Spacewatch	·	910 m	MPC · JPL
474230	2001 FF_{220}	—	March 21, 2001	Kitt Peak	SKADS	·	730 m	MPC · JPL
474231	2001 HZ_{7}	—	April 21, 2001	Socorro	LINEAR	APO · PHA	350 m	MPC · JPL
474232	2001 PO_{53}	—	August 14, 2001	Palomar	NEAT	·	1.0 km	MPC · JPL
474233	2001 QV_{122}	—	August 19, 2001	Socorro	LINEAR	·	1.2 km	MPC · JPL
474234	2001 QM_{123}	—	August 19, 2001	Socorro	LINEAR	·	1.2 km	MPC · JPL
474235	2001 QC_{207}	—	August 23, 2001	Kitt Peak	Spacewatch	NYS	1.0 km	MPC · JPL
474236	2001 QW_{317}	—	August 20, 2001	Cerro Tololo	M. W. Buie	·	1.1 km	MPC · JPL
474237	2001 RN_{13}	—	September 10, 2001	Socorro	LINEAR	·	910 m	MPC · JPL
474238	2001 RU_{17}	—	September 11, 2001	Anderson Mesa	LONEOS	ATE	180 m	MPC · JPL
474239	2001 RH_{30}	—	September 7, 2001	Socorro	LINEAR	·	1.1 km	MPC · JPL
474240	2001 RK_{89}	—	September 11, 2001	Anderson Mesa	LONEOS	·	1.3 km	MPC · JPL
474241	2001 RX_{112}	—	September 12, 2001	Socorro	LINEAR	MAS	550 m	MPC · JPL
474242	2001 RJ_{131}	—	September 12, 2001	Socorro	LINEAR	V	690 m	MPC · JPL
474243	2001 ST_{5}	—	September 16, 2001	Socorro	LINEAR	H	500 m	MPC · JPL
474244	2001 ST_{16}	—	September 16, 2001	Socorro	LINEAR	·	1.0 km	MPC · JPL
474245	2001 SY_{17}	—	September 16, 2001	Socorro	LINEAR	NYS	1.0 km	MPC · JPL
474246	2001 SK_{27}	—	September 16, 2001	Socorro	LINEAR	·	970 m	MPC · JPL
474247	2001 SH_{61}	—	September 17, 2001	Socorro	LINEAR	·	1.5 km	MPC · JPL
474248	2001 SR_{103}	—	September 12, 2001	Kitt Peak	Spacewatch	·	1.7 km	MPC · JPL
474249	2001 SU_{113}	—	September 20, 2001	Desert Eagle	W. K. Y. Yeung	H	410 m	MPC · JPL
474250	2001 SC_{130}	—	September 16, 2001	Socorro	LINEAR	ERI	1.4 km	MPC · JPL
474251	2001 SL_{156}	—	August 27, 2001	Anderson Mesa	LONEOS	·	1.2 km	MPC · JPL
474252	2001 SO_{196}	—	September 19, 2001	Socorro	LINEAR	·	930 m	MPC · JPL
474253	2001 SH_{217}	—	September 19, 2001	Socorro	LINEAR	NYS	1 km	MPC · JPL
474254	2001 SE_{231}	—	September 19, 2001	Socorro	LINEAR	·	970 m	MPC · JPL
474255	2001 ST_{244}	—	September 19, 2001	Socorro	LINEAR	·	1.3 km	MPC · JPL
474256	2001 SK_{255}	—	September 19, 2001	Socorro	LINEAR	·	1.2 km	MPC · JPL
474257	2001 SR_{275}	—	September 21, 2001	Kitt Peak	Spacewatch	·	1.1 km	MPC · JPL
474258	2001 SG_{285}	—	September 20, 2001	Socorro	LINEAR	·	1.0 km	MPC · JPL
474259	2001 SV_{307}	—	September 21, 2001	Socorro	LINEAR	·	1.0 km	MPC · JPL
474260	2001 SA_{321}	—	September 23, 2001	Socorro	LINEAR	·	1.6 km	MPC · JPL
474261	2001 SQ_{326}	—	September 18, 2001	Anderson Mesa	LONEOS	·	910 m	MPC · JPL
474262	2001 SC_{331}	—	September 19, 2001	Socorro	LINEAR	·	840 m	MPC · JPL
474263	2001 TO_{46}	—	October 15, 2001	Socorro	LINEAR	·	1.7 km	MPC · JPL
474264	2001 TV_{84}	—	October 14, 2001	Socorro	LINEAR	·	900 m	MPC · JPL
474265	2001 TV_{112}	—	October 14, 2001	Socorro	LINEAR	·	1.9 km	MPC · JPL
474266	2001 TL_{120}	—	October 15, 2001	Socorro	LINEAR	·	1.8 km	MPC · JPL
474267	2001 TY_{155}	—	October 14, 2001	Kitt Peak	Spacewatch	·	1.6 km	MPC · JPL
474268	2001 TK_{157}	—	October 14, 2001	Kitt Peak	Spacewatch	·	1.0 km	MPC · JPL
474269	2001 TT_{160}	—	October 15, 2001	Kitt Peak	Spacewatch	·	2.6 km	MPC · JPL
474270	2001 TQ_{179}	—	October 14, 2001	Socorro	LINEAR	·	1.9 km	MPC · JPL
474271	2001 TS_{183}	—	October 14, 2001	Socorro	LINEAR	·	1.5 km	MPC · JPL
474272	2001 TR_{188}	—	October 14, 2001	Socorro	LINEAR	·	1.1 km	MPC · JPL
474273	2001 TT_{193}	—	October 15, 2001	Socorro	LINEAR	·	910 m	MPC · JPL
474274	2001 TY_{207}	—	October 11, 2001	Palomar	NEAT	MAS	520 m	MPC · JPL
474275	2001 TL_{251}	—	October 14, 2001	Apache Point	SDSS	·	1.1 km	MPC · JPL
474276	2001 TQ_{257}	—	October 7, 2001	Palomar	NEAT	·	1.6 km	MPC · JPL
474277	2001 UD_{1}	—	October 17, 2001	Socorro	LINEAR	·	2.8 km	MPC · JPL
474278	2001 UT_{17}	—	October 26, 2001	Haleakala	NEAT	·	410 m	MPC · JPL
474279	2001 UK_{31}	—	October 16, 2001	Socorro	LINEAR	MAS · fast	790 m	MPC · JPL
474280	2001 UM_{40}	—	October 17, 2001	Socorro	LINEAR	NYS	1.2 km	MPC · JPL
474281	2001 UQ_{49}	—	October 17, 2001	Socorro	LINEAR	·	1.3 km	MPC · JPL
474282	2001 UV_{55}	—	October 17, 2001	Socorro	LINEAR	NYS	1.0 km	MPC · JPL
474283	2001 UM_{106}	—	October 20, 2001	Socorro	LINEAR	NYS	1.0 km	MPC · JPL
474284	2001 UY_{225}	—	October 16, 2001	Palomar	NEAT	·	1.0 km	MPC · JPL
474285	2001 UC_{230}	—	October 18, 2001	Palomar	NEAT	·	1 km	MPC · JPL
474286	2001 VG_{79}	—	November 9, 2001	Palomar	NEAT	·	1.2 km	MPC · JPL
474287	2001 WD_{26}	—	November 17, 2001	Socorro	LINEAR	·	1.0 km	MPC · JPL
474288	2001 WE_{62}	—	November 19, 2001	Socorro	LINEAR	NYS	960 m	MPC · JPL
474289	2001 WC_{86}	—	November 20, 2001	Socorro	LINEAR	EOS	2.0 km	MPC · JPL
474290	2001 WH_{86}	—	November 20, 2001	Socorro	LINEAR	MAS	700 m	MPC · JPL
474291	2001 WA_{88}	—	November 19, 2001	Socorro	LINEAR	·	2.3 km	MPC · JPL
474292	2001 WL_{100}	—	November 16, 2001	Kitt Peak	Spacewatch	·	1.0 km	MPC · JPL
474293	2001 WR_{101}	—	November 17, 2001	Kitt Peak	Spacewatch	·	940 m	MPC · JPL
474294	2001 XC_{1}	—	December 7, 2001	Socorro	LINEAR	H	400 m	MPC · JPL
474295	2001 XX_{10}	—	December 11, 2001	Socorro	LINEAR	·	710 m	MPC · JPL
474296	2001 XX_{27}	—	December 10, 2001	Socorro	LINEAR	·	3.8 km	MPC · JPL
474297	2001 XD_{32}	—	November 20, 2001	Socorro	LINEAR	·	1.1 km	MPC · JPL
474298	2001 XN_{122}	—	December 14, 2001	Socorro	LINEAR	MAS	800 m	MPC · JPL
474299	2001 XM_{124}	—	December 14, 2001	Socorro	LINEAR	·	1.3 km	MPC · JPL
474300	2001 XS_{128}	—	November 20, 2001	Socorro	LINEAR	·	1.1 km	MPC · JPL

== 474301–474400 ==
back to top

Designation			Discovery			Properties		Ref
Permanent	Provisional	Named after	Date	Site	Discoverer(s)	Category	Diam.	Ref
474301	2001 XM_{187}	—	December 14, 2001	Socorro	LINEAR	·	1.5 km	MPC · JPL
474302	2001 XK_{229}	—	December 15, 2001	Socorro	LINEAR	·	930 m	MPC · JPL
474303	2001 XL_{248}	—	December 14, 2001	Kitt Peak	Spacewatch	EOS	2.1 km	MPC · JPL
474304	2001 XN_{253}	—	December 22, 1995	Kitt Peak	Spacewatch	·	3.1 km	MPC · JPL
474305	2001 YN_{15}	—	December 14, 2001	Socorro	LINEAR	EOS	2.5 km	MPC · JPL
474306	2001 YT_{31}	—	November 20, 2001	Socorro	LINEAR	3:2 · SHU	5.0 km	MPC · JPL
474307	2001 YR_{57}	—	December 18, 2001	Socorro	LINEAR	·	1.8 km	MPC · JPL
474308	2001 YX_{156}	—	December 17, 2001	Socorro	LINEAR	·	2.8 km	MPC · JPL
474309	2002 AB_{26}	—	January 8, 2002	Kitt Peak	Spacewatch	·	3.8 km	MPC · JPL
474310	2002 AN_{50}	—	January 9, 2002	Socorro	LINEAR	·	1.8 km	MPC · JPL
474311	2002 AG_{65}	—	January 11, 2002	Socorro	LINEAR	·	1.8 km	MPC · JPL
474312	2002 AW_{139}	—	January 13, 2002	Socorro	LINEAR	PHO	940 m	MPC · JPL
474313	2002 AO_{142}	—	January 13, 2002	Socorro	LINEAR	·	3.2 km	MPC · JPL
474314	2002 AQ_{172}	—	January 14, 2002	Socorro	LINEAR	·	3.1 km	MPC · JPL
474315	2002 AT_{172}	—	January 14, 2002	Socorro	LINEAR	·	2.3 km	MPC · JPL
474316	2002 BK_{28}	—	January 21, 2002	Kitt Peak	Spacewatch	·	2.2 km	MPC · JPL
474317	2002 CX_{54}	—	January 13, 2002	Kitt Peak	Spacewatch	·	3.4 km	MPC · JPL
474318	2002 CB_{72}	—	February 7, 2002	Socorro	LINEAR	·	2.0 km	MPC · JPL
474319	2002 CQ_{187}	—	January 22, 2002	Kitt Peak	Spacewatch	·	2.4 km	MPC · JPL
474320	2002 CQ_{204}	—	February 7, 2002	Kitt Peak	Spacewatch	·	2.8 km	MPC · JPL
474321	2002 CK_{218}	—	February 10, 2002	Socorro	LINEAR	·	3.5 km	MPC · JPL
474322	2002 CH_{229}	—	January 22, 2002	Kitt Peak	Spacewatch	·	2.4 km	MPC · JPL
474323	2002 CE_{258}	—	January 21, 2002	Kitt Peak	Spacewatch	·	980 m	MPC · JPL
474324	2002 CY_{261}	—	January 14, 2002	Socorro	LINEAR	·	2.1 km	MPC · JPL
474325	2002 CS_{286}	—	January 20, 2002	Kitt Peak	Spacewatch	·	1.2 km	MPC · JPL
474326	2002 CJ_{297}	—	January 22, 2002	Kitt Peak	Spacewatch	·	2.6 km	MPC · JPL
474327	2002 DV_{18}	—	February 19, 2002	Socorro	LINEAR	·	2.0 km	MPC · JPL
474328	2002 EK_{4}	—	March 10, 2002	Cima Ekar	ADAS	EUN	1.1 km	MPC · JPL
474329	2002 ET_{25}	—	February 10, 2002	Socorro	LINEAR	EUN	1.3 km	MPC · JPL
474330	2002 ED_{90}	—	February 11, 2002	Socorro	LINEAR	T_{j} (2.99)	4.0 km	MPC · JPL
474331	2002 EE_{141}	—	March 12, 2002	Palomar	NEAT	·	1.5 km	MPC · JPL
474332	2002 FC_{30}	—	March 20, 2002	Palomar	NEAT	·	1.7 km	MPC · JPL
474333	2002 GU_{9}	—	April 14, 2002	Socorro	LINEAR	H	430 m	MPC · JPL
474334	2002 GZ_{64}	—	April 8, 2002	Palomar	NEAT	·	1.5 km	MPC · JPL
474335	2002 GK_{65}	—	April 8, 2002	Kitt Peak	Spacewatch	·	1.5 km	MPC · JPL
474336	2002 GG_{71}	—	April 9, 2002	Anderson Mesa	LONEOS	·	1.5 km	MPC · JPL
474337	2002 HM_{6}	—	April 10, 2002	Socorro	LINEAR	·	1.5 km	MPC · JPL
474338	2002 JT_{56}	—	May 9, 2002	Socorro	LINEAR	H	640 m	MPC · JPL
474339	2002 NH_{64}	—	July 8, 2002	Palomar	NEAT	·	1.4 km	MPC · JPL
474340	2002 OM_{5}	—	July 19, 2002	Palomar	NEAT	·	1.8 km	MPC · JPL
474341	2002 ON_{32}	—	July 17, 2002	Palomar	NEAT	·	1.8 km	MPC · JPL
474342	2002 OL_{33}	—	July 17, 2002	Palomar	NEAT	·	550 m	MPC · JPL
474343	2002 PJ	—	August 1, 2002	Campo Imperatore	CINEOS	·	2.8 km	MPC · JPL
474344	2002 PO_{80}	—	August 11, 2002	Palomar	NEAT	·	850 m	MPC · JPL
474345	2002 PQ_{173}	—	August 8, 2002	Palomar	NEAT	·	630 m	MPC · JPL
474346	2002 PH_{185}	—	August 8, 2002	Palomar	NEAT	·	2.4 km	MPC · JPL
474347	2002 PH_{187}	—	August 11, 2002	Palomar	NEAT	·	830 m	MPC · JPL
474348	2002 QR_{3}	—	August 16, 2002	Palomar	NEAT	·	580 m	MPC · JPL
474349	2002 QG_{27}	—	August 28, 2002	Palomar	NEAT	·	620 m	MPC · JPL
474350	2002 QN_{52}	—	August 29, 2002	Palomar	S. F. Hönig	·	460 m	MPC · JPL
474351	2002 QT_{55}	—	August 29, 2002	Palomar	S. F. Hönig	DOR	2.1 km	MPC · JPL
474352	2002 QH_{63}	—	August 17, 2002	Palomar	NEAT	AEO	1.0 km	MPC · JPL
474353	2002 QC_{68}	—	August 18, 2002	Palomar	NEAT	·	470 m	MPC · JPL
474354	2002 QK_{71}	—	August 17, 2002	Palomar	NEAT	·	670 m	MPC · JPL
474355	2002 QV_{88}	—	August 27, 2002	Palomar	NEAT	·	540 m	MPC · JPL
474356	2002 QO_{95}	—	August 18, 2002	Palomar	NEAT	·	1.7 km	MPC · JPL
474357	2002 QU_{106}	—	August 17, 2002	Palomar	NEAT	·	1.7 km	MPC · JPL
474358	2002 QO_{111}	—	August 16, 2002	Palomar	NEAT	NEM	2.1 km	MPC · JPL
474359	2002 QX_{111}	—	August 31, 2002	Palomar	NEAT	·	1.6 km	MPC · JPL
474360	2002 QV_{121}	—	August 16, 2002	Palomar	NEAT	·	600 m	MPC · JPL
474361	2002 QJ_{124}	—	August 16, 2002	Palomar	NEAT	·	630 m	MPC · JPL
474362	2002 QN_{127}	—	August 18, 2002	Palomar	NEAT	·	560 m	MPC · JPL
474363	2002 QZ_{131}	—	August 18, 2002	Palomar	NEAT	·	650 m	MPC · JPL
474364	2002 RJ_{16}	—	September 4, 2002	Anderson Mesa	LONEOS	·	770 m	MPC · JPL
474365	2002 RR_{58}	—	September 5, 2002	Anderson Mesa	LONEOS	·	800 m	MPC · JPL
474366	2002 RO_{85}	—	September 5, 2002	Socorro	LINEAR	·	740 m	MPC · JPL
474367	2002 RA_{116}	—	September 6, 2002	Socorro	LINEAR	·	2.0 km	MPC · JPL
474368	2002 RQ_{138}	—	September 10, 2002	Palomar	NEAT	PHO	1.9 km	MPC · JPL
474369	2002 RJ_{142}	—	September 11, 2002	Palomar	NEAT	DOR	2.2 km	MPC · JPL
474370	2002 RT_{157}	—	September 11, 2002	Palomar	NEAT	·	1.3 km	MPC · JPL
474371	2002 RL_{177}	—	September 13, 2002	Palomar	NEAT	·	680 m	MPC · JPL
474372	2002 RE_{207}	—	September 14, 2002	Palomar	NEAT	DOR	2.2 km	MPC · JPL
474373	2002 RB_{235}	—	September 11, 2002	Palomar	White, M., M. Collins	·	590 m	MPC · JPL
474374	2002 RP_{254}	—	September 14, 2002	Palomar	NEAT	AEO	850 m	MPC · JPL
474375	2002 RK_{261}	—	September 11, 2002	Palomar	NEAT	(2076)	550 m	MPC · JPL
474376	2002 RJ_{269}	—	September 14, 2002	Palomar	NEAT	·	1.2 km	MPC · JPL
474377	2002 RE_{270}	—	September 4, 2002	Palomar	NEAT	·	590 m	MPC · JPL
474378	2002 RT_{279}	—	September 14, 2002	Palomar	NEAT	V	470 m	MPC · JPL
474379	2002 SK_{25}	—	September 28, 2002	Haleakala	NEAT	PHO	2.0 km	MPC · JPL
474380	2002 SK_{26}	—	September 29, 2002	Haleakala	NEAT	·	700 m	MPC · JPL
474381	2002 SW_{59}	—	September 16, 2002	Haleakala	NEAT	·	2.2 km	MPC · JPL
474382	2002 SX_{69}	—	September 26, 2002	Palomar	NEAT	·	420 m	MPC · JPL
474383	2002 SN_{70}	—	September 26, 2002	Palomar	NEAT	·	1.8 km	MPC · JPL
474384	2002 TB_{22}	—	October 2, 2002	Socorro	LINEAR	·	2.4 km	MPC · JPL
474385	2002 TC_{43}	—	October 2, 2002	Socorro	LINEAR	·	2.1 km	MPC · JPL
474386	2002 TT_{60}	—	October 5, 2002	Palomar	NEAT	·	1.2 km	MPC · JPL
474387	2002 TJ_{120}	—	October 3, 2002	Palomar	NEAT	·	1.7 km	MPC · JPL
474388	2002 TC_{124}	—	October 4, 2002	Palomar	NEAT	·	1.5 km	MPC · JPL
474389	2002 TP_{131}	—	October 4, 2002	Socorro	LINEAR	·	700 m	MPC · JPL
474390	2002 TS_{141}	—	October 5, 2002	Palomar	NEAT	·	3.0 km	MPC · JPL
474391	2002 TC_{151}	—	October 5, 2002	Palomar	NEAT	·	1.7 km	MPC · JPL
474392	2002 TF_{157}	—	October 5, 2002	Palomar	NEAT	·	880 m	MPC · JPL
474393	2002 TU_{190}	—	October 1, 2002	Socorro	LINEAR	·	2.4 km	MPC · JPL
474394	2002 TK_{224}	—	October 3, 2002	Socorro	LINEAR	·	2.2 km	MPC · JPL
474395	2002 TB_{233}	—	October 6, 2002	Socorro	LINEAR	·	1.4 km	MPC · JPL
474396	2002 TZ_{325}	—	October 5, 2002	Apache Point	SDSS	·	660 m	MPC · JPL
474397	2002 TK_{327}	—	October 5, 2002	Apache Point	SDSS	·	2.0 km	MPC · JPL
474398	2002 TO_{340}	—	October 5, 2002	Apache Point	SDSS	·	1.7 km	MPC · JPL
474399	2002 TB_{368}	—	October 10, 2002	Apache Point	SDSS	·	1.5 km	MPC · JPL
474400	2002 UF_{13}	—	October 28, 2002	Haleakala	NEAT	·	2.3 km	MPC · JPL

== 474401–474500 ==
back to top

Designation			Discovery			Properties		Ref
Permanent	Provisional	Named after	Date	Site	Discoverer(s)	Category	Diam.	Ref
474401	2002 UY_{13}	—	October 29, 2002	Palomar	NEAT	·	460 m	MPC · JPL
474402	2002 UG_{22}	—	October 30, 2002	Haleakala	NEAT	DOR	2.3 km	MPC · JPL
474403	2002 UH_{23}	—	October 30, 2002	Palomar	NEAT	PHO	1.1 km	MPC · JPL
474404	2002 UY_{31}	—	October 5, 2002	Socorro	LINEAR	·	760 m	MPC · JPL
474405	2002 UX_{41}	—	October 11, 2002	Socorro	LINEAR	H	650 m	MPC · JPL
474406	2002 VH_{8}	—	October 10, 2002	Socorro	LINEAR	·	2.8 km	MPC · JPL
474407	2002 VF_{65}	—	November 7, 2002	Socorro	LINEAR	·	840 m	MPC · JPL
474408	2002 VR_{92}	—	November 11, 2002	Socorro	LINEAR	·	710 m	MPC · JPL
474409	2002 VM_{126}	—	November 12, 2002	Socorro	LINEAR	·	840 m	MPC · JPL
474410	2002 VY_{143}	—	November 4, 2002	Palomar	NEAT	·	2.1 km	MPC · JPL
474411	2002 VH_{145}	—	November 4, 2002	Palomar	NEAT	·	670 m	MPC · JPL
474412	2002 WT	—	November 20, 2002	Socorro	LINEAR	·	1.5 km	MPC · JPL
474413	2002 WU_{6}	—	November 24, 2002	Palomar	NEAT	H	630 m	MPC · JPL
474414	2002 WY_{8}	—	November 24, 2002	Palomar	NEAT	·	1.2 km	MPC · JPL
474415	2002 WY_{26}	—	November 22, 2002	Palomar	NEAT	·	550 m	MPC · JPL
474416	2002 WJ_{28}	—	November 16, 2002	Palomar	NEAT	·	2.7 km	MPC · JPL
474417	2002 XS_{1}	—	December 1, 2002	Socorro	LINEAR	·	900 m	MPC · JPL
474418	2002 XZ_{37}	—	December 6, 2002	Socorro	LINEAR	·	2.0 km	MPC · JPL
474419	2002 XO_{38}	—	December 7, 2002	Socorro	LINEAR	·	1.5 km	MPC · JPL
474420	2002 XT_{72}	—	November 18, 1995	Kitt Peak	Spacewatch	·	760 m	MPC · JPL
474421	2002 XR_{117}	—	December 10, 2002	Palomar	NEAT	·	750 m	MPC · JPL
474422	2002 XX_{117}	—	December 10, 2002	Palomar	NEAT	·	760 m	MPC · JPL
474423	2002 XD_{120}	—	December 3, 2002	Palomar	NEAT	NYS	630 m	MPC · JPL
474424	2002 YZ_{1}	—	December 27, 2002	Socorro	LINEAR	·	1.1 km	MPC · JPL
474425	2002 YF_{4}	—	December 27, 2002	Socorro	LINEAR	AMO	360 m	MPC · JPL
474426	2003 AV_{80}	—	January 12, 2003	Socorro	LINEAR	·	1.5 km	MPC · JPL
474427	2003 BR_{11}	—	January 26, 2003	Anderson Mesa	LONEOS	PHO	1.1 km	MPC · JPL
474428	2003 DC_{10}	—	February 23, 2003	Socorro	LINEAR	PHO	940 m	MPC · JPL
474429	2003 ER_{13}	—	March 6, 2003	Palomar	NEAT	·	2.1 km	MPC · JPL
474430	2003 EC_{29}	—	March 6, 2003	Socorro	LINEAR	·	1.2 km	MPC · JPL
474431	2003 FT_{130}	—	March 29, 2003	Anderson Mesa	LONEOS	·	3.7 km	MPC · JPL
474432	2003 FF_{133}	—	March 26, 2003	Kitt Peak	Spacewatch	·	2.4 km	MPC · JPL
474433	2003 GJ_{2}	—	April 1, 2003	Palomar	NEAT	·	3.2 km	MPC · JPL
474434	2003 GS_{26}	—	April 4, 2003	Kitt Peak	Spacewatch	·	3.0 km	MPC · JPL
474435	2003 GB_{32}	—	April 3, 2003	Anderson Mesa	LONEOS	THB	3.2 km	MPC · JPL
474436	2003 GF_{53}	—	March 26, 2003	Kitt Peak	Spacewatch	·	1.8 km	MPC · JPL
474437	2003 GZ_{56}	—	April 5, 2003	Kitt Peak	Spacewatch	·	2.6 km	MPC · JPL
474438	2003 HU_{23}	—	April 25, 2003	Kitt Peak	Spacewatch	H	370 m	MPC · JPL
474439	2003 HK_{52}	—	April 30, 2003	Haleakala	NEAT	T_{j} (2.94)	3.9 km	MPC · JPL
474440 Nemesnagyágnes	2003 NH_{5}	Nemesnagyágnes	July 5, 2003	Piszkéstető	K. Sárneczky, B. Sipőcz	·	880 m	MPC · JPL
474441	2003 OE_{13}	—	July 26, 2003	Campo Imperatore	CINEOS	·	1.4 km	MPC · JPL
474442	2003 PQ_{9}	—	August 1, 2003	Socorro	LINEAR	·	1.2 km	MPC · JPL
474443	2003 QJ_{5}	—	August 21, 2003	Socorro	LINEAR	·	1.4 km	MPC · JPL
474444	2003 QD_{14}	—	August 20, 2003	Palomar	NEAT	·	1.5 km	MPC · JPL
474445	2003 QO_{76}	—	August 4, 2003	Socorro	LINEAR	·	1.4 km	MPC · JPL
474446	2003 QH_{99}	—	August 21, 2003	Campo Imperatore	CINEOS	·	1.3 km	MPC · JPL
474447	2003 QL_{109}	—	August 31, 2003	Socorro	LINEAR	·	1.4 km	MPC · JPL
474448	2003 QN_{109}	—	August 31, 2003	Socorro	LINEAR	·	2.6 km	MPC · JPL
474449	2003 RU_{20}	—	September 15, 2003	Anderson Mesa	LONEOS	(1547)	1.9 km	MPC · JPL
474450	2003 SU_{10}	—	September 17, 2003	Kitt Peak	Spacewatch	·	610 m	MPC · JPL
474451	2003 SR_{15}	—	September 18, 2003	Socorro	LINEAR	APO	160 m	MPC · JPL
474452	2003 SF_{31}	—	September 18, 2003	Kitt Peak	Spacewatch	H	500 m	MPC · JPL
474453	2003 SY_{36}	—	September 19, 2003	Desert Eagle	W. K. Y. Yeung	ADE	2.2 km	MPC · JPL
474454	2003 SU_{41}	—	September 16, 2003	Palomar	NEAT	·	2.1 km	MPC · JPL
474455	2003 SL_{53}	—	September 16, 2003	Kitt Peak	Spacewatch	·	1.5 km	MPC · JPL
474456	2003 SH_{55}	—	September 16, 2003	Anderson Mesa	LONEOS	·	1.3 km	MPC · JPL
474457	2003 SS_{57}	—	August 25, 2003	Socorro	LINEAR	·	1.8 km	MPC · JPL
474458	2003 SF_{61}	—	September 17, 2003	Socorro	LINEAR	·	1.5 km	MPC · JPL
474459	2003 SK_{77}	—	September 19, 2003	Kitt Peak	Spacewatch	·	1.2 km	MPC · JPL
474460	2003 SA_{82}	—	September 17, 2003	Kitt Peak	Spacewatch	(5)	1.3 km	MPC · JPL
474461	2003 SP_{85}	—	September 16, 2003	Palomar	NEAT	JUN	1.3 km	MPC · JPL
474462	2003 SR_{94}	—	September 19, 2003	Kitt Peak	Spacewatch	·	810 m	MPC · JPL
474463	2003 SG_{105}	—	September 20, 2003	Kitt Peak	Spacewatch	·	1.1 km	MPC · JPL
474464	2003 SE_{108}	—	September 20, 2003	Palomar	NEAT	·	1.7 km	MPC · JPL
474465	2003 SB_{133}	—	September 19, 2003	Kitt Peak	Spacewatch	·	1.4 km	MPC · JPL
474466	2003 SJ_{160}	—	September 22, 2003	Kitt Peak	Spacewatch	·	690 m	MPC · JPL
474467	2003 SJ_{174}	—	September 18, 2003	Kitt Peak	Spacewatch	·	1.7 km	MPC · JPL
474468	2003 SX_{183}	—	September 21, 2003	Kitt Peak	Spacewatch	·	1.1 km	MPC · JPL
474469	2003 SW_{197}	—	September 22, 2003	Anderson Mesa	LONEOS	·	1.5 km	MPC · JPL
474470	2003 SA_{201}	—	September 25, 2003	Kleť	J. Tichá, M. Tichý	·	1.4 km	MPC · JPL
474471	2003 SS_{206}	—	September 26, 2003	Socorro	LINEAR	·	1.9 km	MPC · JPL
474472	2003 SH_{211}	—	September 24, 2003	Palomar	NEAT	·	1.5 km	MPC · JPL
474473	2003 SE_{215}	—	September 18, 2003	Kitt Peak	Spacewatch	H	540 m	MPC · JPL
474474	2003 SJ_{215}	—	September 28, 2003	Kitt Peak	Spacewatch	AMO	420 m	MPC · JPL
474475	2003 SA_{221}	—	September 6, 2003	Campo Imperatore	CINEOS	·	1.4 km	MPC · JPL
474476	2003 SB_{235}	—	September 26, 2003	Socorro	LINEAR	·	1.2 km	MPC · JPL
474477	2003 SD_{243}	—	September 28, 2003	Kitt Peak	Spacewatch	·	1.2 km	MPC · JPL
474478	2003 SA_{251}	—	September 26, 2003	Socorro	LINEAR	H	490 m	MPC · JPL
474479	2003 SA_{276}	—	September 29, 2003	Kitt Peak	Spacewatch	·	1.4 km	MPC · JPL
474480	2003 SB_{288}	—	September 30, 2003	Kitt Peak	Spacewatch	·	570 m	MPC · JPL
474481	2003 SY_{299}	—	September 16, 2003	Kitt Peak	Spacewatch	·	1.3 km	MPC · JPL
474482	2003 SP_{321}	—	September 21, 2003	Kitt Peak	Spacewatch	·	1.6 km	MPC · JPL
474483	2003 SL_{323}	—	September 16, 2003	Kitt Peak	Spacewatch	·	1.0 km	MPC · JPL
474484	2003 SA_{324}	—	September 16, 2003	Kitt Peak	Spacewatch	·	490 m	MPC · JPL
474485	2003 SD_{324}	—	September 16, 2003	Kitt Peak	Spacewatch	·	610 m	MPC · JPL
474486	2003 SB_{330}	—	September 26, 2003	Apache Point	SDSS	·	1.3 km	MPC · JPL
474487	2003 SL_{337}	—	September 16, 2003	Kitt Peak	Spacewatch	WIT	790 m	MPC · JPL
474488	2003 SW_{337}	—	September 18, 2003	Campo Imperatore	CINEOS	·	1.3 km	MPC · JPL
474489	2003 SU_{338}	—	September 26, 2003	Apache Point	SDSS	·	1.0 km	MPC · JPL
474490	2003 SQ_{366}	—	September 16, 2003	Kitt Peak	Spacewatch	·	1.5 km	MPC · JPL
474491	2003 SM_{369}	—	September 26, 2003	Apache Point	SDSS	·	1.4 km	MPC · JPL
474492	2003 SC_{402}	—	September 26, 2003	Apache Point	SDSS	·	1.4 km	MPC · JPL
474493	2003 TR_{4}	—	September 19, 2003	Kitt Peak	Spacewatch	·	1.4 km	MPC · JPL
474494	2003 TP_{55}	—	October 5, 2003	Kitt Peak	Spacewatch	·	1.6 km	MPC · JPL
474495	2003 UH_{4}	—	October 16, 2003	Mülheim-Ruhr	Mulheim-Ruhr	JUN	850 m	MPC · JPL
474496	2003 UX_{9}	—	October 19, 2003	Kitt Peak	Spacewatch	ADE	2.1 km	MPC · JPL
474497	2003 UU_{32}	—	October 16, 2003	Kitt Peak	Spacewatch	·	1.5 km	MPC · JPL
474498	2003 UJ_{42}	—	October 17, 2003	Kitt Peak	Spacewatch	·	1.6 km	MPC · JPL
474499	2003 UU_{47}	—	October 21, 2003	Socorro	LINEAR	H	480 m	MPC · JPL
474500	2003 UC_{49}	—	October 16, 2003	Anderson Mesa	LONEOS	·	1.5 km	MPC · JPL

== 474501–474600 ==
back to top

Designation			Discovery			Properties		Ref
Permanent	Provisional	Named after	Date	Site	Discoverer(s)	Category	Diam.	Ref
474501	2003 UN_{53}	—	October 18, 2003	Palomar	NEAT	·	2.0 km	MPC · JPL
474502	2003 UN_{59}	—	October 17, 2003	Anderson Mesa	LONEOS	·	1.5 km	MPC · JPL
474503	2003 UA_{60}	—	October 17, 2003	Anderson Mesa	LONEOS	·	1.6 km	MPC · JPL
474504	2003 UM_{75}	—	October 17, 2003	Anderson Mesa	LONEOS	·	1.4 km	MPC · JPL
474505	2003 UE_{76}	—	October 17, 2003	Palomar	NEAT	·	1.8 km	MPC · JPL
474506	2003 UP_{80}	—	October 5, 2003	Kitt Peak	Spacewatch	·	540 m	MPC · JPL
474507	2003 UP_{83}	—	October 17, 2003	Anderson Mesa	LONEOS	·	1.5 km	MPC · JPL
474508	2003 UT_{87}	—	October 19, 2003	Anderson Mesa	LONEOS	EUN	1.3 km	MPC · JPL
474509	2003 UN_{89}	—	September 28, 2003	Socorro	LINEAR	·	1.3 km	MPC · JPL
474510	2003 UM_{119}	—	October 1, 2003	Kitt Peak	Spacewatch	·	1.8 km	MPC · JPL
474511	2003 UD_{123}	—	October 19, 2003	Kitt Peak	Spacewatch	·	1.4 km	MPC · JPL
474512	2003 UF_{125}	—	October 20, 2003	Socorro	LINEAR	·	1.7 km	MPC · JPL
474513	2003 UF_{134}	—	October 20, 2003	Palomar	NEAT	·	1.5 km	MPC · JPL
474514	2003 UO_{177}	—	October 1, 2003	Kitt Peak	Spacewatch	·	580 m	MPC · JPL
474515	2003 UU_{179}	—	October 21, 2003	Socorro	LINEAR	·	1.6 km	MPC · JPL
474516	2003 UW_{180}	—	October 21, 2003	Kitt Peak	Spacewatch	ADE	1.9 km	MPC · JPL
474517	2003 UV_{204}	—	October 22, 2003	Socorro	LINEAR	EUN	1.2 km	MPC · JPL
474518	2003 UD_{210}	—	October 23, 2003	Anderson Mesa	LONEOS	·	700 m	MPC · JPL
474519	2003 US_{230}	—	October 23, 2003	Kitt Peak	Spacewatch	·	1.5 km	MPC · JPL
474520	2003 UA_{231}	—	September 16, 2003	Kitt Peak	Spacewatch	·	920 m	MPC · JPL
474521	2003 UZ_{239}	—	October 22, 2003	Socorro	LINEAR	·	1.9 km	MPC · JPL
474522	2003 UQ_{271}	—	October 21, 2003	Kitt Peak	Spacewatch	·	1.8 km	MPC · JPL
474523	2003 UG_{279}	—	October 27, 2003	Socorro	LINEAR	·	1.7 km	MPC · JPL
474524	2003 UN_{305}	—	October 1, 2003	Kitt Peak	Spacewatch	·	1.6 km	MPC · JPL
474525	2003 UA_{318}	—	October 22, 2003	Apache Point	SDSS	·	1.4 km	MPC · JPL
474526	2003 UD_{330}	—	October 17, 2003	Kitt Peak	Spacewatch	·	1.7 km	MPC · JPL
474527	2003 UM_{332}	—	October 18, 2003	Apache Point	SDSS	·	1.2 km	MPC · JPL
474528	2003 UH_{341}	—	October 19, 2003	Apache Point	SDSS	EUN	1.4 km	MPC · JPL
474529	2003 UY_{342}	—	September 30, 2003	Kitt Peak	Spacewatch	·	1.7 km	MPC · JPL
474530	2003 UY_{351}	—	October 19, 2003	Apache Point	SDSS	·	1.4 km	MPC · JPL
474531	2003 UJ_{365}	—	October 20, 2003	Kitt Peak	Spacewatch	·	1.7 km	MPC · JPL
474532	2003 VG_{1}	—	November 5, 2003	Socorro	LINEAR	AMO	580 m	MPC · JPL
474533	2003 VU_{4}	—	November 15, 2003	Kitt Peak	Spacewatch	·	600 m	MPC · JPL
474534	2003 WF	—	October 22, 2003	Kitt Peak	Spacewatch	·	1.9 km	MPC · JPL
474535	2003 WK_{12}	—	November 16, 2003	Kitt Peak	Spacewatch	H	570 m	MPC · JPL
474536	2003 WS_{12}	—	October 27, 2003	Kitt Peak	Spacewatch	·	590 m	MPC · JPL
474537	2003 WF_{13}	—	November 18, 2003	Kitt Peak	Spacewatch	LEO	1.5 km	MPC · JPL
474538	2003 WT_{21}	—	November 20, 2003	Socorro	LINEAR	·	1.3 km	MPC · JPL
474539	2003 WZ_{26}	—	November 16, 2003	Kitt Peak	Spacewatch	·	1.9 km	MPC · JPL
474540	2003 WU_{34}	—	November 19, 2003	Kitt Peak	Spacewatch	·	1.5 km	MPC · JPL
474541	2003 WY_{60}	—	October 23, 2003	Kitt Peak	Spacewatch	·	1.8 km	MPC · JPL
474542	2003 WA_{68}	—	November 19, 2003	Kitt Peak	Spacewatch	·	2.5 km	MPC · JPL
474543	2003 WF_{69}	—	November 19, 2003	Kitt Peak	Spacewatch	·	2.0 km	MPC · JPL
474544	2003 WC_{88}	—	November 19, 2003	Kitt Peak	Spacewatch	H	480 m	MPC · JPL
474545	2003 WK_{109}	—	October 20, 2003	Kitt Peak	Spacewatch	·	540 m	MPC · JPL
474546	2003 WP_{115}	—	November 20, 2003	Socorro	LINEAR	·	650 m	MPC · JPL
474547	2003 WY_{122}	—	November 20, 2003	Socorro	LINEAR	·	1.6 km	MPC · JPL
474548	2003 WJ_{145}	—	November 21, 2003	Socorro	LINEAR	·	1.3 km	MPC · JPL
474549	2003 WX_{153}	—	November 26, 2003	Socorro	LINEAR	APO +1km	1.5 km	MPC · JPL
474550	2003 WB_{171}	—	November 21, 2003	Palomar	NEAT	JUN	950 m	MPC · JPL
474551	2003 XV_{20}	—	December 14, 2003	Kitt Peak	Spacewatch	·	1.2 km	MPC · JPL
474552	2003 YC_{4}	—	December 16, 2003	Catalina	CSS	JUN	1 km	MPC · JPL
474553	2003 YK_{30}	—	December 18, 2003	Socorro	LINEAR	·	1.4 km	MPC · JPL
474554	2003 YQ_{94}	—	December 22, 2003	Kitt Peak	Spacewatch	AMO · APO +1km	1.1 km	MPC · JPL
474555	2003 YM_{140}	—	December 28, 2003	Socorro	LINEAR	·	1.5 km	MPC · JPL
474556	2003 YJ_{147}	—	December 29, 2003	Socorro	LINEAR	·	2.1 km	MPC · JPL
474557	2003 YF_{160}	—	December 17, 2003	Socorro	LINEAR	·	2.2 km	MPC · JPL
474558	2004 AZ_{2}	—	December 22, 2003	Socorro	LINEAR	JUN	1.1 km	MPC · JPL
474559	2004 AK_{18}	—	January 15, 2004	Kitt Peak	Spacewatch	·	1.4 km	MPC · JPL
474560	2004 BT_{1}	—	January 16, 2004	Palomar	NEAT	T_{j} (2.83) · CYB	5.3 km	MPC · JPL
474561	2004 BU_{35}	—	January 19, 2004	Kitt Peak	Spacewatch	·	2.1 km	MPC · JPL
474562	2004 BK_{39}	—	January 21, 2004	Socorro	LINEAR	·	1.6 km	MPC · JPL
474563	2004 BK_{92}	—	December 22, 2003	Kitt Peak	Spacewatch	H	570 m	MPC · JPL
474564	2004 BO_{107}	—	January 28, 2004	Catalina	CSS	·	1.8 km	MPC · JPL
474565	2004 CJ_{25}	—	February 11, 2004	Kitt Peak	Spacewatch	·	1.6 km	MPC · JPL
474566	2004 CC_{31}	—	January 30, 2004	Kitt Peak	Spacewatch	·	1.7 km	MPC · JPL
474567	2004 CY_{56}	—	January 27, 2004	Catalina	CSS	H	550 m	MPC · JPL
474568	2004 CJ_{119}	—	January 31, 2004	Kitt Peak	Spacewatch	DOR	1.8 km	MPC · JPL
474569	2004 EB_{10}	—	March 12, 2004	Palomar	NEAT	·	690 m	MPC · JPL
474570	2004 EB_{32}	—	March 14, 2004	Palomar	NEAT	PHO	1.4 km	MPC · JPL
474571	2004 EP_{40}	—	February 26, 2004	Socorro	LINEAR	·	1.0 km	MPC · JPL
474572	2004 EW_{72}	—	March 14, 2004	Kitt Peak	Spacewatch	·	720 m	MPC · JPL
474573	2004 ER_{81}	—	March 15, 2004	Socorro	LINEAR	·	1.3 km	MPC · JPL
474574	2004 FG_{1}	—	March 17, 2004	Socorro	LINEAR	AMO	470 m	MPC · JPL
474575	2004 FF_{18}	—	March 23, 2004	Socorro	LINEAR	T_{j} (2.9)	2.0 km	MPC · JPL
474576	2004 FU_{78}	—	March 19, 2004	Kitt Peak	Spacewatch	·	1.7 km	MPC · JPL
474577	2004 FM_{91}	—	March 15, 2004	Socorro	LINEAR	·	1.3 km	MPC · JPL
474578	2004 FP_{111}	—	March 26, 2004	Kitt Peak	Spacewatch	NYS	950 m	MPC · JPL
474579	2004 FA_{116}	—	March 23, 2004	Socorro	LINEAR	·	2.1 km	MPC · JPL
474580	2004 FL_{117}	—	March 27, 2004	Kitt Peak	Spacewatch	·	3.3 km	MPC · JPL
474581	2004 FG_{132}	—	March 23, 2004	Kitt Peak	Spacewatch	·	700 m	MPC · JPL
474582	2004 FP_{141}	—	March 27, 2004	Socorro	LINEAR	·	2.8 km	MPC · JPL
474583	2004 GC_{18}	—	April 12, 2004	Catalina	CSS	·	3.4 km	MPC · JPL
474584	2004 GM_{31}	—	April 16, 2004	Kitt Peak	Spacewatch	·	2.6 km	MPC · JPL
474585	2004 HC_{2}	—	April 19, 2004	Socorro	LINEAR	APO	420 m	MPC · JPL
474586	2004 HL_{8}	—	March 31, 2004	Kitt Peak	Spacewatch	·	1.1 km	MPC · JPL
474587	2004 HD_{25}	—	April 19, 2004	Socorro	LINEAR	·	2.5 km	MPC · JPL
474588	2004 LX_{20}	—	June 12, 2004	Kitt Peak	Spacewatch	·	2.6 km	MPC · JPL
474589	2004 LZ_{29}	—	June 14, 2004	Kitt Peak	Spacewatch	·	1.0 km	MPC · JPL
474590	2004 NA_{14}	—	July 11, 2004	Socorro	LINEAR	·	2.8 km	MPC · JPL
474591	2004 NN_{29}	—	July 14, 2004	Socorro	LINEAR	·	3.4 km	MPC · JPL
474592	2004 PG_{30}	—	August 8, 2004	Campo Imperatore	CINEOS	·	1.3 km	MPC · JPL
474593	2004 PU_{62}	—	August 10, 2004	Socorro	LINEAR	·	2.6 km	MPC · JPL
474594	2004 PE_{84}	—	August 10, 2004	Socorro	LINEAR	T_{j} (2.91)	4.3 km	MPC · JPL
474595	2004 PH_{93}	—	August 7, 2004	Palomar	NEAT	·	3.3 km	MPC · JPL
474596	2004 RS_{40}	—	September 7, 2004	Socorro	LINEAR	·	1.1 km	MPC · JPL
474597	2004 RW_{40}	—	September 7, 2004	Kitt Peak	Spacewatch	·	1.2 km	MPC · JPL
474598	2004 RL_{42}	—	September 8, 2004	Campo Imperatore	CINEOS	PHO	940 m	MPC · JPL
474599	2004 RY_{49}	—	August 23, 2004	Kitt Peak	Spacewatch	·	640 m	MPC · JPL
474600	2004 RG_{110}	—	September 7, 2004	Palomar	NEAT	·	4.9 km	MPC · JPL

== 474601–474700 ==
back to top

Designation			Discovery			Properties		Ref
Permanent	Provisional	Named after	Date	Site	Discoverer(s)	Category	Diam.	Ref
474601	2004 RS_{149}	—	September 9, 2004	Socorro	LINEAR	·	840 m	MPC · JPL
474602	2004 RH_{158}	—	September 10, 2004	Socorro	LINEAR	·	700 m	MPC · JPL
474603	2004 RL_{232}	—	September 9, 2004	Kitt Peak	Spacewatch	(5)	950 m	MPC · JPL
474604	2004 RR_{236}	—	September 10, 2004	Kitt Peak	Spacewatch	·	760 m	MPC · JPL
474605	2004 RD_{237}	—	September 10, 2004	Kitt Peak	Spacewatch	·	3.3 km	MPC · JPL
474606	2004 RR_{242}	—	September 10, 2004	Kitt Peak	Spacewatch	·	3.4 km	MPC · JPL
474607	2004 RG_{245}	—	September 10, 2004	Kitt Peak	Spacewatch	·	1.0 km	MPC · JPL
474608	2004 RE_{327}	—	September 13, 2004	Kitt Peak	Spacewatch	·	1.0 km	MPC · JPL
474609	2004 SY_{43}	—	September 18, 2004	Socorro	LINEAR	·	790 m	MPC · JPL
474610	2004 SX_{49}	—	September 10, 2004	Kitt Peak	Spacewatch	T_{j} (2.99)	4.2 km	MPC · JPL
474611	2004 SB_{56}	—	September 25, 2004	Anderson Mesa	LONEOS	ATE	500 m	MPC · JPL
474612	2004 TX_{18}	—	October 8, 2004	Anderson Mesa	LONEOS	·	490 m	MPC · JPL
474613	2004 TL_{19}	—	October 15, 2004	Socorro	LINEAR	AMO	220 m	MPC · JPL
474614	2004 TZ_{27}	—	October 4, 2004	Kitt Peak	Spacewatch	·	1.2 km	MPC · JPL
474615	2004 TX_{42}	—	October 4, 2004	Kitt Peak	Spacewatch	·	1.2 km	MPC · JPL
474616	2004 TV_{44}	—	October 4, 2004	Kitt Peak	Spacewatch	·	1.0 km	MPC · JPL
474617	2004 TY_{57}	—	October 5, 2004	Kitt Peak	Spacewatch	MAR	1.0 km	MPC · JPL
474618	2004 TT_{78}	—	October 4, 2004	Kitt Peak	Spacewatch	·	1.2 km	MPC · JPL
474619	2004 TD_{98}	—	October 5, 2004	Kitt Peak	Spacewatch	·	670 m	MPC · JPL
474620	2004 TH_{149}	—	October 6, 2004	Kitt Peak	Spacewatch	(5)	1.1 km	MPC · JPL
474621	2004 TG_{159}	—	October 6, 2004	Kitt Peak	Spacewatch	·	540 m	MPC · JPL
474622	2004 TL_{163}	—	October 6, 2004	Kitt Peak	Spacewatch	·	1.2 km	MPC · JPL
474623	2004 TF_{177}	—	September 15, 2004	Kitt Peak	Spacewatch	·	3.0 km	MPC · JPL
474624	2004 TL_{188}	—	October 7, 2004	Kitt Peak	Spacewatch	·	3.2 km	MPC · JPL
474625	2004 TU_{196}	—	October 7, 2004	Kitt Peak	Spacewatch	·	700 m	MPC · JPL
474626	2004 TR_{220}	—	October 6, 2004	Kitt Peak	Spacewatch	·	800 m	MPC · JPL
474627	2004 TN_{230}	—	October 8, 2004	Kitt Peak	Spacewatch	·	1.1 km	MPC · JPL
474628	2004 TX_{232}	—	October 8, 2004	Kitt Peak	Spacewatch	(5)	880 m	MPC · JPL
474629	2004 TQ_{265}	—	October 9, 2004	Kitt Peak	Spacewatch	·	390 m	MPC · JPL
474630	2004 TF_{269}	—	October 9, 2004	Kitt Peak	Spacewatch	(5)	810 m	MPC · JPL
474631	2004 TG_{336}	—	October 10, 2004	Kitt Peak	Spacewatch	·	1.3 km	MPC · JPL
474632	2004 TO_{342}	—	October 13, 2004	Kitt Peak	Spacewatch	·	1.1 km	MPC · JPL
474633	2004 UT	—	October 18, 2004	Goodricke-Pigott	Goodricke-Pigott	CYB	3.8 km	MPC · JPL
474634	2004 UY	—	October 20, 2004	Socorro	LINEAR	·	1.3 km	MPC · JPL
474635	2004 VN_{29}	—	November 3, 2004	Kitt Peak	Spacewatch	(5)	830 m	MPC · JPL
474636	2004 VE_{63}	—	November 9, 2004	Catalina	CSS	(5)	960 m	MPC · JPL
474637	2004 VG_{74}	—	November 12, 2004	Catalina	CSS	·	950 m	MPC · JPL
474638	2004 VD_{75}	—	November 12, 2004	Haleakala	NEAT	·	2.5 km	MPC · JPL
474639	2004 VH_{80}	—	November 3, 2004	Kitt Peak	Spacewatch	·	1.0 km	MPC · JPL
474640 Alicanto	2004 VN_{112}	Alicanto	November 6, 2004	Cerro Tololo	A. C. Becker	EDDO	193 km	MPC · JPL
474641	2004 WL_{8}	—	November 19, 2004	Catalina	CSS	BRG	1.4 km	MPC · JPL
474642	2004 XN_{3}	—	December 3, 2004	Eskridge	Farpoint	·	880 m	MPC · JPL
474643	2004 XX_{15}	—	December 10, 2004	Kitt Peak	Spacewatch	(5)	880 m	MPC · JPL
474644	2004 XF_{21}	—	December 8, 2004	Socorro	LINEAR	·	1.0 km	MPC · JPL
474645	2004 XS_{32}	—	December 10, 2004	Socorro	LINEAR	·	1.2 km	MPC · JPL
474646	2004 XZ_{58}	—	December 10, 2004	Kitt Peak	Spacewatch	JUN	1.1 km	MPC · JPL
474647	2004 XA_{59}	—	December 10, 2004	Kitt Peak	Spacewatch	BRG	1.4 km	MPC · JPL
474648	2004 XW_{66}	—	December 3, 2004	Kitt Peak	Spacewatch	·	1.1 km	MPC · JPL
474649	2004 XK_{93}	—	December 11, 2004	Kitt Peak	Spacewatch	·	1.7 km	MPC · JPL
474650	2004 XK_{103}	—	December 15, 2004	Catalina	CSS	·	1.5 km	MPC · JPL
474651	2004 XT_{108}	—	December 11, 2004	Kitt Peak	Spacewatch	·	1 km	MPC · JPL
474652	2004 XO_{109}	—	December 13, 2004	Kitt Peak	Spacewatch	·	1.3 km	MPC · JPL
474653	2004 XC_{119}	—	December 12, 2004	Kitt Peak	Spacewatch	·	1.5 km	MPC · JPL
474654	2004 XF_{119}	—	December 12, 2004	Kitt Peak	Spacewatch	·	1.2 km	MPC · JPL
474655	2004 XF_{133}	—	December 15, 2004	Kitt Peak	Spacewatch	RAF	1.2 km	MPC · JPL
474656	2004 XS_{147}	—	December 13, 2004	Kitt Peak	Spacewatch	·	1.1 km	MPC · JPL
474657	2004 YB_{13}	—	December 19, 2004	Mount Lemmon	Mount Lemmon Survey	·	1.5 km	MPC · JPL
474658	2004 YG_{17}	—	December 18, 2004	Mount Lemmon	Mount Lemmon Survey	(5)	1.2 km	MPC · JPL
474659	2004 YN_{25}	—	December 18, 2004	Mount Lemmon	Mount Lemmon Survey	(5)	1.1 km	MPC · JPL
474660	2005 AT_{1}	—	January 1, 2005	Catalina	CSS	·	2.1 km	MPC · JPL
474661	2005 AN_{3}	—	December 13, 2004	Kitt Peak	Spacewatch	·	930 m	MPC · JPL
474662	2005 AL_{4}	—	December 14, 2004	Kitt Peak	Spacewatch	(5)	930 m	MPC · JPL
474663	2005 AG_{6}	—	January 6, 2005	Catalina	CSS	(5)	1.4 km	MPC · JPL
474664	2005 AC_{17}	—	January 6, 2005	Socorro	LINEAR	·	1.3 km	MPC · JPL
474665	2005 AP_{21}	—	January 6, 2005	Catalina	CSS	·	1.1 km	MPC · JPL
474666	2005 AE_{27}	—	January 6, 2005	Catalina	CSS	·	4.0 km	MPC · JPL
474667	2005 AK_{42}	—	January 15, 2005	Catalina	CSS	·	1.4 km	MPC · JPL
474668	2005 AO_{65}	—	December 20, 2004	Mount Lemmon	Mount Lemmon Survey	·	1.2 km	MPC · JPL
474669	2005 AY_{77}	—	January 15, 2005	Kitt Peak	Spacewatch	·	1.8 km	MPC · JPL
474670	2005 BP_{9}	—	January 16, 2005	Socorro	LINEAR	(5)	1.7 km	MPC · JPL
474671	2005 BA_{14}	—	January 17, 2005	Kitt Peak	Spacewatch	H	430 m	MPC · JPL
474672	2005 BQ_{14}	—	January 16, 2005	Kitt Peak	Spacewatch	ADE	1.6 km	MPC · JPL
474673	2005 CF	—	February 1, 2005	Goodricke-Pigott	R. A. Tucker	·	1.4 km	MPC · JPL
474674	2005 CZ_{6}	—	February 1, 2005	Kitt Peak	Spacewatch	AMO	520 m	MPC · JPL
474675	2005 CK_{22}	—	February 1, 2005	Catalina	CSS	·	1.5 km	MPC · JPL
474676	2005 CL_{64}	—	February 2, 2005	Kitt Peak	Spacewatch	JUN	1.0 km	MPC · JPL
474677	2005 EJ_{12}	—	March 2, 2005	Catalina	CSS	·	1.8 km	MPC · JPL
474678	2005 ED_{31}	—	March 1, 2005	Kitt Peak	Spacewatch	·	1.5 km	MPC · JPL
474679	2005 EX_{37}	—	March 4, 2005	Kitt Peak	Spacewatch	·	2.3 km	MPC · JPL
474680	2005 EK_{62}	—	February 9, 2005	Kitt Peak	Spacewatch	·	1.8 km	MPC · JPL
474681	2005 EY_{72}	—	February 3, 2005	Socorro	LINEAR	ADE	2.0 km	MPC · JPL
474682	2005 EK_{73}	—	February 2, 2005	Catalina	CSS	(5)	860 m	MPC · JPL
474683	2005 EB_{86}	—	March 4, 2005	Socorro	LINEAR	·	1.2 km	MPC · JPL
474684	2005 EZ_{90}	—	March 8, 2005	Mount Lemmon	Mount Lemmon Survey	H	390 m	MPC · JPL
474685	2005 ED_{94}	—	March 8, 2005	Socorro	LINEAR	·	1.7 km	MPC · JPL
474686	2005 EJ_{114}	—	March 4, 2005	Mount Lemmon	Mount Lemmon Survey	·	610 m	MPC · JPL
474687	2005 EL_{118}	—	March 7, 2005	Socorro	LINEAR	·	1.9 km	MPC · JPL
474688	2005 ER_{141}	—	March 10, 2005	Mount Lemmon	Mount Lemmon Survey	·	1.6 km	MPC · JPL
474689	2005 EL_{208}	—	March 4, 2005	Kitt Peak	Spacewatch	·	500 m	MPC · JPL
474690	2005 EU_{212}	—	March 4, 2005	Mount Lemmon	Mount Lemmon Survey	·	1.2 km	MPC · JPL
474691	2005 EL_{214}	—	March 8, 2005	Anderson Mesa	LONEOS	·	1.2 km	MPC · JPL
474692	2005 EW_{240}	—	March 11, 2005	Catalina	CSS	·	1.3 km	MPC · JPL
474693	2005 ED_{244}	—	March 11, 2005	Mount Lemmon	Mount Lemmon Survey	·	1.7 km	MPC · JPL
474694	2005 EG_{294}	—	March 11, 2005	Anderson Mesa	LONEOS	·	1.9 km	MPC · JPL
474695	2005 EQ_{294}	—	March 11, 2005	Mount Lemmon	Mount Lemmon Survey	HOF	2.7 km	MPC · JPL
474696	2005 EC_{316}	—	March 11, 2005	Mount Lemmon	Mount Lemmon Survey	·	1.6 km	MPC · JPL
474697	2005 ET_{330}	—	March 13, 2005	Catalina	CSS	EUN	1.3 km	MPC · JPL
474698	2005 GT_{1}	—	April 1, 2005	Kitt Peak	Spacewatch	·	1.8 km	MPC · JPL
474699	2005 GV_{34}	—	April 1, 2005	Anderson Mesa	LONEOS	·	1.5 km	MPC · JPL
474700	2005 GD_{41}	—	April 4, 2005	Catalina	CSS	·	2.1 km	MPC · JPL

== 474701–474800 ==
back to top

Designation			Discovery			Properties		Ref
Permanent	Provisional	Named after	Date	Site	Discoverer(s)	Category	Diam.	Ref
474701	2005 GW_{79}	—	April 7, 2005	Socorro	LINEAR	H	490 m	MPC · JPL
474702	2005 GA_{87}	—	March 14, 2005	Mount Lemmon	Mount Lemmon Survey	·	1.9 km	MPC · JPL
474703	2005 GW_{100}	—	March 10, 2005	Mount Lemmon	Mount Lemmon Survey	·	650 m	MPC · JPL
474704	2005 GU_{111}	—	April 5, 2005	Catalina	CSS	H	610 m	MPC · JPL
474705	2005 GG_{117}	—	April 11, 2005	Kitt Peak	Spacewatch	·	1.7 km	MPC · JPL
474706	2005 GC_{141}	—	April 12, 2005	Anderson Mesa	LONEOS	AMO	450 m	MPC · JPL
474707	2005 GJ_{150}	—	April 11, 2005	Kitt Peak	Spacewatch	DOR	2.3 km	MPC · JPL
474708	2005 GV_{156}	—	April 10, 2005	Mount Lemmon	Mount Lemmon Survey	·	1.7 km	MPC · JPL
474709	2005 GF_{170}	—	March 17, 2005	Mount Lemmon	Mount Lemmon Survey	T_{j} (2.98) · 3:2	6.0 km	MPC · JPL
474710	2005 GF_{178}	—	April 7, 2005	Kitt Peak	Spacewatch	·	650 m	MPC · JPL
474711	2005 GC_{216}	—	April 1, 2005	Kitt Peak	Spacewatch	PAD	1.4 km	MPC · JPL
474712	2005 GA_{221}	—	April 6, 2005	Kitt Peak	Spacewatch	·	1.5 km	MPC · JPL
474713	2005 GC_{223}	—	April 10, 2005	Mount Lemmon	Mount Lemmon Survey	AGN	1.1 km	MPC · JPL
474714	2005 HY	—	April 4, 2005	Mount Lemmon	Mount Lemmon Survey	·	680 m	MPC · JPL
474715	2005 JK_{11}	—	May 4, 2005	Mauna Kea	Veillet, C.	AST	1.7 km	MPC · JPL
474716	2005 JS_{34}	—	May 4, 2005	Kitt Peak	Spacewatch	·	620 m	MPC · JPL
474717	2005 JA_{55}	—	May 4, 2005	Kitt Peak	Spacewatch	·	650 m	MPC · JPL
474718	2005 JQ_{98}	—	May 8, 2005	Kitt Peak	Spacewatch	H	530 m	MPC · JPL
474719	2005 JM_{119}	—	May 10, 2005	Kitt Peak	Spacewatch	·	750 m	MPC · JPL
474720	2005 JO_{177}	—	May 7, 2005	Mount Lemmon	Mount Lemmon Survey	·	2.2 km	MPC · JPL
474721	2005 KJ_{1}	—	May 3, 2005	Kitt Peak	Spacewatch	·	610 m	MPC · JPL
474722	2005 LW_{41}	—	June 13, 2005	Mount Lemmon	Mount Lemmon Survey	·	760 m	MPC · JPL
474723	2005 LM_{44}	—	May 20, 2005	Mount Lemmon	Mount Lemmon Survey	·	850 m	MPC · JPL
474724	2005 LM_{48}	—	June 13, 2005	Mount Lemmon	Mount Lemmon Survey	·	750 m	MPC · JPL
474725	2005 MP_{21}	—	June 17, 2005	Mount Lemmon	Mount Lemmon Survey	·	2.1 km	MPC · JPL
474726	2005 MM_{28}	—	June 29, 2005	Kitt Peak	Spacewatch	·	4.1 km	MPC · JPL
474727	2005 MG_{29}	—	June 29, 2005	Kitt Peak	Spacewatch	·	2.7 km	MPC · JPL
474728	2005 MJ_{33}	—	June 29, 2005	Kitt Peak	Spacewatch	·	3.4 km	MPC · JPL
474729	2005 ML_{33}	—	June 29, 2005	Kitt Peak	Spacewatch	EOS	1.9 km	MPC · JPL
474730	2005 MA_{34}	—	June 29, 2005	Anderson Mesa	LONEOS	·	1.2 km	MPC · JPL
474731	2005 ML_{40}	—	June 30, 2005	Kitt Peak	Spacewatch	·	960 m	MPC · JPL
474732	2005 NT_{1}	—	July 1, 2005	Kitt Peak	Spacewatch	·	2.4 km	MPC · JPL
474733	2005 NH_{17}	—	July 3, 2005	Mount Lemmon	Mount Lemmon Survey	NYS	750 m	MPC · JPL
474734	2005 NZ_{17}	—	July 4, 2005	Mount Lemmon	Mount Lemmon Survey	·	2.8 km	MPC · JPL
474735	2005 NU_{25}	—	July 4, 2005	Kitt Peak	Spacewatch	·	2.9 km	MPC · JPL
474736	2005 NT_{28}	—	July 5, 2005	Palomar	NEAT	·	790 m	MPC · JPL
474737	2005 NF_{30}	—	July 4, 2005	Kitt Peak	Spacewatch	NYS	850 m	MPC · JPL
474738	2005 NE_{35}	—	July 5, 2005	Kitt Peak	Spacewatch	THM	2.0 km	MPC · JPL
474739	2005 NK_{54}	—	July 10, 2005	Kitt Peak	Spacewatch	·	800 m	MPC · JPL
474740	2005 NG_{71}	—	July 5, 2005	Kitt Peak	Spacewatch	·	740 m	MPC · JPL
474741	2005 NB_{78}	—	July 3, 2005	Mount Lemmon	Mount Lemmon Survey	·	2.1 km	MPC · JPL
474742	2005 NM_{107}	—	July 7, 2005	Mauna Kea	Veillet, C.	·	1.2 km	MPC · JPL
474743	2005 ON_{8}	—	May 15, 2005	Mount Lemmon	Mount Lemmon Survey	·	820 m	MPC · JPL
474744	2005 OU_{12}	—	July 29, 2005	Palomar	NEAT	·	3.5 km	MPC · JPL
474745	2005 OR_{17}	—	July 30, 2005	Palomar	NEAT	ERI	1.2 km	MPC · JPL
474746	2005 OC_{23}	—	July 30, 2005	Palomar	NEAT	·	670 m	MPC · JPL
474747	2005 OW_{28}	—	July 26, 2005	Palomar	NEAT	·	1.9 km	MPC · JPL
474748	2005 PB_{4}	—	August 6, 2005	Socorro	LINEAR	·	1.0 km	MPC · JPL
474749	2005 PN_{9}	—	August 4, 2005	Palomar	NEAT	·	910 m	MPC · JPL
474750	2005 PV_{28}	—	August 8, 2005	Cerro Tololo	M. W. Buie	EOS	1.7 km	MPC · JPL
474751	2005 QE_{12}	—	August 24, 2005	Palomar	NEAT	·	3.0 km	MPC · JPL
474752	2005 QV_{23}	—	August 27, 2005	Kitt Peak	Spacewatch	MAS	730 m	MPC · JPL
474753	2005 QM_{25}	—	August 27, 2005	Kitt Peak	Spacewatch	·	2.0 km	MPC · JPL
474754	2005 QC_{33}	—	August 25, 2005	Palomar	NEAT	·	910 m	MPC · JPL
474755	2005 QO_{34}	—	August 25, 2005	Palomar	NEAT	·	770 m	MPC · JPL
474756	2005 QR_{36}	—	August 25, 2005	Palomar	NEAT	·	3.4 km	MPC · JPL
474757	2005 QD_{44}	—	August 26, 2005	Palomar	NEAT	MAS	610 m	MPC · JPL
474758	2005 QU_{48}	—	August 26, 2005	Palomar	NEAT	NYS	900 m	MPC · JPL
474759	2005 QK_{50}	—	August 26, 2005	Palomar	NEAT	·	3.2 km	MPC · JPL
474760	2005 QR_{54}	—	August 28, 2005	Kitt Peak	Spacewatch	·	2.6 km	MPC · JPL
474761	2005 QU_{57}	—	August 24, 2005	Palomar	NEAT	·	3.2 km	MPC · JPL
474762	2005 QQ_{66}	—	August 27, 2005	Anderson Mesa	LONEOS	(2076)	980 m	MPC · JPL
474763	2005 QQ_{75}	—	August 25, 2005	Reedy Creek	J. Broughton	·	1.4 km	MPC · JPL
474764	2005 QS_{81}	—	August 29, 2005	Socorro	LINEAR	MAS	660 m	MPC · JPL
474765	2005 QT_{83}	—	August 29, 2005	Anderson Mesa	LONEOS	·	2.3 km	MPC · JPL
474766	2005 QS_{91}	—	August 26, 2005	Anderson Mesa	LONEOS	NYS	900 m	MPC · JPL
474767	2005 QB_{94}	—	August 26, 2005	Palomar	NEAT	NYS	980 m	MPC · JPL
474768	2005 QD_{107}	—	August 27, 2005	Palomar	NEAT	·	2.6 km	MPC · JPL
474769	2005 QK_{109}	—	August 27, 2005	Palomar	NEAT	·	3.1 km	MPC · JPL
474770	2005 QE_{111}	—	August 27, 2005	Palomar	NEAT	·	1.4 km	MPC · JPL
474771	2005 QE_{117}	—	August 28, 2005	Kitt Peak	Spacewatch	MAS	650 m	MPC · JPL
474772	2005 QZ_{118}	—	August 28, 2005	Kitt Peak	Spacewatch	·	2.2 km	MPC · JPL
474773	2005 QP_{119}	—	August 28, 2005	Kitt Peak	Spacewatch	·	1.8 km	MPC · JPL
474774	2005 QN_{122}	—	August 28, 2005	Kitt Peak	Spacewatch	·	1.9 km	MPC · JPL
474775	2005 QK_{123}	—	August 28, 2005	Kitt Peak	Spacewatch	·	2.5 km	MPC · JPL
474776	2005 QQ_{123}	—	August 28, 2005	Kitt Peak	Spacewatch	THM	1.9 km	MPC · JPL
474777	2005 QL_{126}	—	August 28, 2005	Kitt Peak	Spacewatch	·	1.6 km	MPC · JPL
474778	2005 QN_{128}	—	August 28, 2005	Kitt Peak	Spacewatch	·	2.7 km	MPC · JPL
474779	2005 QK_{131}	—	August 28, 2005	Kitt Peak	Spacewatch	·	850 m	MPC · JPL
474780	2005 QN_{132}	—	August 28, 2005	Kitt Peak	Spacewatch	·	3.9 km	MPC · JPL
474781	2005 QS_{133}	—	August 28, 2005	Kitt Peak	Spacewatch	·	2.8 km	MPC · JPL
474782	2005 QQ_{136}	—	August 28, 2005	Kitt Peak	Spacewatch	·	900 m	MPC · JPL
474783	2005 QR_{138}	—	August 28, 2005	Kitt Peak	Spacewatch	THM	1.8 km	MPC · JPL
474784	2005 QW_{139}	—	August 28, 2005	Kitt Peak	Spacewatch	·	2.0 km	MPC · JPL
474785	2005 QX_{139}	—	August 28, 2005	Kitt Peak	Spacewatch	(1298)	2.5 km	MPC · JPL
474786	2005 QJ_{141}	—	August 30, 2005	Campo Imperatore	CINEOS	·	3.0 km	MPC · JPL
474787	2005 QK_{147}	—	August 28, 2005	Siding Spring	SSS	·	3.4 km	MPC · JPL
474788	2005 QE_{151}	—	August 30, 2005	Kitt Peak	Spacewatch	·	2.9 km	MPC · JPL
474789	2005 QH_{159}	—	August 28, 2005	Anderson Mesa	LONEOS	THB	4.1 km	MPC · JPL
474790	2005 QV_{167}	—	August 28, 2005	Anderson Mesa	LONEOS	H	630 m	MPC · JPL
474791	2005 QF_{179}	—	August 25, 2005	Palomar	NEAT	MAS	580 m	MPC · JPL
474792	2005 QV_{186}	—	August 25, 2005	Palomar	NEAT	·	3.6 km	MPC · JPL
474793	2005 QD_{187}	—	August 29, 2005	Kitt Peak	Spacewatch	NYS	990 m	MPC · JPL
474794	2005 QX_{188}	—	August 31, 2005	Kitt Peak	Spacewatch	·	2.3 km	MPC · JPL
474795	2005 QE_{190}	—	August 31, 2005	Kitt Peak	Spacewatch	·	2.5 km	MPC · JPL
474796	2005 RW_{5}	—	September 6, 2005	Anderson Mesa	LONEOS	NYS	870 m	MPC · JPL
474797	2005 RO_{22}	—	September 1, 2005	Kitt Peak	Spacewatch	·	1.2 km	MPC · JPL
474798	2005 RD_{28}	—	September 11, 2005	Anderson Mesa	LONEOS	·	2.3 km	MPC · JPL
474799	2005 RL_{29}	—	August 29, 2005	Kitt Peak	Spacewatch	·	2.2 km	MPC · JPL
474800	2005 RA_{41}	—	September 12, 2005	Kitt Peak	Spacewatch	MAS	560 m	MPC · JPL

== 474801–474900 ==
back to top

Designation			Discovery			Properties		Ref
Permanent	Provisional	Named after	Date	Site	Discoverer(s)	Category	Diam.	Ref
474801	2005 RD_{42}	—	August 31, 2005	Kitt Peak	Spacewatch	·	960 m	MPC · JPL
474802	2005 RB_{43}	—	September 14, 2005	Kitt Peak	Spacewatch	EOS	3.3 km	MPC · JPL
474803	2005 RD_{44}	—	September 2, 2005	Palomar	NEAT	·	2.8 km	MPC · JPL
474804	2005 SB_{6}	—	September 23, 2005	Kitt Peak	Spacewatch	·	1.3 km	MPC · JPL
474805	2005 SQ_{11}	—	September 23, 2005	Kitt Peak	Spacewatch	THM	2.0 km	MPC · JPL
474806	2005 SV_{11}	—	September 23, 2005	Kitt Peak	Spacewatch	HYG	2.4 km	MPC · JPL
474807	2005 SZ_{11}	—	September 23, 2005	Kitt Peak	Spacewatch	MAS	590 m	MPC · JPL
474808	2005 SW_{13}	—	September 24, 2005	Kitt Peak	Spacewatch	·	900 m	MPC · JPL
474809	2005 SE_{14}	—	September 24, 2005	Kitt Peak	Spacewatch	EOS	1.5 km	MPC · JPL
474810	2005 SA_{16}	—	September 26, 2005	Kitt Peak	Spacewatch	·	830 m	MPC · JPL
474811	2005 SY_{16}	—	September 26, 2005	Kitt Peak	Spacewatch	EOS	1.9 km	MPC · JPL
474812	2005 SR_{17}	—	September 26, 2005	Kitt Peak	Spacewatch	·	3.0 km	MPC · JPL
474813	2005 SH_{18}	—	September 26, 2005	Kitt Peak	Spacewatch	MAS	600 m	MPC · JPL
474814	2005 SQ_{23}	—	September 23, 2005	Catalina	CSS	·	4.7 km	MPC · JPL
474815	2005 SO_{25}	—	August 30, 2005	Kitt Peak	Spacewatch	THM	1.9 km	MPC · JPL
474816	2005 SZ_{33}	—	September 23, 2005	Kitt Peak	Spacewatch	NYS	1.2 km	MPC · JPL
474817	2005 SU_{37}	—	September 24, 2005	Kitt Peak	Spacewatch	·	3.5 km	MPC · JPL
474818	2005 SZ_{38}	—	September 24, 2005	Kitt Peak	Spacewatch	MAS	580 m	MPC · JPL
474819	2005 SK_{39}	—	September 24, 2005	Kitt Peak	Spacewatch	·	1.7 km	MPC · JPL
474820	2005 SN_{39}	—	September 24, 2005	Kitt Peak	Spacewatch	·	2.3 km	MPC · JPL
474821	2005 SW_{40}	—	September 24, 2005	Kitt Peak	Spacewatch	·	1 km	MPC · JPL
474822	2005 SZ_{41}	—	September 24, 2005	Kitt Peak	Spacewatch	·	990 m	MPC · JPL
474823	2005 SS_{42}	—	September 24, 2005	Kitt Peak	Spacewatch	·	3.7 km	MPC · JPL
474824	2005 SK_{43}	—	September 24, 2005	Kitt Peak	Spacewatch	·	2.6 km	MPC · JPL
474825	2005 SX_{43}	—	September 24, 2005	Kitt Peak	Spacewatch	NYS	1.1 km	MPC · JPL
474826	2005 SY_{48}	—	September 24, 2005	Kitt Peak	Spacewatch	·	810 m	MPC · JPL
474827	2005 SA_{50}	—	September 24, 2005	Kitt Peak	Spacewatch	·	2.1 km	MPC · JPL
474828	2005 SH_{51}	—	September 24, 2005	Kitt Peak	Spacewatch	H	530 m	MPC · JPL
474829	2005 ST_{55}	—	September 25, 2005	Kitt Peak	Spacewatch	·	990 m	MPC · JPL
474830	2005 SP_{56}	—	September 25, 2005	Kitt Peak	Spacewatch	·	4.6 km	MPC · JPL
474831	2005 SJ_{59}	—	September 26, 2005	Kitt Peak	Spacewatch	·	2.6 km	MPC · JPL
474832	2005 SQ_{59}	—	September 26, 2005	Kitt Peak	Spacewatch	·	2.5 km	MPC · JPL
474833	2005 SB_{63}	—	August 30, 2005	Kitt Peak	Spacewatch	·	940 m	MPC · JPL
474834	2005 SF_{63}	—	September 26, 2005	Palomar	NEAT	MAS	540 m	MPC · JPL
474835	2005 SV_{63}	—	September 26, 2005	Kitt Peak	Spacewatch	NYS	1.2 km	MPC · JPL
474836	2005 SA_{64}	—	September 26, 2005	Kitt Peak	Spacewatch	·	970 m	MPC · JPL
474837	2005 SA_{67}	—	September 27, 2005	Kitt Peak	Spacewatch	EOS	1.7 km	MPC · JPL
474838	2005 SD_{67}	—	September 27, 2005	Kitt Peak	Spacewatch	·	2.3 km	MPC · JPL
474839	2005 SM_{67}	—	September 27, 2005	Kitt Peak	Spacewatch	·	2.4 km	MPC · JPL
474840	2005 SM_{68}	—	September 27, 2005	Kitt Peak	Spacewatch	HYG	2.5 km	MPC · JPL
474841	2005 SB_{73}	—	September 23, 2005	Catalina	CSS	·	3.0 km	MPC · JPL
474842	2005 SX_{74}	—	September 24, 2005	Kitt Peak	Spacewatch	·	920 m	MPC · JPL
474843	2005 SR_{75}	—	September 24, 2005	Kitt Peak	Spacewatch	MAS	680 m	MPC · JPL
474844	2005 SC_{76}	—	September 24, 2005	Kitt Peak	Spacewatch	VER	2.2 km	MPC · JPL
474845	2005 SK_{76}	—	September 24, 2005	Kitt Peak	Spacewatch	·	1.0 km	MPC · JPL
474846	2005 SR_{76}	—	September 24, 2005	Kitt Peak	Spacewatch	THM	2.6 km	MPC · JPL
474847	2005 SG_{77}	—	September 24, 2005	Kitt Peak	Spacewatch	·	990 m	MPC · JPL
474848	2005 SX_{80}	—	September 14, 2005	Kitt Peak	Spacewatch	·	2.0 km	MPC · JPL
474849	2005 SK_{82}	—	September 24, 2005	Kitt Peak	Spacewatch	·	2.6 km	MPC · JPL
474850	2005 SN_{83}	—	September 1, 2005	Campo Imperatore	CINEOS	·	1.1 km	MPC · JPL
474851	2005 SX_{84}	—	September 24, 2005	Kitt Peak	Spacewatch	·	2.1 km	MPC · JPL
474852	2005 SN_{87}	—	September 24, 2005	Kitt Peak	Spacewatch	·	2.1 km	MPC · JPL
474853	2005 SL_{90}	—	September 24, 2005	Kitt Peak	Spacewatch	LIX	3.9 km	MPC · JPL
474854	2005 SD_{91}	—	September 24, 2005	Kitt Peak	Spacewatch	·	1.0 km	MPC · JPL
474855	2005 SO_{92}	—	September 24, 2005	Kitt Peak	Spacewatch	·	960 m	MPC · JPL
474856	2005 SQ_{93}	—	September 24, 2005	Kitt Peak	Spacewatch	·	3.0 km	MPC · JPL
474857	2005 SY_{97}	—	September 25, 2005	Kitt Peak	Spacewatch	·	2.4 km	MPC · JPL
474858	2005 SO_{101}	—	September 25, 2005	Kitt Peak	Spacewatch	·	900 m	MPC · JPL
474859	2005 SR_{101}	—	September 25, 2005	Kitt Peak	Spacewatch	VER	2.4 km	MPC · JPL
474860	2005 SZ_{114}	—	September 27, 2005	Kitt Peak	Spacewatch	NYS	1.0 km	MPC · JPL
474861	2005 SW_{129}	—	September 29, 2005	Mount Lemmon	Mount Lemmon Survey	THM	2.6 km	MPC · JPL
474862	2005 SR_{131}	—	September 29, 2005	Kitt Peak	Spacewatch	·	2.9 km	MPC · JPL
474863	2005 SS_{131}	—	September 29, 2005	Kitt Peak	Spacewatch	MAS	540 m	MPC · JPL
474864	2005 SQ_{136}	—	August 31, 2005	Kitt Peak	Spacewatch	·	840 m	MPC · JPL
474865	2005 SH_{137}	—	September 24, 2005	Kitt Peak	Spacewatch	MAS	500 m	MPC · JPL
474866	2005 SB_{138}	—	September 13, 2005	Socorro	LINEAR	·	2.2 km	MPC · JPL
474867	2005 SO_{138}	—	September 25, 2005	Kitt Peak	Spacewatch	ELF	2.7 km	MPC · JPL
474868	2005 SE_{139}	—	September 25, 2005	Kitt Peak	Spacewatch	NYS	930 m	MPC · JPL
474869	2005 SN_{142}	—	September 25, 2005	Kitt Peak	Spacewatch	·	2.3 km	MPC · JPL
474870	2005 SU_{142}	—	September 25, 2005	Kitt Peak	Spacewatch	·	2.7 km	MPC · JPL
474871	2005 SH_{143}	—	September 25, 2005	Kitt Peak	Spacewatch	·	2.5 km	MPC · JPL
474872	2005 SO_{144}	—	September 25, 2005	Kitt Peak	Spacewatch	·	2.1 km	MPC · JPL
474873	2005 ST_{144}	—	September 25, 2005	Kitt Peak	Spacewatch	·	2.4 km	MPC · JPL
474874	2005 SG_{147}	—	September 25, 2005	Kitt Peak	Spacewatch	·	2.7 km	MPC · JPL
474875	2005 SZ_{147}	—	September 25, 2005	Kitt Peak	Spacewatch	·	900 m	MPC · JPL
474876	2005 SC_{148}	—	September 25, 2005	Kitt Peak	Spacewatch	THM	2.1 km	MPC · JPL
474877	2005 SM_{148}	—	September 25, 2005	Kitt Peak	Spacewatch	NYS	1.3 km	MPC · JPL
474878	2005 SJ_{149}	—	September 25, 2005	Kitt Peak	Spacewatch	VER	2.6 km	MPC · JPL
474879	2005 SM_{150}	—	September 25, 2005	Kitt Peak	Spacewatch	THM	2.4 km	MPC · JPL
474880	2005 SO_{150}	—	September 25, 2005	Kitt Peak	Spacewatch	·	2.4 km	MPC · JPL
474881	2005 SK_{152}	—	September 25, 2005	Kitt Peak	Spacewatch	·	3.1 km	MPC · JPL
474882	2005 SQ_{153}	—	September 26, 2005	Kitt Peak	Spacewatch	·	2.5 km	MPC · JPL
474883	2005 SO_{160}	—	September 27, 2005	Kitt Peak	Spacewatch	·	1.9 km	MPC · JPL
474884	2005 SD_{161}	—	September 27, 2005	Kitt Peak	Spacewatch	·	2.4 km	MPC · JPL
474885	2005 SU_{168}	—	September 29, 2005	Kitt Peak	Spacewatch	·	2.3 km	MPC · JPL
474886	2005 SJ_{169}	—	September 29, 2005	Kitt Peak	Spacewatch	·	2.9 km	MPC · JPL
474887	2005 SJ_{170}	—	September 29, 2005	Kitt Peak	Spacewatch	·	990 m	MPC · JPL
474888	2005 SR_{170}	—	September 29, 2005	Kitt Peak	Spacewatch	·	1.0 km	MPC · JPL
474889	2005 SA_{171}	—	September 29, 2005	Kitt Peak	Spacewatch	·	920 m	MPC · JPL
474890	2005 SJ_{173}	—	September 29, 2005	Kitt Peak	Spacewatch	·	2.6 km	MPC · JPL
474891	2005 SL_{173}	—	September 1, 2005	Kitt Peak	Spacewatch	V	610 m	MPC · JPL
474892	2005 SH_{175}	—	September 24, 2005	Kitt Peak	Spacewatch	·	2.3 km	MPC · JPL
474893	2005 SK_{176}	—	September 29, 2005	Kitt Peak	Spacewatch	·	2.8 km	MPC · JPL
474894	2005 ST_{177}	—	September 24, 2005	Kitt Peak	Spacewatch	·	2.2 km	MPC · JPL
474895	2005 SV_{182}	—	September 29, 2005	Kitt Peak	Spacewatch	ELF	3.2 km	MPC · JPL
474896	2005 SH_{183}	—	September 29, 2005	Kitt Peak	Spacewatch	·	3.0 km	MPC · JPL
474897	2005 SG_{184}	—	September 29, 2005	Kitt Peak	Spacewatch	(43176)	2.5 km	MPC · JPL
474898	2005 SJ_{184}	—	September 24, 2005	Kitt Peak	Spacewatch	·	1.2 km	MPC · JPL
474899	2005 ST_{184}	—	September 29, 2005	Kitt Peak	Spacewatch	·	1.1 km	MPC · JPL
474900	2005 SW_{187}	—	September 29, 2005	Mount Lemmon	Mount Lemmon Survey	·	1.1 km	MPC · JPL

== 474901–475000 ==
back to top

Designation			Discovery			Properties		Ref
Permanent	Provisional	Named after	Date	Site	Discoverer(s)	Category	Diam.	Ref
474901	2005 SD_{188}	—	September 29, 2005	Mount Lemmon	Mount Lemmon Survey	EOS	1.9 km	MPC · JPL
474902	2005 SM_{188}	—	September 29, 2005	Mount Lemmon	Mount Lemmon Survey	·	2.9 km	MPC · JPL
474903	2005 SH_{196}	—	September 30, 2005	Kitt Peak	Spacewatch	MAS	570 m	MPC · JPL
474904	2005 SH_{197}	—	September 30, 2005	Kitt Peak	Spacewatch	MAS	590 m	MPC · JPL
474905	2005 SP_{197}	—	August 30, 2005	Kitt Peak	Spacewatch	·	920 m	MPC · JPL
474906	2005 SC_{199}	—	September 30, 2005	Kitt Peak	Spacewatch	NYS	1.2 km	MPC · JPL
474907	2005 SZ_{209}	—	September 30, 2005	Palomar	NEAT	·	2.9 km	MPC · JPL
474908	2005 SU_{210}	—	September 30, 2005	Palomar	NEAT	·	3.2 km	MPC · JPL
474909	2005 SY_{210}	—	September 30, 2005	Palomar	NEAT	·	1.1 km	MPC · JPL
474910	2005 SV_{211}	—	September 30, 2005	Mount Lemmon	Mount Lemmon Survey	NYS	950 m	MPC · JPL
474911	2005 SC_{213}	—	September 30, 2005	Mount Lemmon	Mount Lemmon Survey	·	960 m	MPC · JPL
474912	2005 SQ_{213}	—	September 30, 2005	Kitt Peak	Spacewatch	THM	2.1 km	MPC · JPL
474913	2005 SR_{214}	—	September 30, 2005	Catalina	CSS	·	3.0 km	MPC · JPL
474914	2005 SU_{215}	—	September 30, 2005	Catalina	CSS	·	1.2 km	MPC · JPL
474915	2005 SX_{215}	—	September 30, 2005	Anderson Mesa	LONEOS	·	1.1 km	MPC · JPL
474916	2005 SU_{218}	—	September 30, 2005	Mount Lemmon	Mount Lemmon Survey	·	3.2 km	MPC · JPL
474917	2005 SB_{224}	—	September 29, 2005	Mount Lemmon	Mount Lemmon Survey	·	1 km	MPC · JPL
474918	2005 SB_{226}	—	September 23, 2005	Catalina	CSS	·	2.3 km	MPC · JPL
474919	2005 SG_{232}	—	September 30, 2005	Mount Lemmon	Mount Lemmon Survey	·	3.2 km	MPC · JPL
474920	2005 SX_{232}	—	September 30, 2005	Mount Lemmon	Mount Lemmon Survey	·	2.6 km	MPC · JPL
474921	2005 SD_{234}	—	September 29, 2005	Kitt Peak	Spacewatch	·	2.1 km	MPC · JPL
474922	2005 SC_{235}	—	September 23, 2005	Kitt Peak	Spacewatch	·	1.0 km	MPC · JPL
474923	2005 SS_{236}	—	September 29, 2005	Kitt Peak	Spacewatch	HYG	2.7 km	MPC · JPL
474924	2005 SA_{238}	—	September 29, 2005	Kitt Peak	Spacewatch	·	2.9 km	MPC · JPL
474925	2005 SK_{238}	—	September 29, 2005	Kitt Peak	Spacewatch	·	3.3 km	MPC · JPL
474926	2005 SA_{240}	—	September 30, 2005	Kitt Peak	Spacewatch	·	3.2 km	MPC · JPL
474927	2005 SB_{240}	—	September 30, 2005	Kitt Peak	Spacewatch	·	1.0 km	MPC · JPL
474928	2005 SG_{241}	—	September 30, 2005	Kitt Peak	Spacewatch	LIX	2.9 km	MPC · JPL
474929	2005 SL_{247}	—	September 30, 2005	Kitt Peak	Spacewatch	THM	2.0 km	MPC · JPL
474930	2005 ST_{256}	—	September 14, 2005	Kitt Peak	Spacewatch	·	940 m	MPC · JPL
474931	2005 SM_{257}	—	September 22, 2005	Palomar	NEAT	·	3.1 km	MPC · JPL
474932	2005 SN_{261}	—	August 28, 2005	Kitt Peak	Spacewatch	·	1.1 km	MPC · JPL
474933	2005 SS_{263}	—	September 23, 2005	Kitt Peak	Spacewatch	MAS	600 m	MPC · JPL
474934	2005 SB_{264}	—	September 23, 2005	Kitt Peak	Spacewatch	NYS	910 m	MPC · JPL
474935	2005 SW_{271}	—	September 27, 2005	Kitt Peak	Spacewatch	·	1.0 km	MPC · JPL
474936	2005 SE_{273}	—	September 30, 2005	Kitt Peak	Spacewatch	EOS	1.7 km	MPC · JPL
474937	2005 SZ_{279}	—	September 23, 2005	Kitt Peak	Spacewatch	V	640 m	MPC · JPL
474938	2005 SO_{280}	—	September 26, 2005	Kitt Peak	Spacewatch	VER	2.4 km	MPC · JPL
474939	2005 SX_{282}	—	September 21, 2005	Apache Point	A. C. Becker	LIX	3.2 km	MPC · JPL
474940	2005 SR_{284}	—	September 25, 2005	Apache Point	A. C. Becker	VER	2.2 km	MPC · JPL
474941	2005 SD_{285}	—	September 25, 2005	Apache Point	A. C. Becker	·	2.8 km	MPC · JPL
474942	2005 SG_{285}	—	September 25, 2005	Apache Point	A. C. Becker	·	2.3 km	MPC · JPL
474943	2005 SE_{287}	—	September 26, 2005	Apache Point	A. C. Becker	·	2.6 km	MPC · JPL
474944	2005 SJ_{288}	—	September 27, 2005	Apache Point	A. C. Becker	·	810 m	MPC · JPL
474945	2005 SN_{291}	—	September 23, 2005	Kitt Peak	Spacewatch	·	2.9 km	MPC · JPL
474946	2005 SE_{292}	—	September 29, 2005	Kitt Peak	Spacewatch	·	2.5 km	MPC · JPL
474947	2005 SW_{292}	—	September 29, 2005	Kitt Peak	Spacewatch	MAS	580 m	MPC · JPL
474948	2005 TR_{5}	—	October 1, 2005	Catalina	CSS	·	4.3 km	MPC · JPL
474949	2005 TH_{12}	—	October 1, 2005	Kitt Peak	Spacewatch	THM	2.2 km	MPC · JPL
474950	2005 TJ_{13}	—	October 2, 2005	Mount Lemmon	Mount Lemmon Survey	·	2.2 km	MPC · JPL
474951	2005 TD_{18}	—	October 1, 2005	Socorro	LINEAR	·	2.9 km	MPC · JPL
474952	2005 TX_{21}	—	October 1, 2005	Kitt Peak	Spacewatch	·	3.4 km	MPC · JPL
474953	2005 TD_{23}	—	October 1, 2005	Mount Lemmon	Mount Lemmon Survey	·	1.0 km	MPC · JPL
474954	2005 TU_{24}	—	October 1, 2005	Mount Lemmon	Mount Lemmon Survey	·	2.4 km	MPC · JPL
474955	2005 TD_{26}	—	October 1, 2005	Mount Lemmon	Mount Lemmon Survey	·	2.4 km	MPC · JPL
474956	2005 TH_{26}	—	October 1, 2005	Mount Lemmon	Mount Lemmon Survey	THM	2.1 km	MPC · JPL
474957	2005 TY_{33}	—	October 1, 2005	Kitt Peak	Spacewatch	VER	2.3 km	MPC · JPL
474958	2005 TU_{34}	—	October 1, 2005	Kitt Peak	Spacewatch	THM	1.9 km	MPC · JPL
474959	2005 TP_{39}	—	October 1, 2005	Kitt Peak	Spacewatch	·	2.3 km	MPC · JPL
474960	2005 TU_{41}	—	October 3, 2005	Socorro	LINEAR	T_{j} (2.96)	3.0 km	MPC · JPL
474961	2005 TJ_{46}	—	September 23, 2005	Kitt Peak	Spacewatch	·	2.7 km	MPC · JPL
474962	2005 TW_{47}	—	October 5, 2005	Bergisch Gladbach	W. Bickel	·	4.3 km	MPC · JPL
474963	2005 TZ_{50}	—	October 9, 2005	Goodricke-Pigott	R. A. Tucker	LIX	4.2 km	MPC · JPL
474964	2005 TC_{58}	—	October 1, 2005	Mount Lemmon	Mount Lemmon Survey	·	2.9 km	MPC · JPL
474965	2005 TW_{58}	—	October 1, 2005	Mount Lemmon	Mount Lemmon Survey	V	590 m	MPC · JPL
474966	2005 TD_{59}	—	October 1, 2005	Mount Lemmon	Mount Lemmon Survey	fast	2.6 km	MPC · JPL
474967	2005 TT_{59}	—	October 2, 2005	Mount Lemmon	Mount Lemmon Survey	VER	2.0 km	MPC · JPL
474968	2005 TL_{61}	—	October 3, 2005	Catalina	CSS	ERI	2.2 km	MPC · JPL
474969	2005 TH_{63}	—	October 4, 2005	Mount Lemmon	Mount Lemmon Survey	fast	1.0 km	MPC · JPL
474970	2005 TK_{63}	—	October 4, 2005	Mount Lemmon	Mount Lemmon Survey	PHO	770 m	MPC · JPL
474971	2005 TP_{64}	—	October 7, 2005	Kitt Peak	Spacewatch	PHO	1.0 km	MPC · JPL
474972	2005 TV_{64}	—	August 30, 2005	Kitt Peak	Spacewatch	·	2.2 km	MPC · JPL
474973	2005 TL_{72}	—	October 1, 2005	Catalina	CSS	·	2.5 km	MPC · JPL
474974	2005 TF_{77}	—	October 6, 2005	Catalina	CSS	MAS	590 m	MPC · JPL
474975	2005 TC_{80}	—	October 3, 2005	Kitt Peak	Spacewatch	·	2.8 km	MPC · JPL
474976	2005 TZ_{85}	—	October 3, 2005	Catalina	CSS	NYS	880 m	MPC · JPL
474977	2005 TF_{86}	—	October 4, 2005	Mount Lemmon	Mount Lemmon Survey	·	2.4 km	MPC · JPL
474978	2005 TC_{87}	—	September 30, 2005	Mount Lemmon	Mount Lemmon Survey	·	830 m	MPC · JPL
474979	2005 TL_{96}	—	October 6, 2005	Mount Lemmon	Mount Lemmon Survey	·	2.9 km	MPC · JPL
474980	2005 TQ_{97}	—	October 6, 2005	Mount Lemmon	Mount Lemmon Survey	·	3.0 km	MPC · JPL
474981	2005 TL_{101}	—	September 23, 2005	Kitt Peak	Spacewatch	·	3.3 km	MPC · JPL
474982	2005 TS_{102}	—	September 29, 2005	Kitt Peak	Spacewatch	·	2.9 km	MPC · JPL
474983	2005 TV_{103}	—	October 3, 2005	Socorro	LINEAR	·	1.1 km	MPC · JPL
474984	2005 TV_{112}	—	September 27, 2005	Kitt Peak	Spacewatch	·	3.0 km	MPC · JPL
474985	2005 TA_{113}	—	October 7, 2005	Kitt Peak	Spacewatch	NYS	850 m	MPC · JPL
474986	2005 TE_{121}	—	September 26, 2005	Kitt Peak	Spacewatch	·	2.7 km	MPC · JPL
474987	2005 TW_{122}	—	October 7, 2005	Kitt Peak	Spacewatch	·	2.1 km	MPC · JPL
474988	2005 TE_{123}	—	September 29, 2005	Mount Lemmon	Mount Lemmon Survey	·	2.8 km	MPC · JPL
474989	2005 TE_{127}	—	October 7, 2005	Kitt Peak	Spacewatch	THM	2.1 km	MPC · JPL
474990	2005 TN_{128}	—	September 29, 2005	Mount Lemmon	Mount Lemmon Survey	·	2.5 km	MPC · JPL
474991	2005 TU_{128}	—	October 7, 2005	Kitt Peak	Spacewatch	·	2.7 km	MPC · JPL
474992	2005 TR_{129}	—	October 7, 2005	Kitt Peak	Spacewatch	·	980 m	MPC · JPL
474993	2005 TP_{130}	—	October 7, 2005	Kitt Peak	Spacewatch	·	2.0 km	MPC · JPL
474994	2005 TZ_{130}	—	October 7, 2005	Kitt Peak	Spacewatch	·	2.5 km	MPC · JPL
474995	2005 TA_{132}	—	October 7, 2005	Kitt Peak	Spacewatch	·	2.3 km	MPC · JPL
474996	2005 TE_{134}	—	September 25, 2005	Kitt Peak	Spacewatch	·	2.7 km	MPC · JPL
474997	2005 TF_{136}	—	September 25, 2005	Kitt Peak	Spacewatch	·	2.1 km	MPC · JPL
474998	2005 TZ_{145}	—	October 8, 2005	Kitt Peak	Spacewatch	NYS	910 m	MPC · JPL
474999	2005 TU_{154}	—	October 9, 2005	Kitt Peak	Spacewatch	·	2.6 km	MPC · JPL
475000	2005 TC_{155}	—	October 9, 2005	Kitt Peak	Spacewatch	·	3.0 km	MPC · JPL

back to top

== Meaning of names ==
As minor planet discoveries are confirmed, they are given a permanent number by the IAU's Minor Planet Center (MPC), and the discoverers can then submit names for them, following the IAU's naming conventions. The list below concerns those minor planets in the specified number-range that have received names, and explains the meanings of those names.

Official naming citations of newly named small Solar System bodies are approved and published in a bulletin by IAU's Working Group for Small Bodies Nomenclature (WGSBN). Before May 2021, citations were published in MPC's Minor Planet Circulars for many decades. Recent citations can also be found on the JPL Small-Body Database (SBDB). Until his death in 2016, German astronomer Lutz D. Schmadel compiled these citations into the Dictionary of Minor Planet Names (DMP) and regularly updated the collection.

Based on Paul Herget's The Names of the Minor Planets, Schmadel also researched the unclear origin of numerous asteroids, most of which had been named prior to World War II. This article incorporates text from this source, which is in the public domain: SBDB New namings may only be added to this list below after official publication as the preannouncement of names is condemned. The WGSBN publishes a comprehensive guideline for the naming rules of non-cometary small Solar System bodies.

Named minor planet	Provisional	This minor planet was named for...	Ref · Catalog
474440 Nemesnagyágnes	2003 NH_{5}	Ágnes Nemes Nagy (1922–1991) was a Hungarian poet, writer, educator, and translator. She is generally considered to be Hungary's most important woman poet of the 20th century. In 1946 she published her first volume of poetry, but during the 1950s, her own work was suppressed and she worked as a translator.	IAU · 474440
474640 Alicanto	2004 VN_{112}	The Alicanto is a Chilean mythological bird of the Atacama Desert whose wings shine at night with beautiful, metallic colors.	IAU · 474640
