= Ágnes Nemes Nagy =

Hungarian poet, writer, educator, and translator

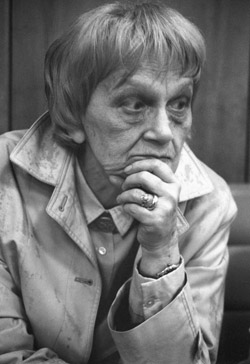
Ágnes Nemes Nagy in 1989

Ágnes Nemes Nagy (January 3, 1922 – August 23, 1991) was a Hungarian poet, writer, educator, and translator.

She was born in Budapest and earned a teaching diploma from the University of Budapest. From 1945 to 1953, she was employed by the education journal Köznevelés; from 1953 to 1957, she taught high school. After 1957, she devoted herself to writing.

Following World War II, Nemes Nagy worked on a literary periodical Újhold (New Moon); the editor was critic Balázs Lengyel, who she later married. The magazine was eventually banned by the government of the time. In 1946, Nemes Nagy published her first volume of poetry Kettős világban (In a dual world). In 1948, she was awarded the Baumgarten Prize. During the 1950s, her own work was suppressed and she worked as a translator, translating the works of Molière, Racine, Corneille, Bertolt Brecht and others.

== Selected works ==
- Szárazvillám (Heat lightning), poetry (1957)
- Az aranyecset (The golden brush), children's book
- Lila fecske (Purple swallow), children's book
- Napforduló (Solstice), poetry (1967)
- 64 hattyú (64 swans), essays (1975)
- Között (Between), poetry (1981)
- A Föld emlékei (Earth's souvenirs), poetry (1986)
