= Balázs Lengyel (critic) =

Hungarian literary critic (1918–2007)

Lengyel Balázs
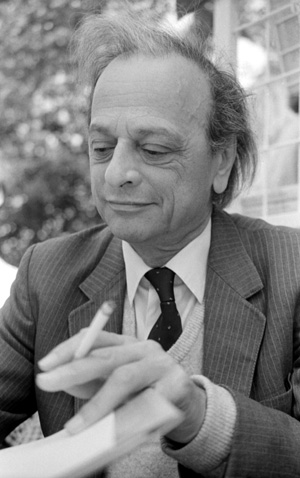
- Born: August 21, 1918; Budapest, Austria-Hungary
- Died: February 22, 2007 (aged 88); Budapest, Hungary
- Occupation: Literacy Critic

Lengyel Balázs (Budapest, 21 August 1918 – Budapest, 22 February 2007) was a Hungarian literary critic, and Righteous Among the Nations.

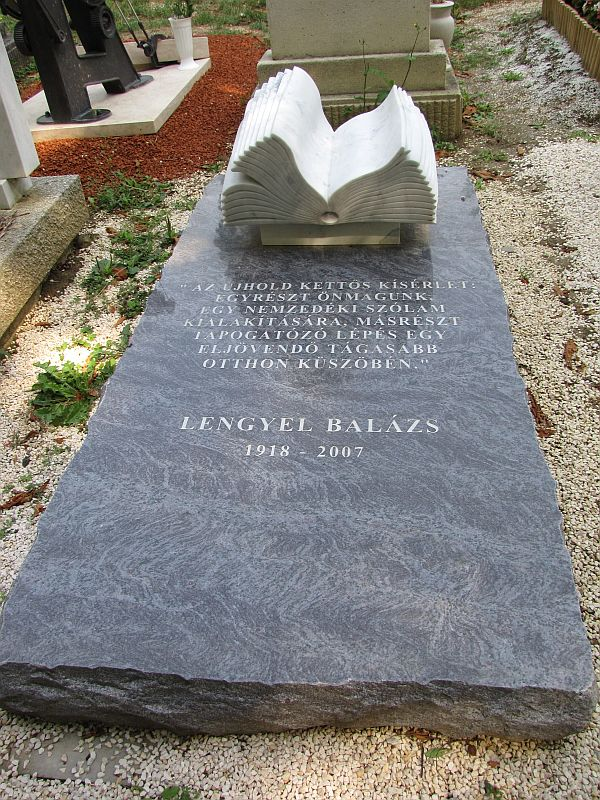
Lengyel Balázs gravestone in Budapesten.
