= Västertorp =

Urban district in Stockholm, Sweden

Coordinates: 59°17′28″N 17°58′0″E

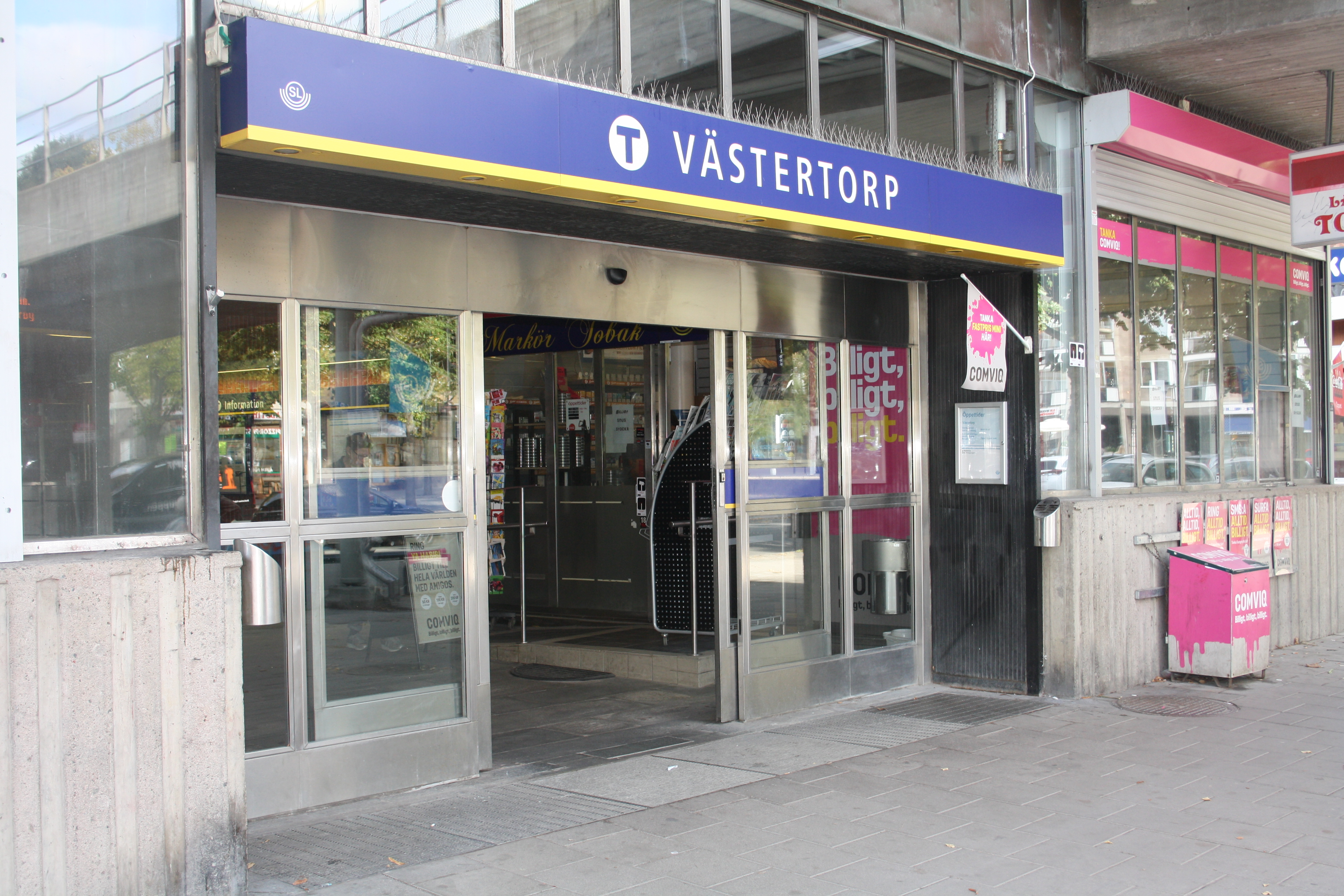
Västertorp Metro Station

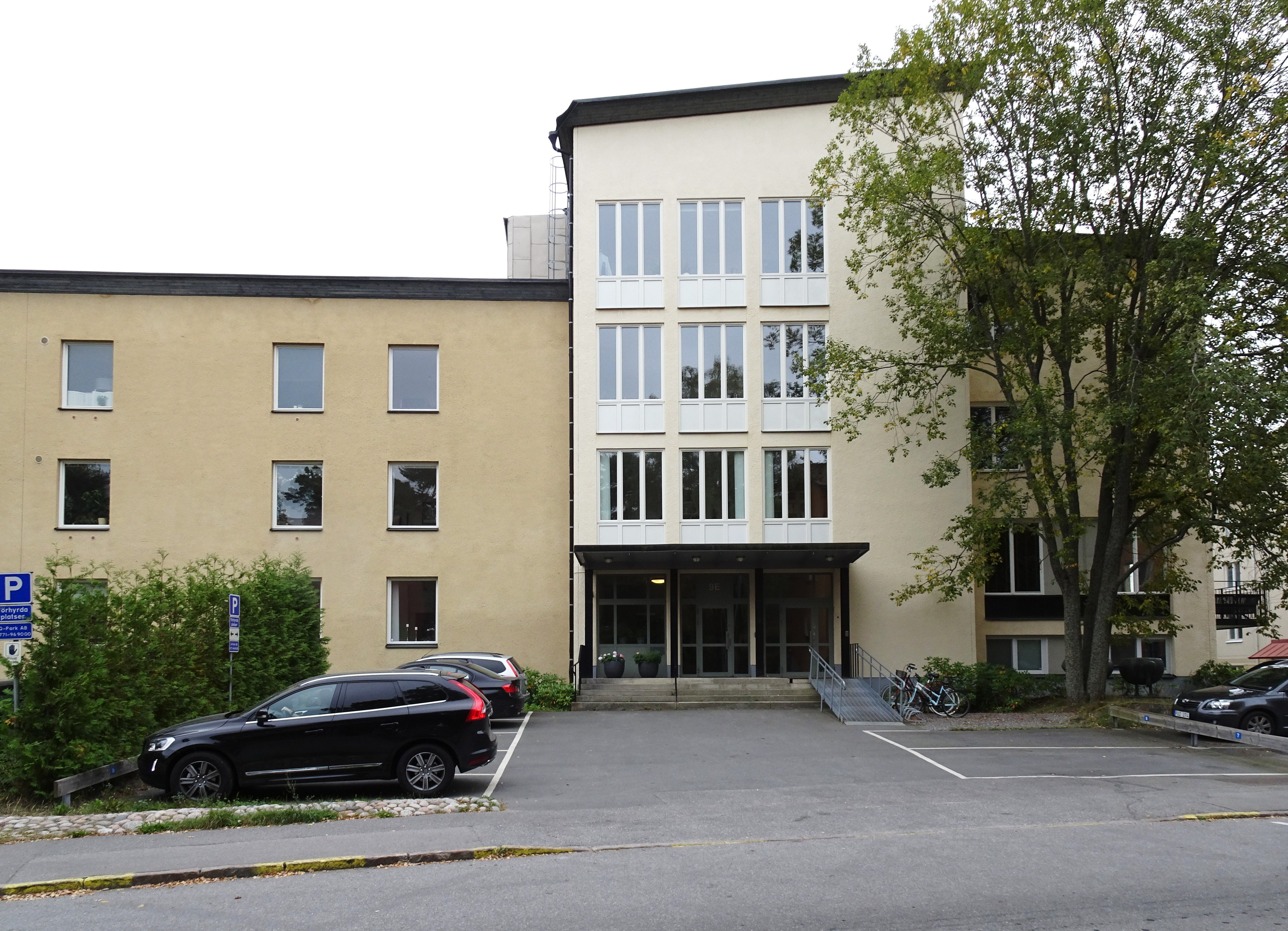
Västertorp Gymnasium

Västertorp (lit. 'Western Croft') is a district of the Hägersten-Liljeholmen borough in Söderort, the southern suburban part of Stockholm, Sweden.

== History ==
The district was formed on February 1, 1948. The suburb was constructed between 1949 and 1954. The city plan was established by the city planning director Sven Markelius (1889-1972).

In the centre of Västertorp, the 11-storey high-rise centre, nursing homes and old-age homes were erected in the late 1950s after drawings by architect Nils Sterner (1904-1990). Västertorp metro station was opened in 1964. Västertorp School was designed in 1949 by architect Stig Åkermark (1903-1995) and was inaugurated in 1951. Västertorp gymnasium was designed by architect Curt Laudon (1906-1964). It was in use as a high school during the years 1957–1984. In 2007, the former school premises were converted into housing.

Västertorp Sculpture Park (Västertorps skulpturpark) is a collection of 21 outdoor sculptures. The park is recognised for the many sculptures decorating the area. Most of the sculptures were erected during the 1950s and are made by Swedish sculptors. Art represented includes work by sculptors Stig Blomberg (1901-1970), Eric Grate (1896-1983) and Ivar Johnsson (1885-1970).

The sculptures were placed on the initiative of Fritz Herman Eriksson (1889-1970), director of land developer Olsson & Rosenlunds AB.

== Västertorp Sculpture Park ==
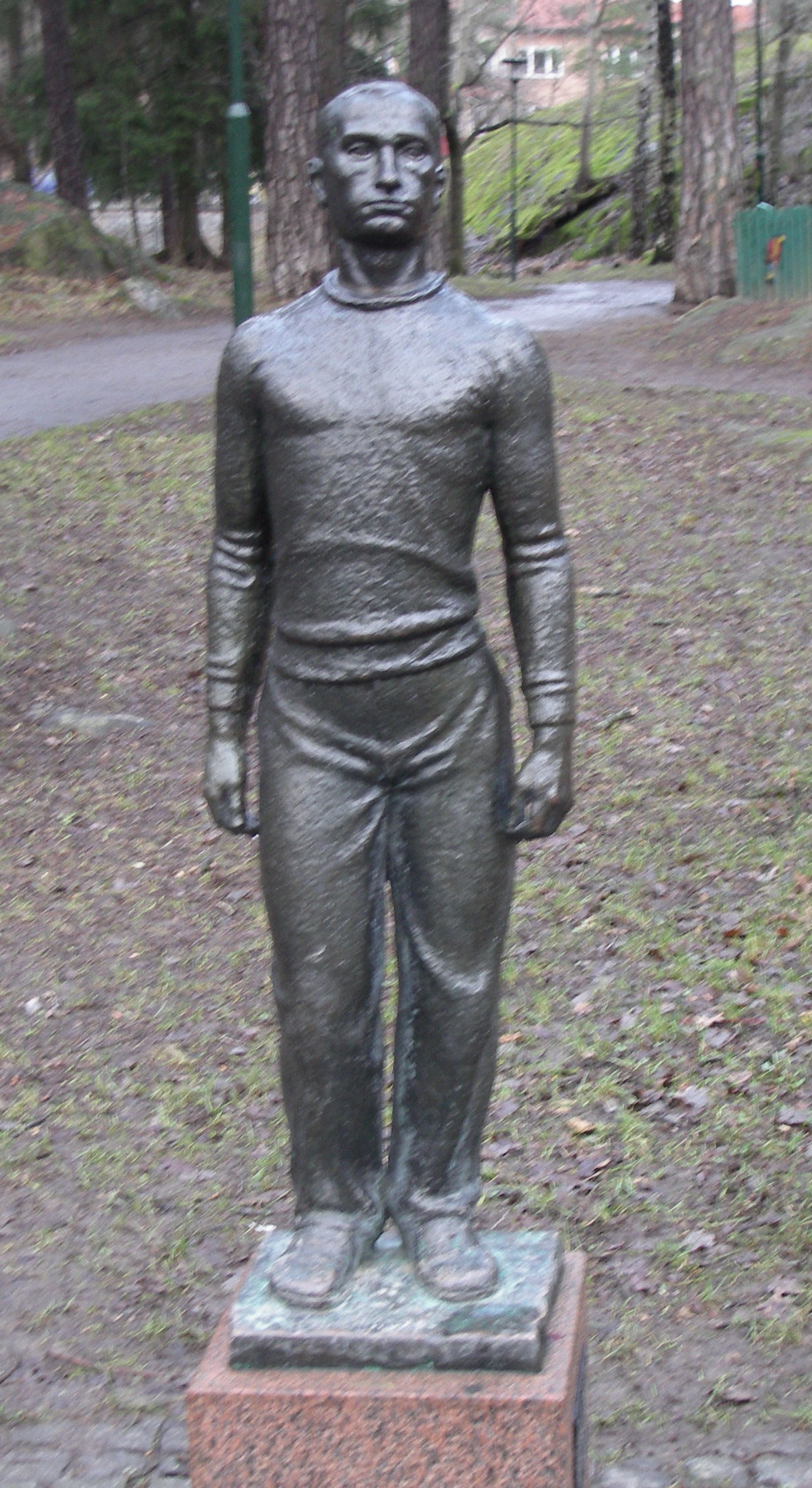
Mannen med islandströjan
Ivar Johnsson

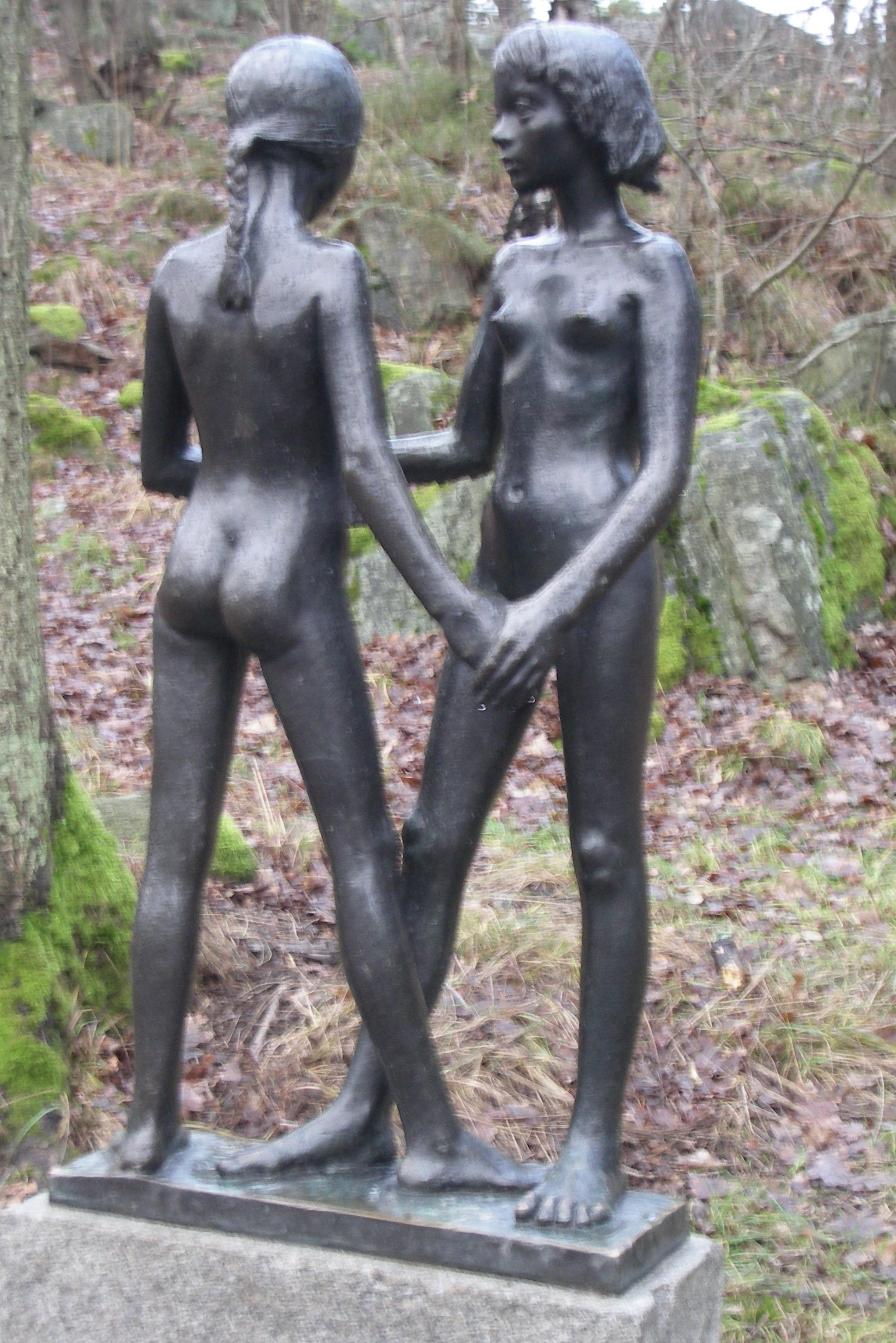
Systrarna
Stig Blomberg

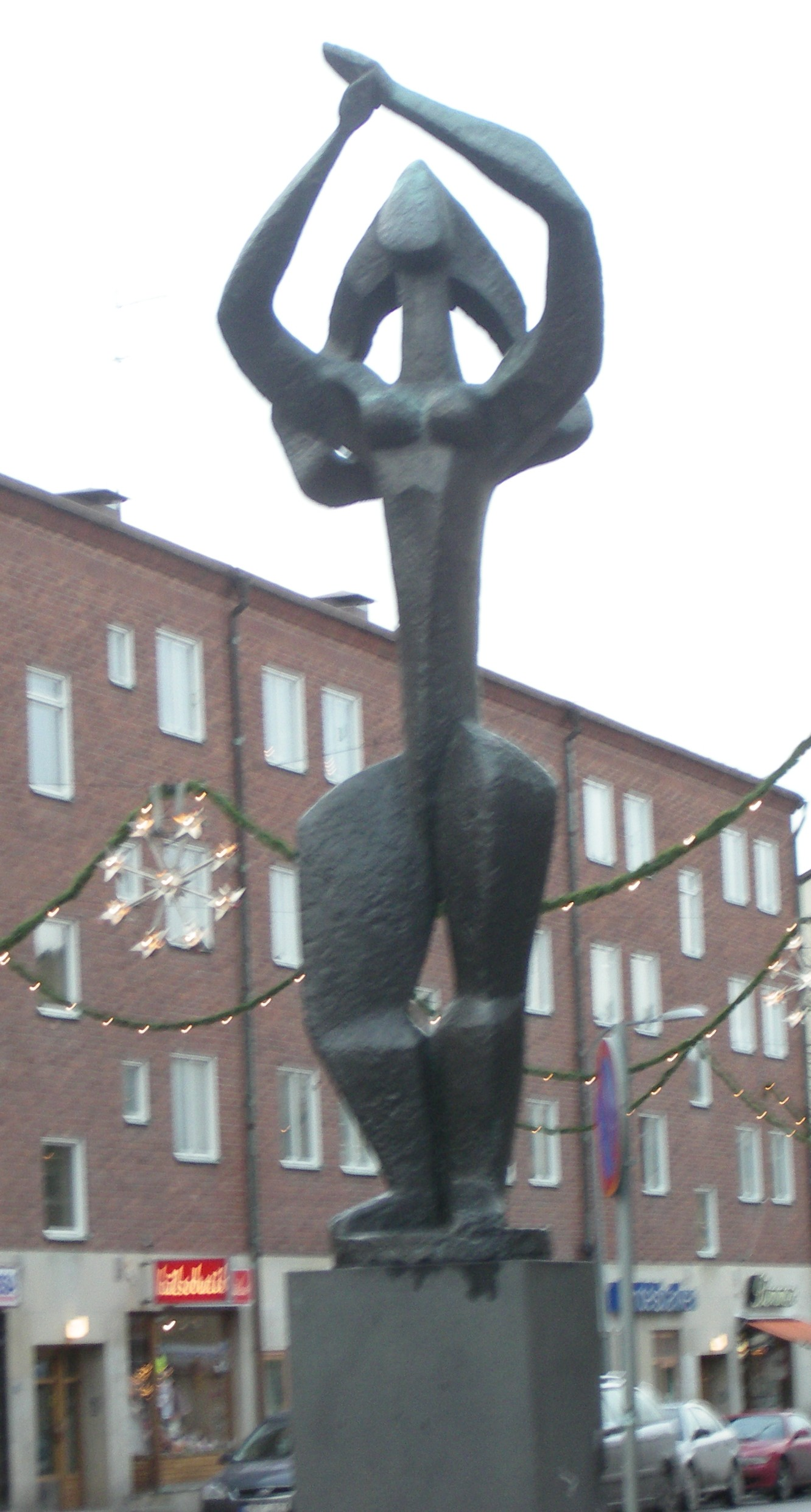
Trädet
Eric Grate

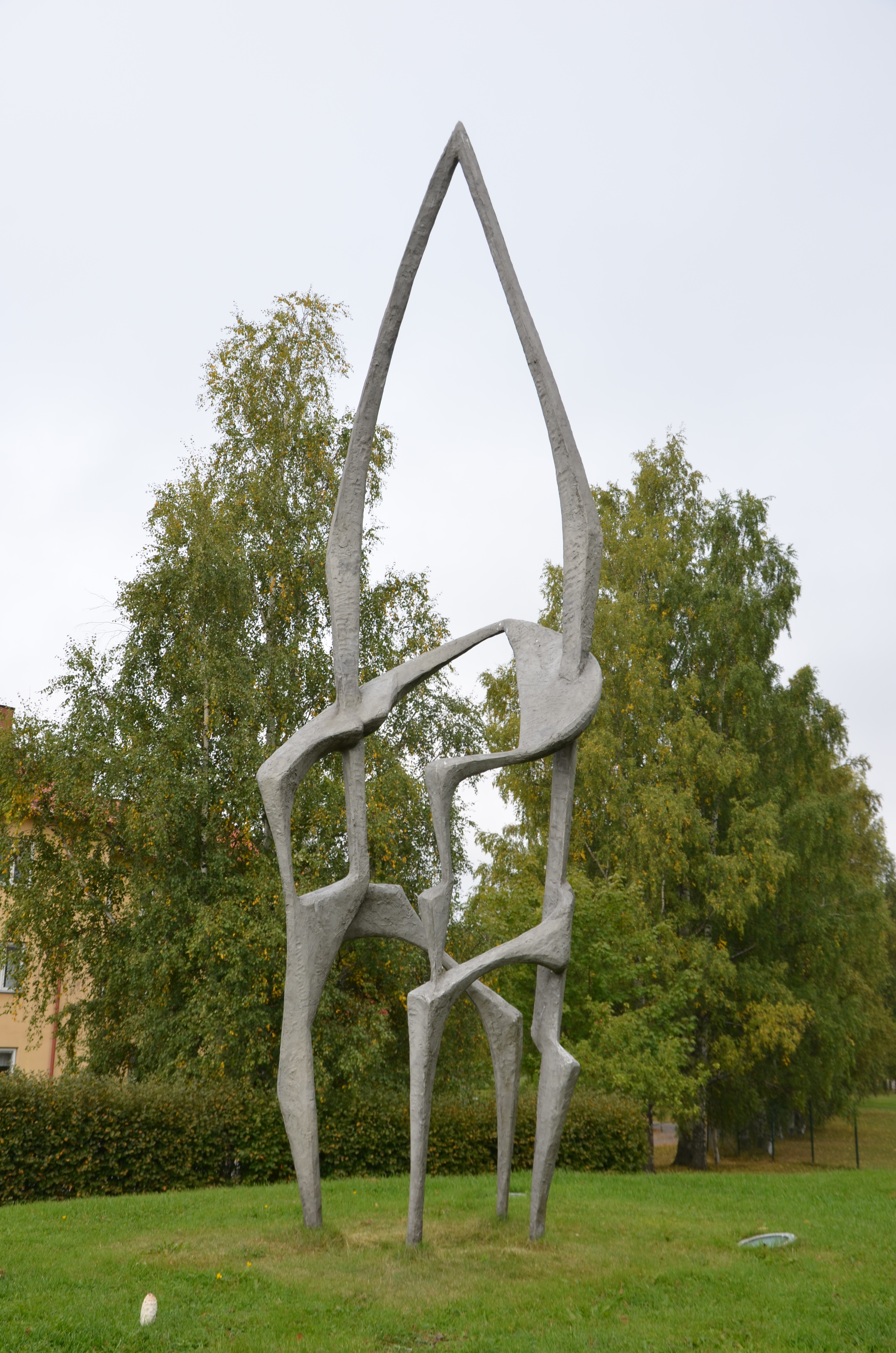
Katedral
Arne Jones

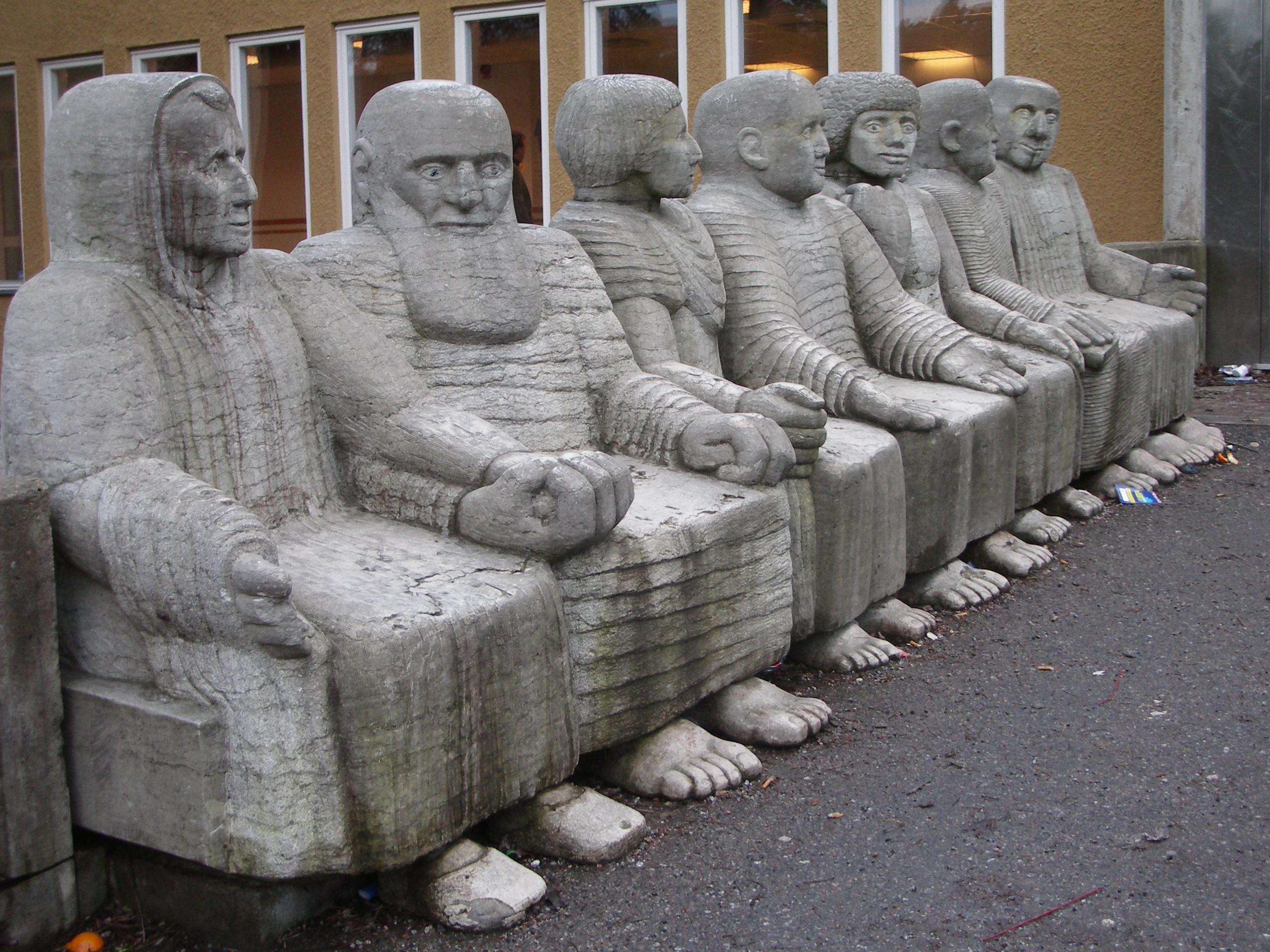
Efter badet
Pye Engström
