= Hägerstensåsen metro station =

Stockholm Metro station

Hägerstensåsen
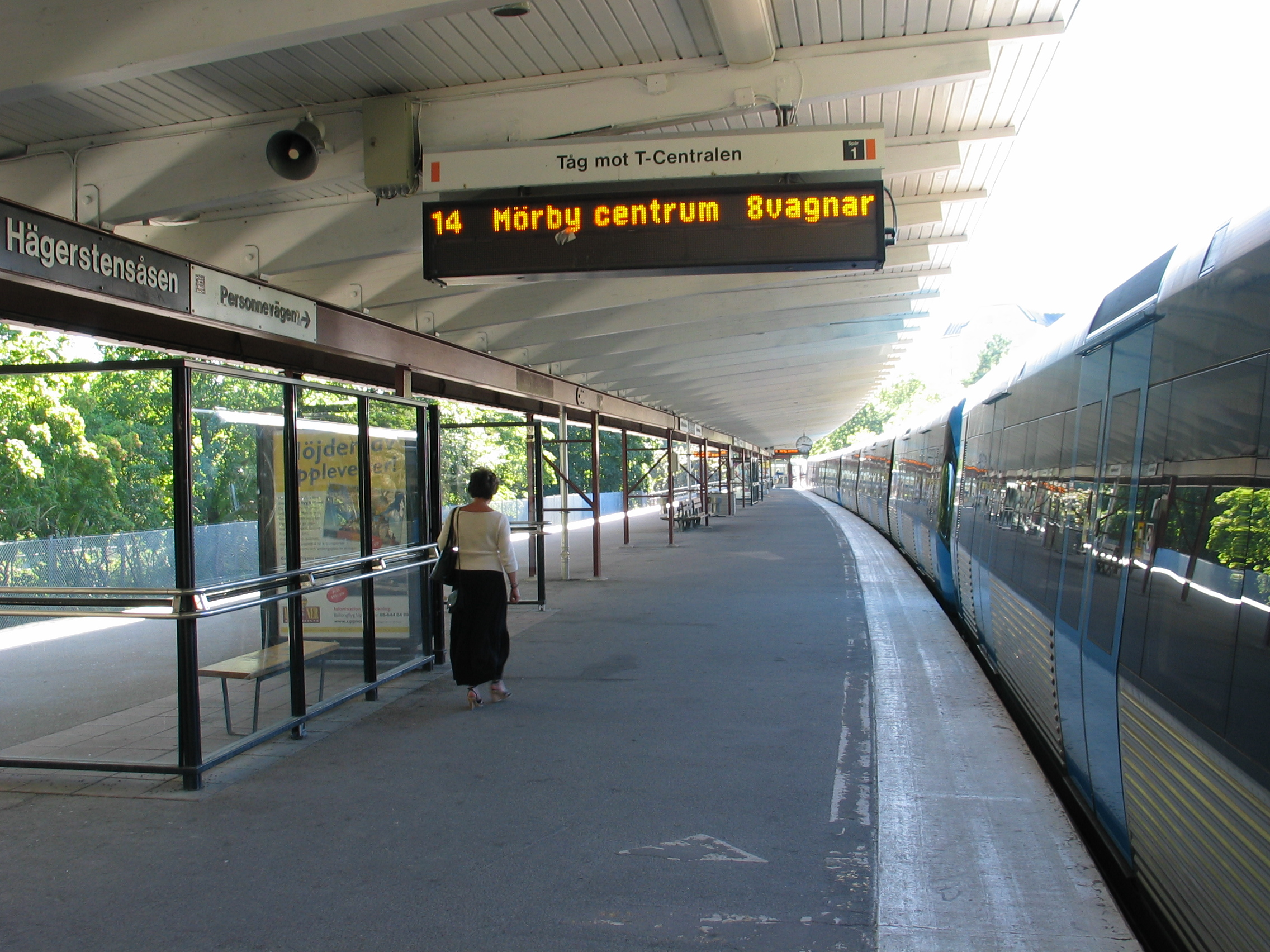
- Plaform looking west

General information
- Coordinates: 59°17′44″N 17°58′44″E
- Elevation: 46.5 m (153 ft) above sea level
- System: Stockholm Metro station
- Owner: Storstockholms Lokaltrafik
- Platforms: 1 island platform
- Tracks: 2

Construction
- Structure type: Elevated
- Accessible: Yes

Other information
- Station code: HSÅ

History
- Opened: 5 April 1964; 62 years ago

Passengers
- 2019: 5,250 boarding per weekday

Services
Preceding station	Stockholm Metro	Following station
Västertorp towards Fruängen	Line 14	Telefonplan towards Mörby centrum
Location
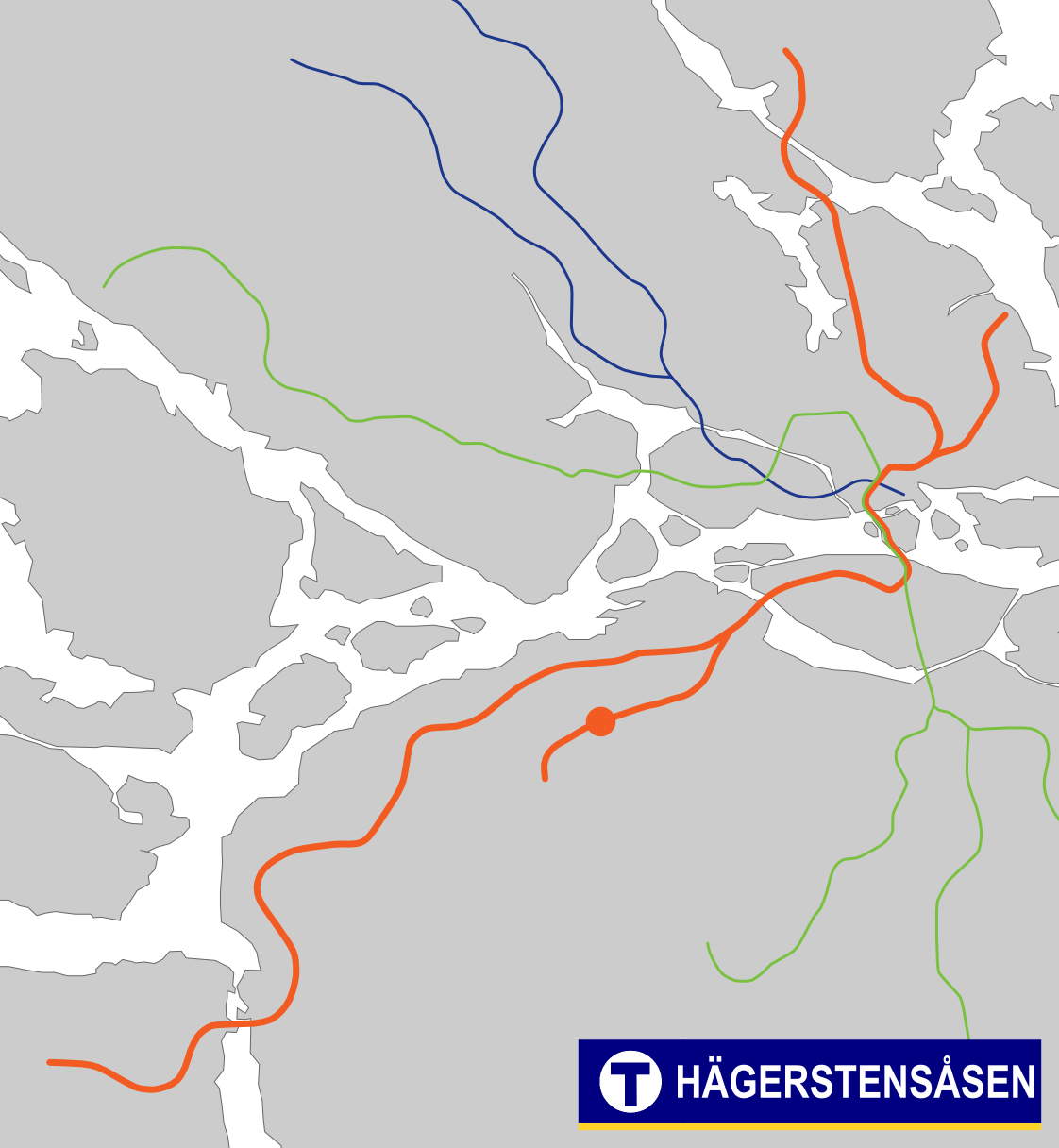

Hägerstensåsen is a station on the Red Line (Line 14) on the Stockholm Metro, located in the Hägerstensåsen, Stockholm City, Sweden..

Hägerstensåsen was opened as a metro station on 5 April 1964, originally known as Personnevägen, as part of the first stretch of the Red Line, which ran between T-Centralen and Fruängen. However it is on a section of the line, between Telefonplan and Fruängen, that was originally built in 1946–1956 as a pre-metro, with short, low-level tram platforms instead of the subway platforms. Before the metro opened, the line was served by routes 14 and 17 of the Stockholm tramway.

At its eastern end, the station is situated in the open air but below street level, transitioning to being on a viaduct to the west, and has two tracks and a single island platform. Trains approach the station from the east in tunnel, and from the west on the viaduct.

There are two separate entrances, each with its own ticket hall and barrier line, at each end of the station platform. The western entrance opens off Skidvägen and is below the platform, whilst the eastern one opens off Sedelvägen and is above the platform. Access to the platform is by stairs, escalators and lifts.

Hägerstensåsen is one of the few Stockholm Metro stations that does not feature any works of art.

== Gallery ==
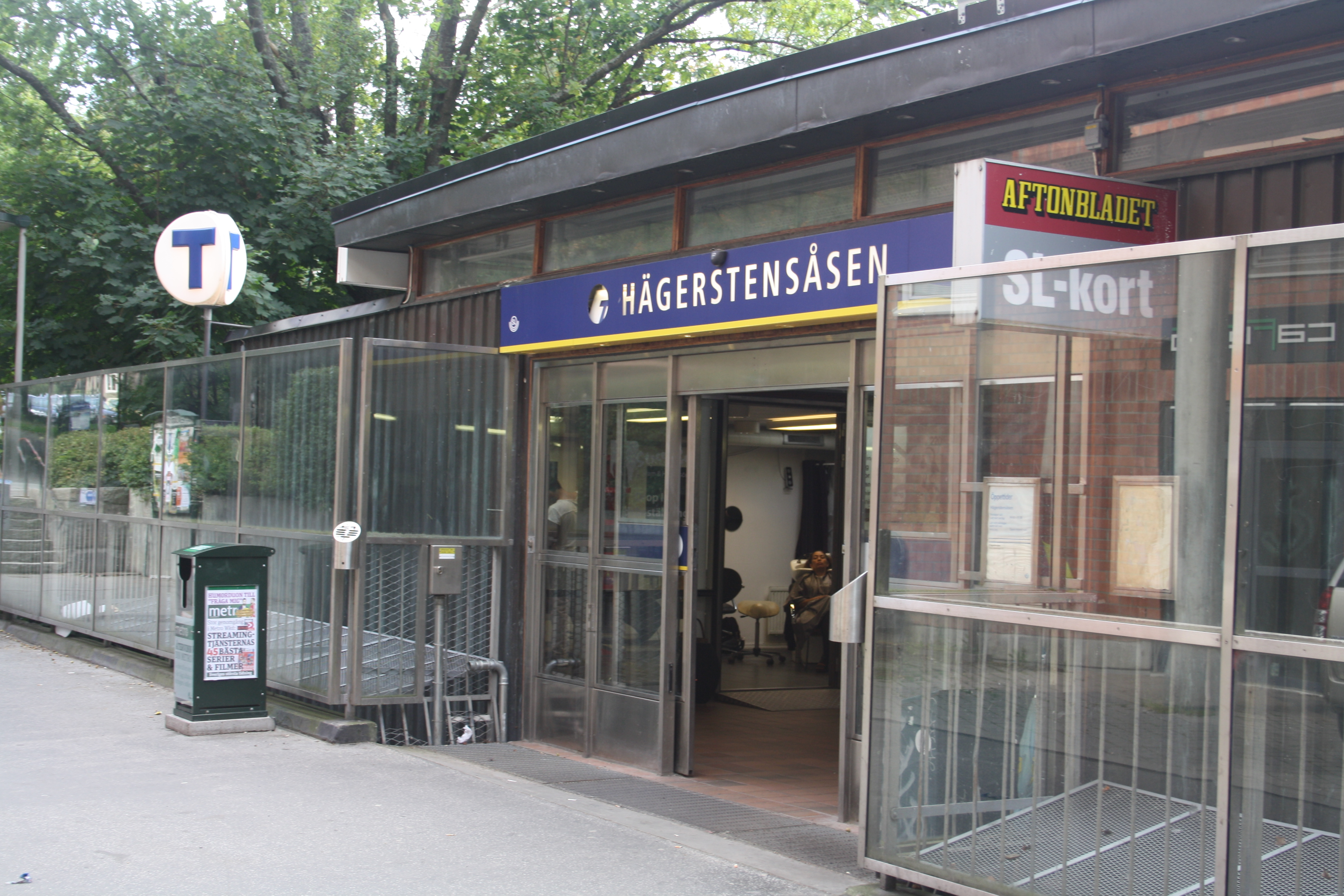
Entrance from Sedelvägen

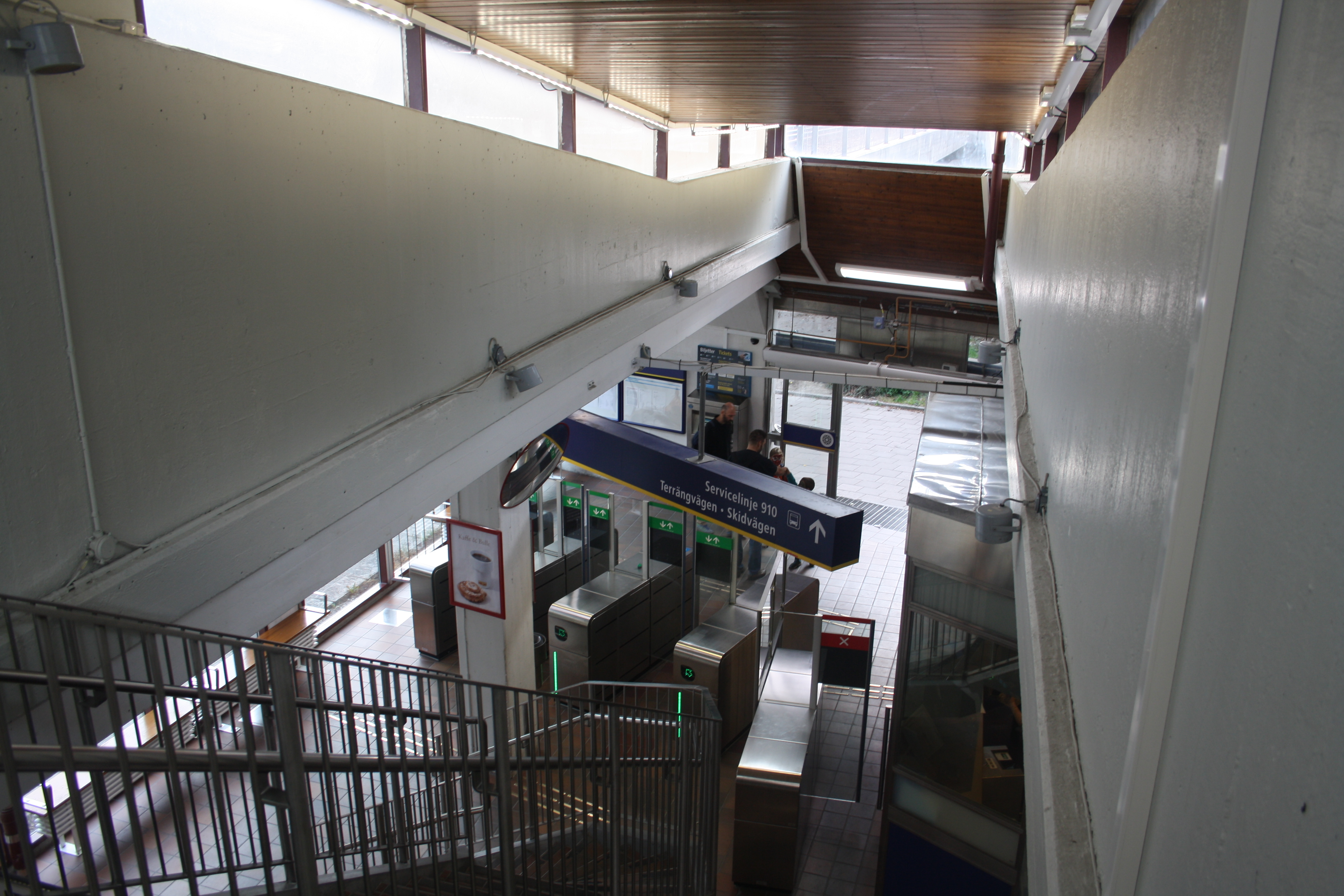
Exit to Skidvägen

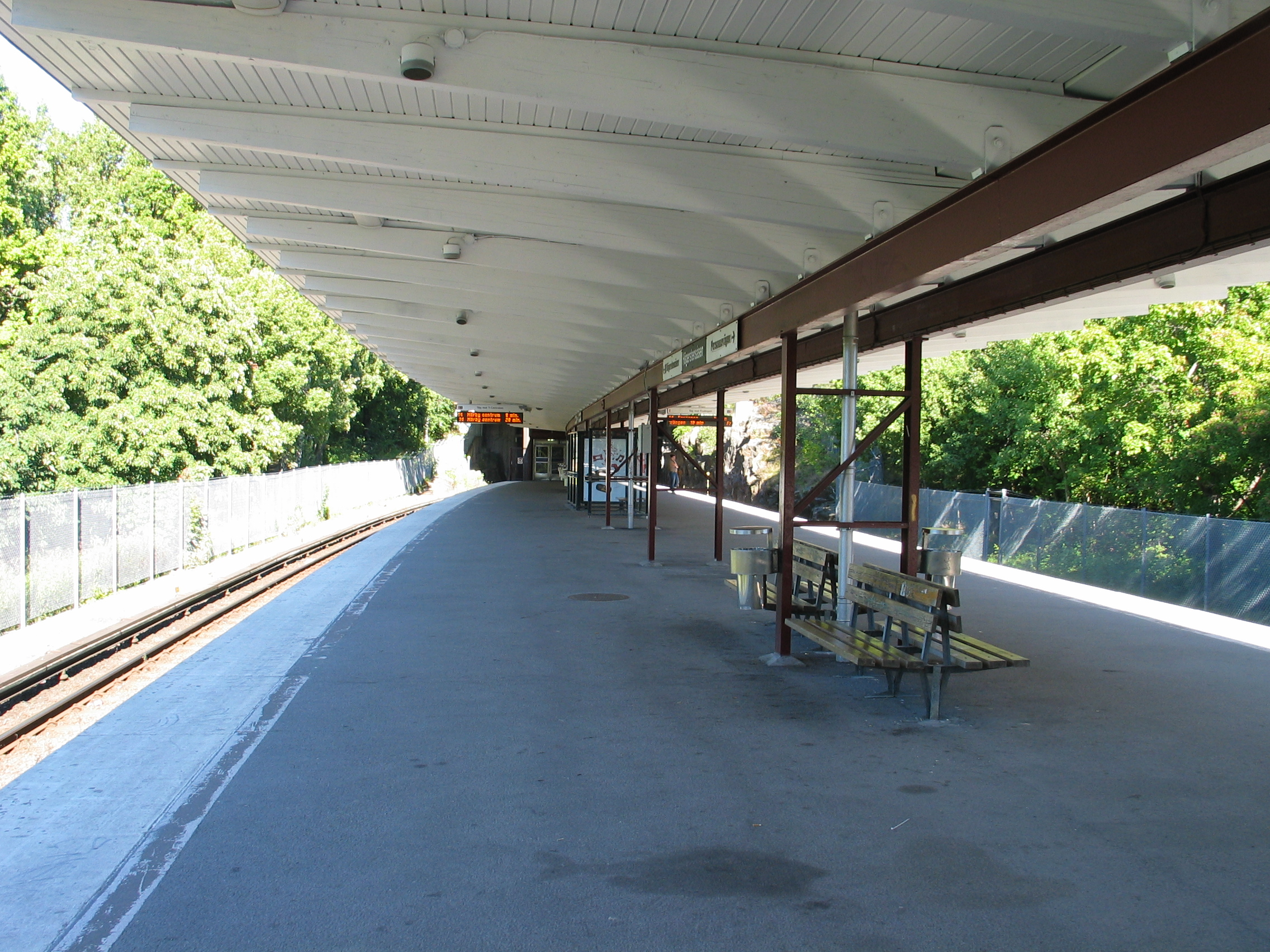
Platform looking east
