= Västertorp metro station =

Stockholm Metro station

Västertorp
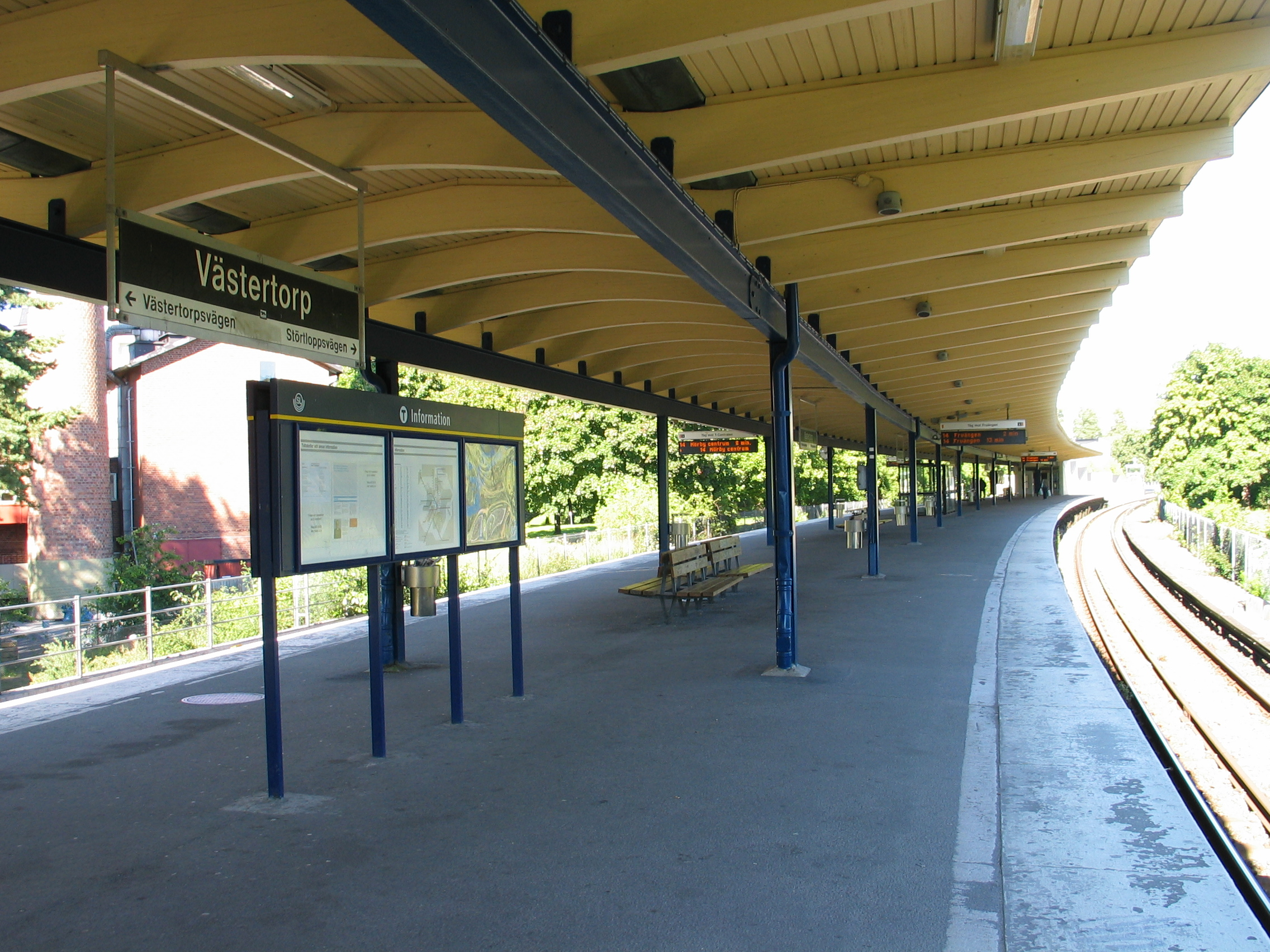

General information
- Coordinates: 59°17′28″N 17°58′0″E
- Elevation: 42.8 m (140 ft) above sea level
- System: Stockholm Metro station
- Owner: Storstockholms Lokaltrafik
- Platforms: 1 island platform
- Tracks: 2

Construction
- Structure type: Elevated
- Accessible: Yes

Other information
- Station code: VÄT

History
- Opened: 5 April 1964; 62 years ago

Passengers
- 2019: 4,050 boarding per weekday

Services
Preceding station	Stockholm Metro	Following station
Fruängen Terminus	Line 14	Hägerstensåsen towards Mörby centrum
Location
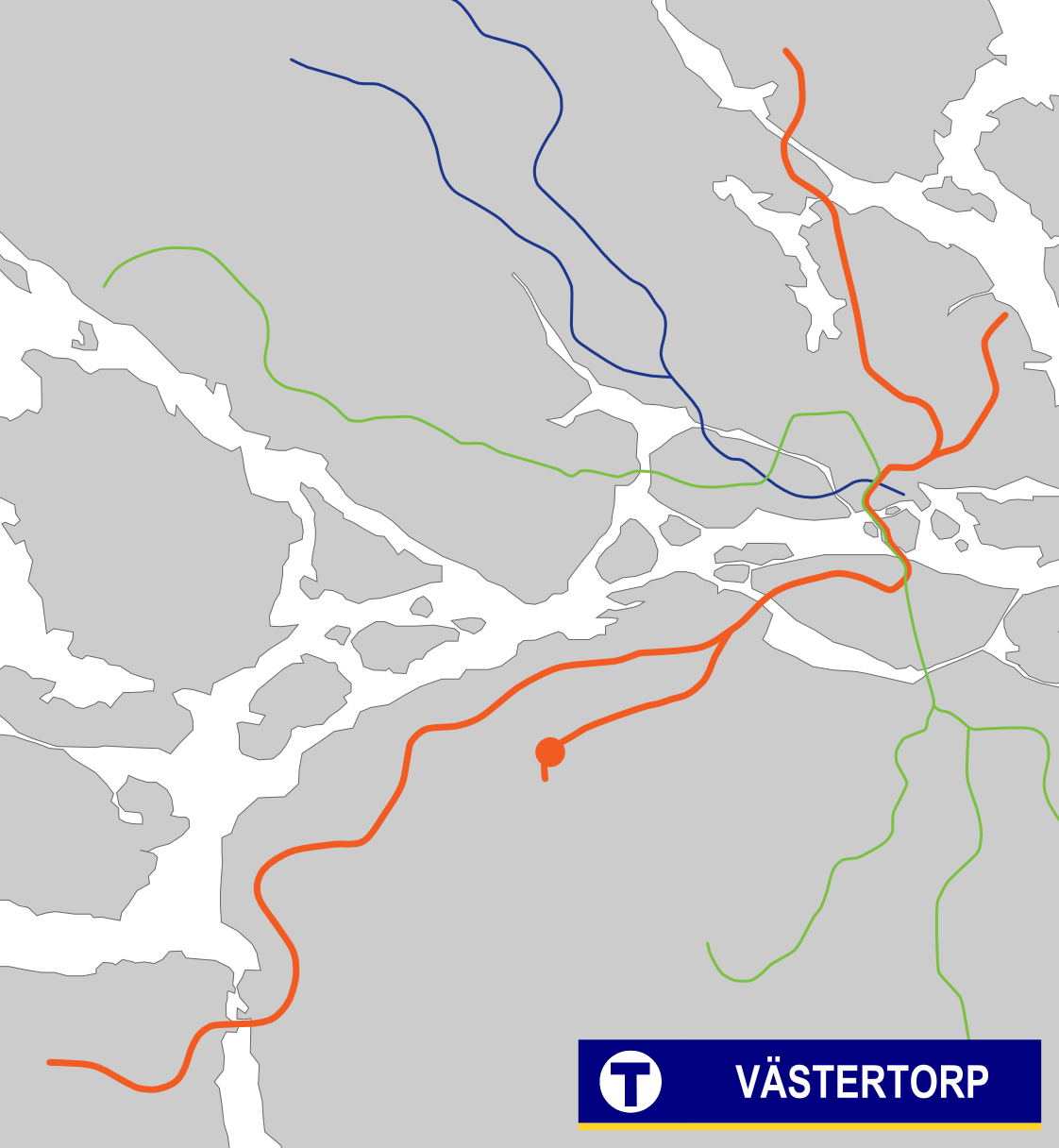

Västertorp is a station on Line 14 of the Red Line of the Stockholm Metro, located in Västertorp, Stockholm City, Sweden.

Västertorp was opened as a metro station on 5 April 1964 as part of the first stretch of the Red Line, which ran between T-Centralen and Fruängen. However it is on a section of the line, between Telefonplan and Fruängen, that was originally built in 1946–1956 as a pre-metro, with short, low-level tram platforms instead of the subway platforms. Before the metro opened, the line was served by routes 14 and 17 of the Stockholm tramway.

The station is situated on a viaduct, and has two tracks and a single island platform. Trains approach the station from both directions on the viaduct.

There are two separate street-level entrances, each with its own ticket hall and barrier line, at each end of the station platform. The western entrance opens off Västertorpsvägen and accesses the platform by stairs and lift, whilst the eastern one opens off Störtloppsvägen and accesses the platform by a ramp and lift.

The station displays sgraffito decoration on the theme of Andrée's Arctic balloon expedition of 1897. The work was created by Jörgen Fogelquist and inaugurated in 1982.

== Gallery ==
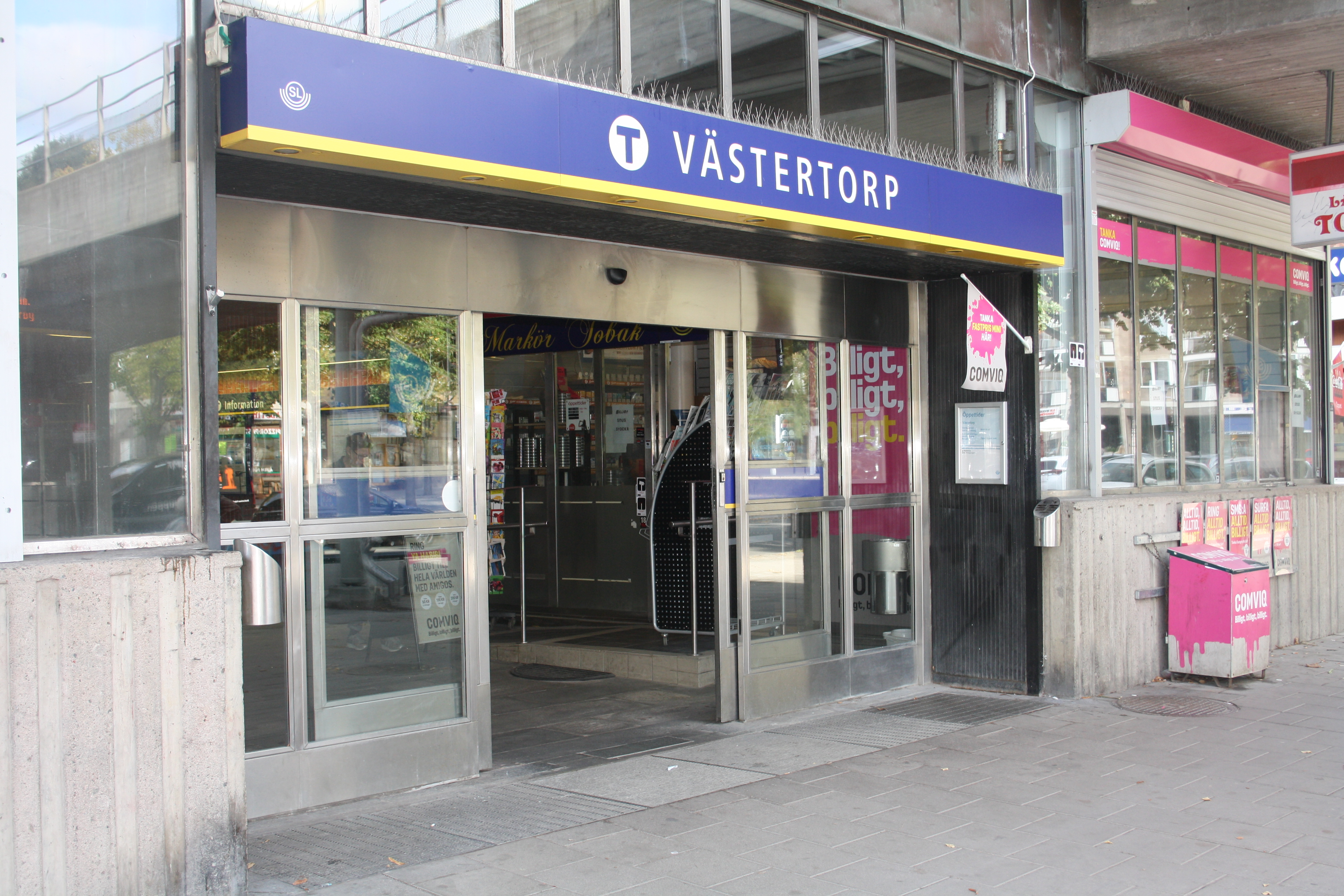
Entrance from Störtloppsvägen

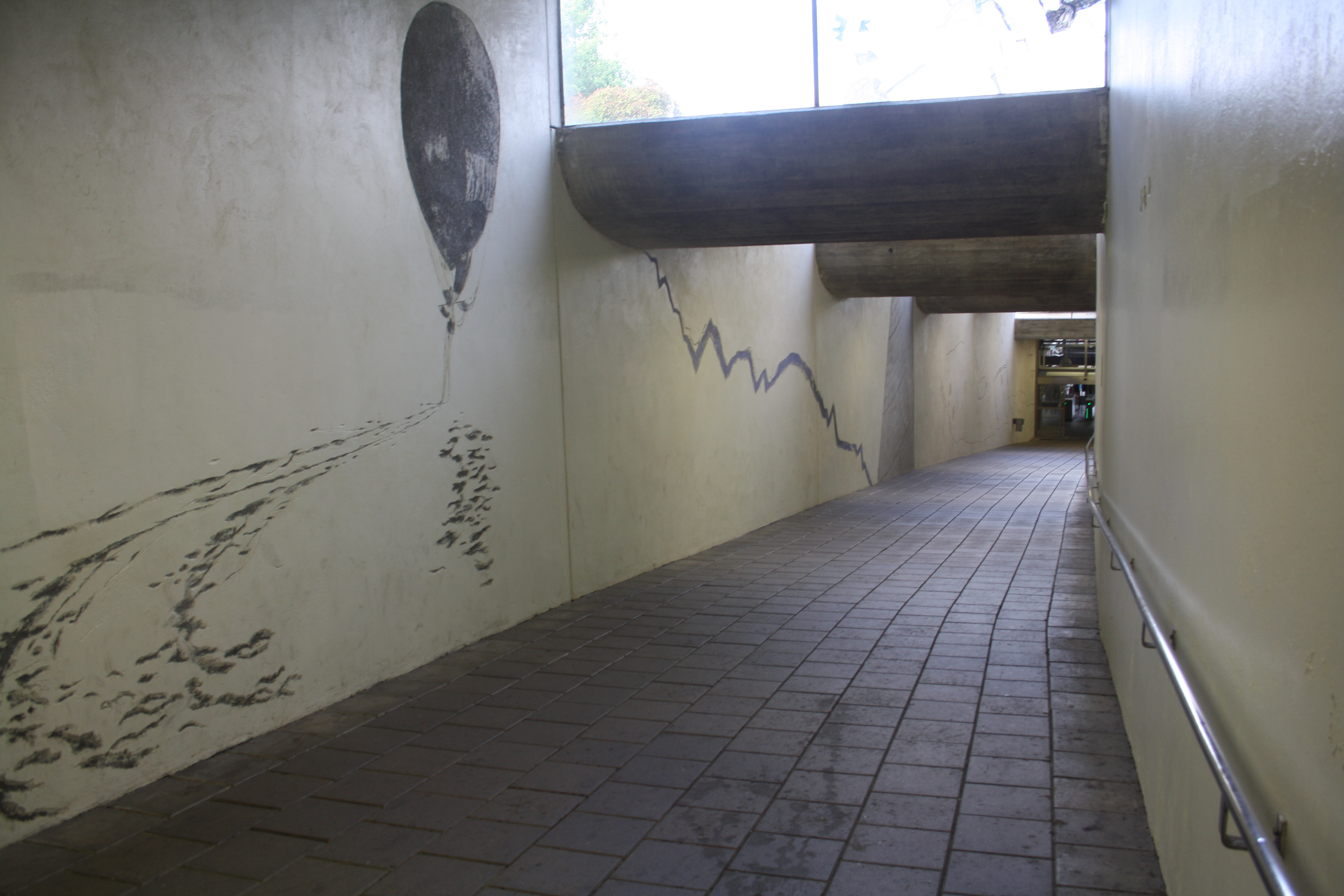
Ramp and art work
