= Hägerstensåsen =

Coordinates: 59°17′44″N 17°58′44″E

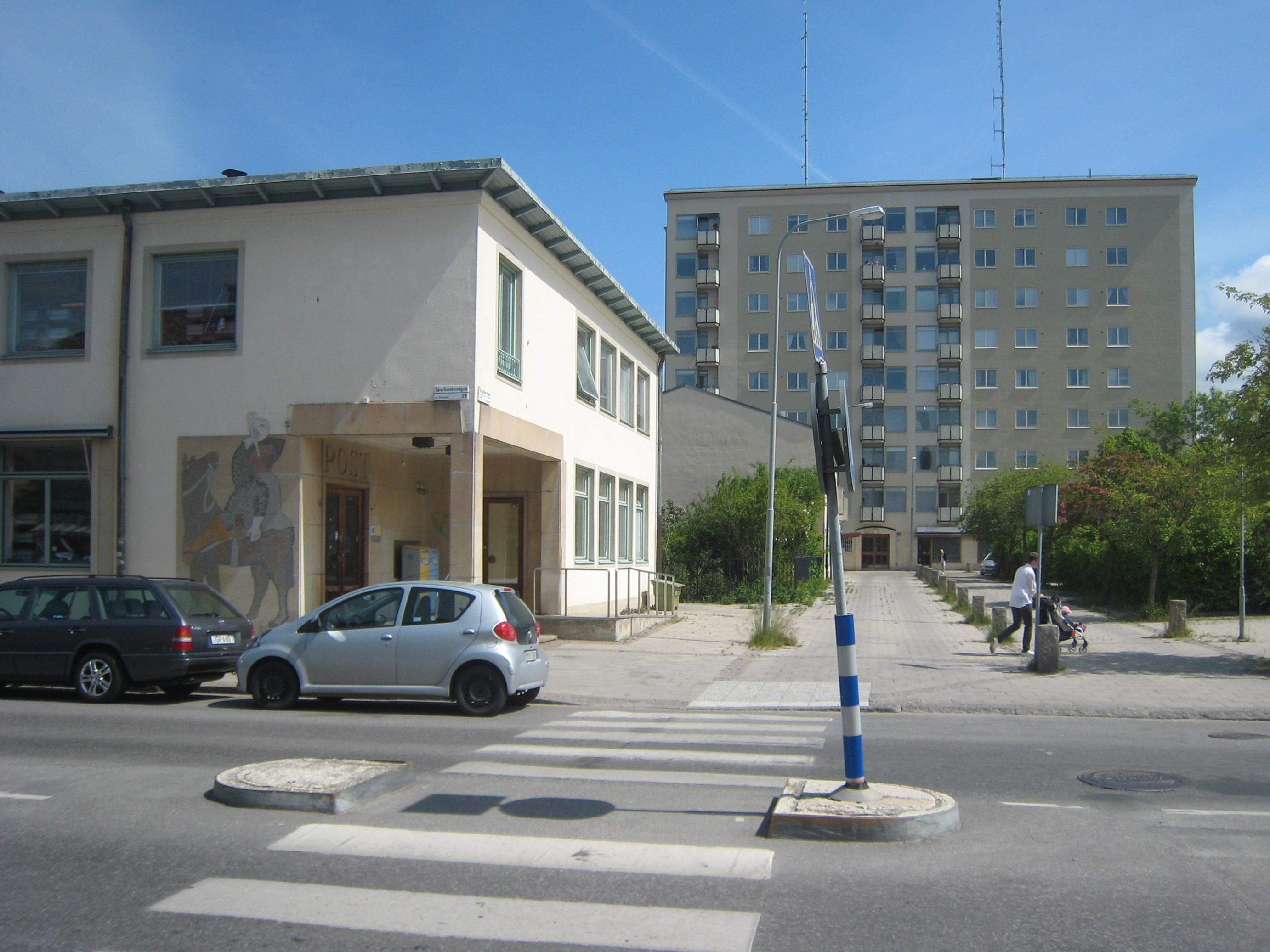
Riksdalertorget ("Riksdaler square").

Hägerstensåsen is a district of the Hägersten-Liljeholmen borough in Söderort, the southern suburban part of Stockholm. It is located 7 km southwest of the capital and has a population of approximately 7,800 inhabitants.

== See also ==
- Hägerstensåsen metro station
