= Eric Grate =

Swedish artist (1896–1983)

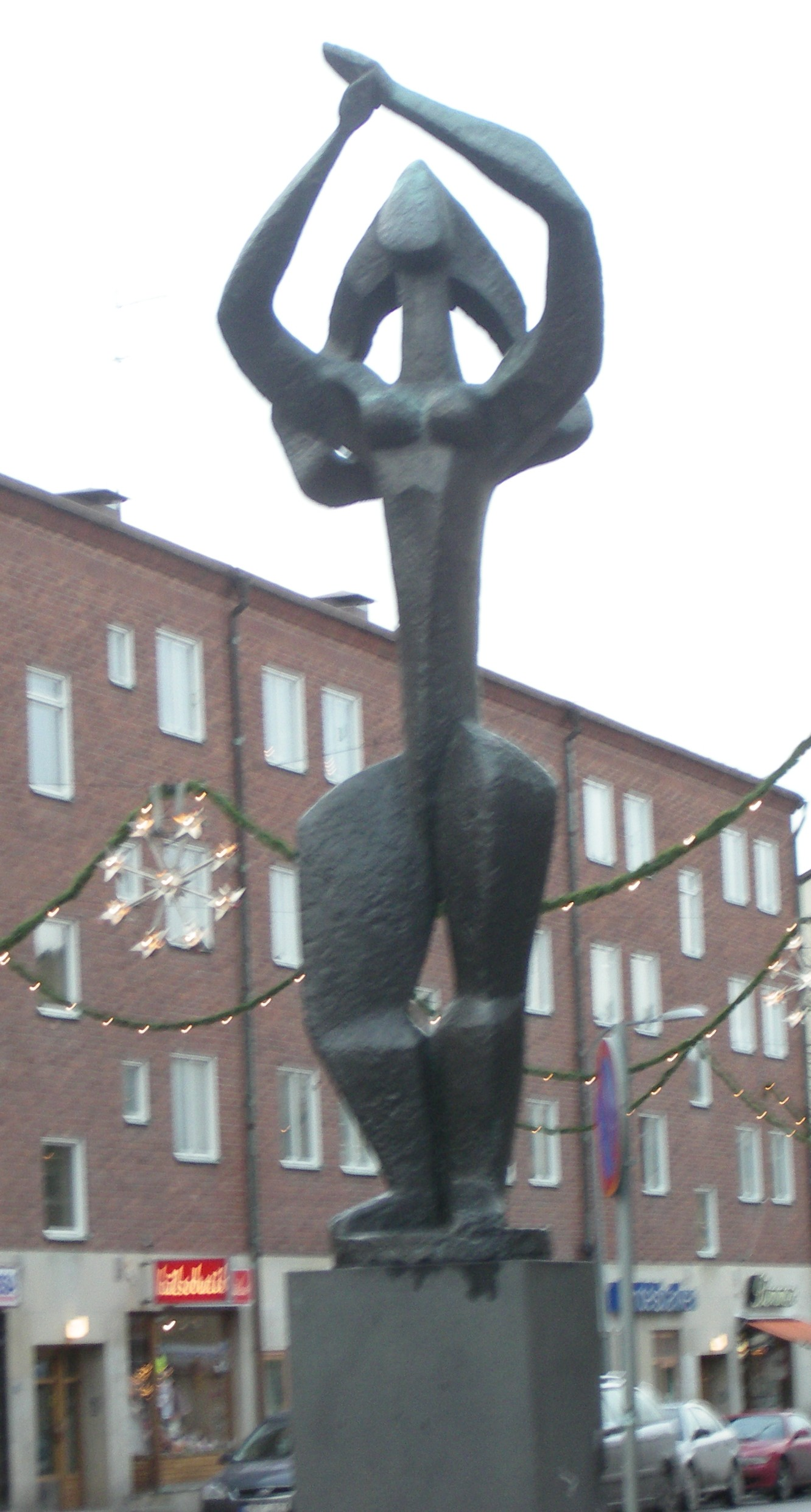
The Tree (Trädet), Västertorp Centre, Stockholm

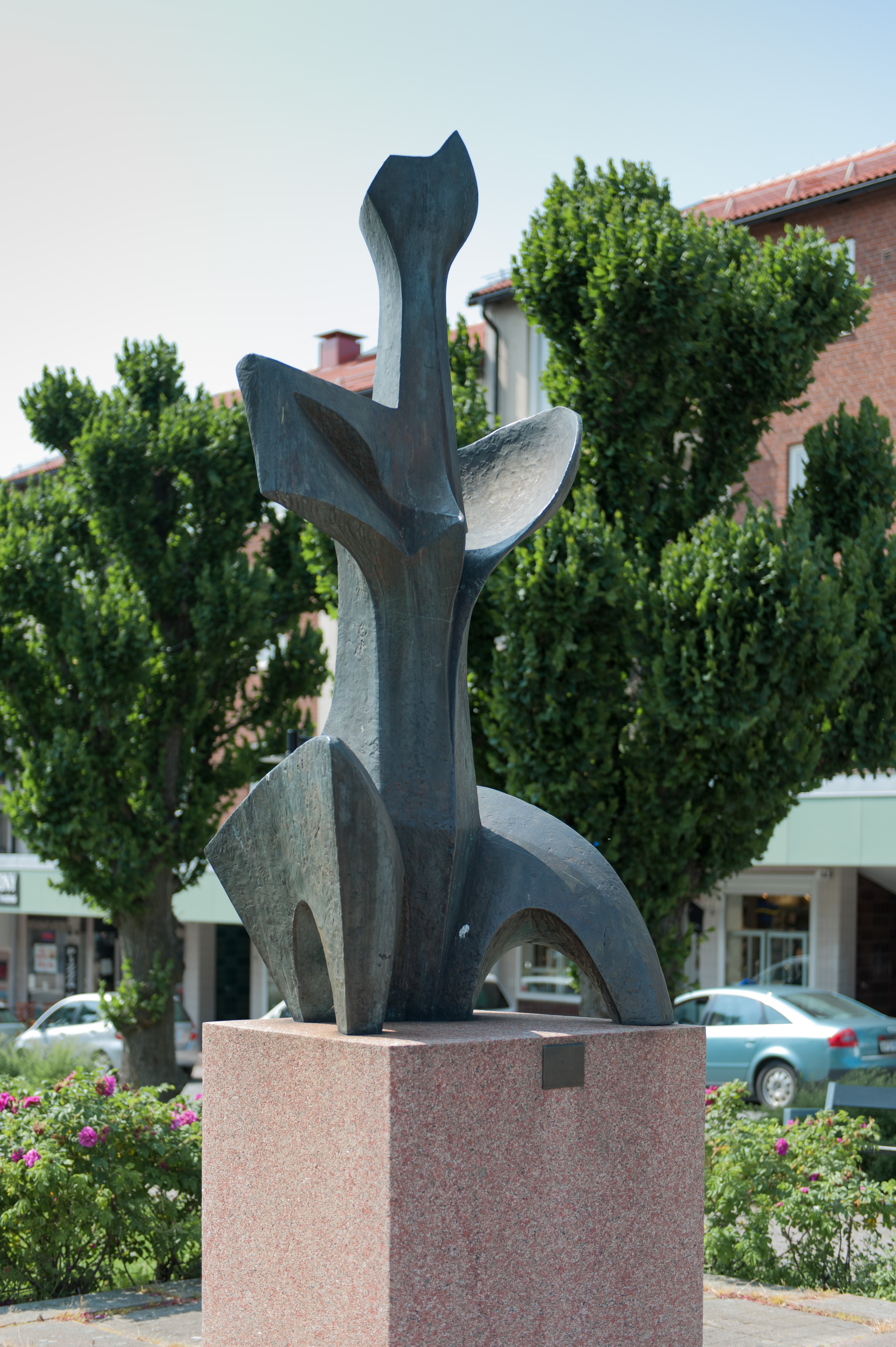
Silvatica, Nässjö

Eric Grate (August 14, 1896 – August 3, 1983) was a Swedish sculptor, painter, graphics artist, and teachers.

== Education ==
Eric Grate studied at the Royal Swedish Academy of Fine Arts in Stockholm between 1917 and 1920. Thereafter he undertook study trips to Germany, especially to Munich, and to Italy and Greece. He moved to Paris in 1924 and stayed there for ten years. In France he lived in the companionship of a number of other Swedish artists, including Nils Dardel, Isaac Grünewald, Sigrid Hjertén, Otto G. Carlsund and Otte Sköld. Between 1941 and 1951 he was a professor at the Royal Swedish Academy of Fine Arts.

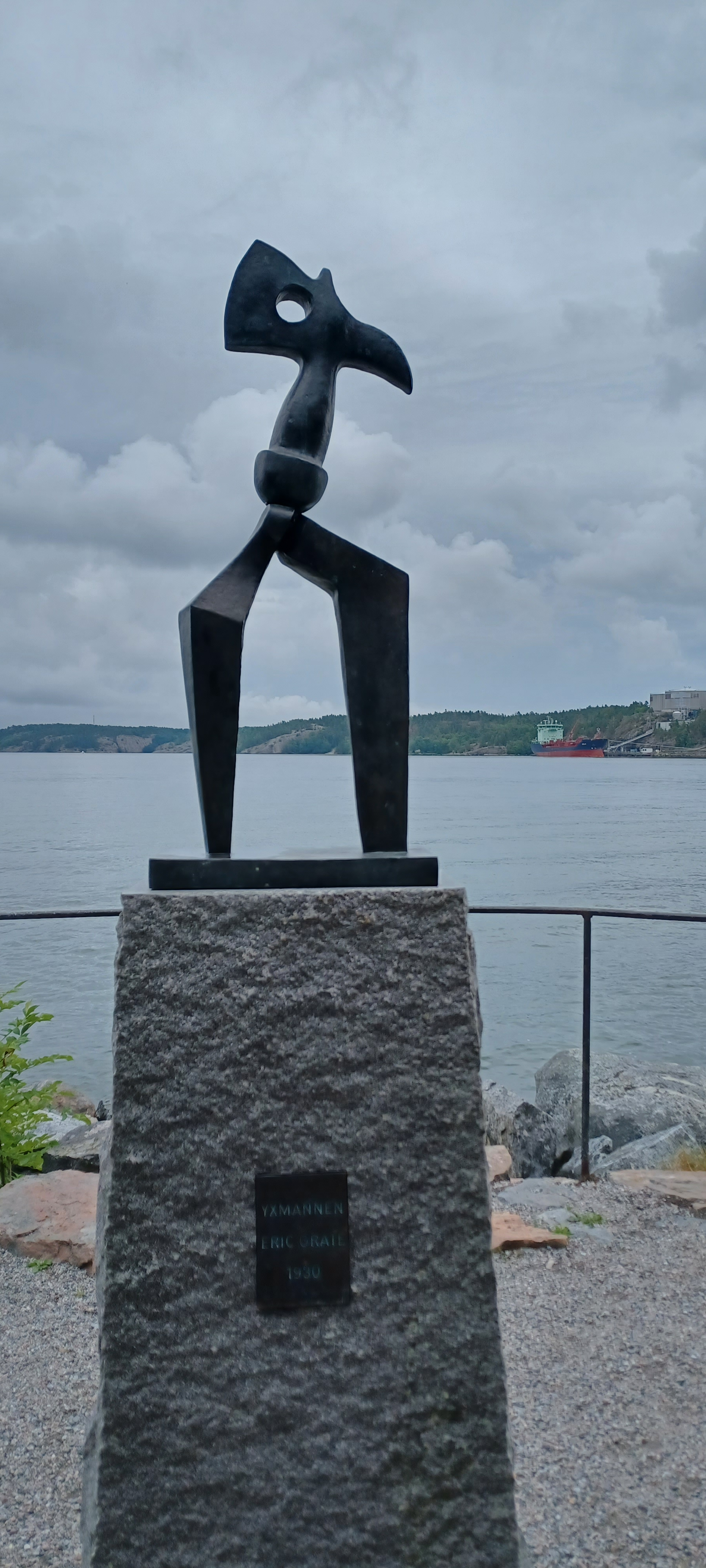
Yxmannen Eric Grate (1930)

Grate has been commissioned for at great number of public works of art in Sweden. The most famous of its time was The Etymological Woman Theft which was erected outside the premises of Karolinska Institutet in Solna, a suburb of Stockholm, towards the end of the 1950s. This heralded the start of one of the fiercest public debates about the arts in Sweden during the 20th century. The majority of the faculty of the Institute protested against the sculpture as indecent and against the ethics of medicine. The controversy was not resolved until a decision by the Swedish Superior Court of Administrative Matters was taken in favour of the sculpture.

I have to admit that, and I do it with a great amount of pleasure, that this first contact with the great Greek sculpture as I experienced it in Olympia, for many years to come was of decisive importance for me. I got a sense that I had to start on a new course in constructing my sculptures. To reassess my whole platform. I believe this meant a catharsis, a way of making the necessary starting points clear.

— Eric Grate, quoted at the age of 78, speaking about his study visit to Greece in his youth

== Public works of art ==
- The Urn of the Mines district iron ore 109 cm in height (1921–22), Gothenburg. This urn was manufactured by Näfvekvarns bruk (Näfvekvarn Iron Works) in a series and has been purchased by a number of Swedish museums
- Faunfigur, Faun figure (1923), Hotel Liseberg, Gothenburg
- Statues at the Norra Kungstornet Building (1925), Kungsgatan in Stockholm
- Yxmannen on Djurgården (1930). Located close to Blockhusudden, Stockholm
- Relief above the entrance of the Art Exhibition Building in Falun (1936)
- Folkvisan, The Folk song (1937), Bromma High School in Stockholm, Liseberg Amusement Park in Gothenburg, Bäckängsgymnasiet in Borås
- Årstiderna, The Seasons limestone (1937–41), Rosenbad (The Government Chancellery), Stockholm
- Folket och tekniken, The People and the Technology, part of a relief in chamotte clay (1937), decoration for the World Exhibition in Paris 1937, Runö Training Centre, Åkersberga
- De fyra vindarna, The Four Winds (1937–41), four reliefs at front of the extension of the City Hall of Gothenburg by Gunnar Asplund
- Badet, The Bath and Nereid two reliefs in terracotta (1943), The City Swimming Hall of Trelleborg
- Sommaren, The Summer or Ung man, Young Man granite 224 cm in height (1944), Lundby, Gothenburg
- Våren, The Spring bronze 125 cm in height (1944), Härlanda, Gothenburg and Museum Park in Alingsås
- Anadyomene (1947–52), Hudiksvall
- Förvandlingarnas brunn, The Fountain of Transformation, granite (1943–55), the Marabou Park in Sundbyberg
- Navigare necesse est bronze 1953, Rödaberg Primary School, Stockholm
- Liggande kvinna, Declining Woman (ca 1954) bronze in a fountain, Västertorp Centre, Stockholm
- Trädet, The Tree (ca 1954) bronze, Västertorp Centre, Stockholm
- Två dansande. Two Dancers (1955), Byttorpskolan (school) in Borås
- Vindarnas grotta, Cave of the Winds (1960–71), outside the City Hall of Västerås by Sven Ahlbom
- Monument över Yxman, Monument over an Axe Man bronze 3.5 m in height (raised 1967), Rålambshov Park, Stockholm. A replica in a minor format is situated at Blockhusudden at Djurgården in Stockholm
- Gudinna vid hyperboreiskt hav, Goddess by an Hyperborean Sea granite in a fountain 4 m long (1949–56), City Hall Square in Gävle.
- Entomologiskt kvinnorov, Entomological Raping bronze (1956–58), Royal Institute of Medicine, Solna
- Snäckfågel, Shell Bird bronze 255 cm in height (1960–61), outside Hotel Opalen, Gothenburg and the Central Square in Eslöv
- Silvatica bronze, the Esplanade in Nässjö
- Nike från Sant Andria, Nike from Sant Andria bronze 206 cm in height (1967–68), outside the Public Library in Norrköping
- Sparvguden, The God of Sparrows (1972–73), Eric Grate's Park outside the City Hall of Solna
- Hjärtblad (1974), Cotyledones, outside the Regional Council Headquarters Building in Kristianstad
