= Telefonplan metro station =

Stockholm Metro station

Telefonplan
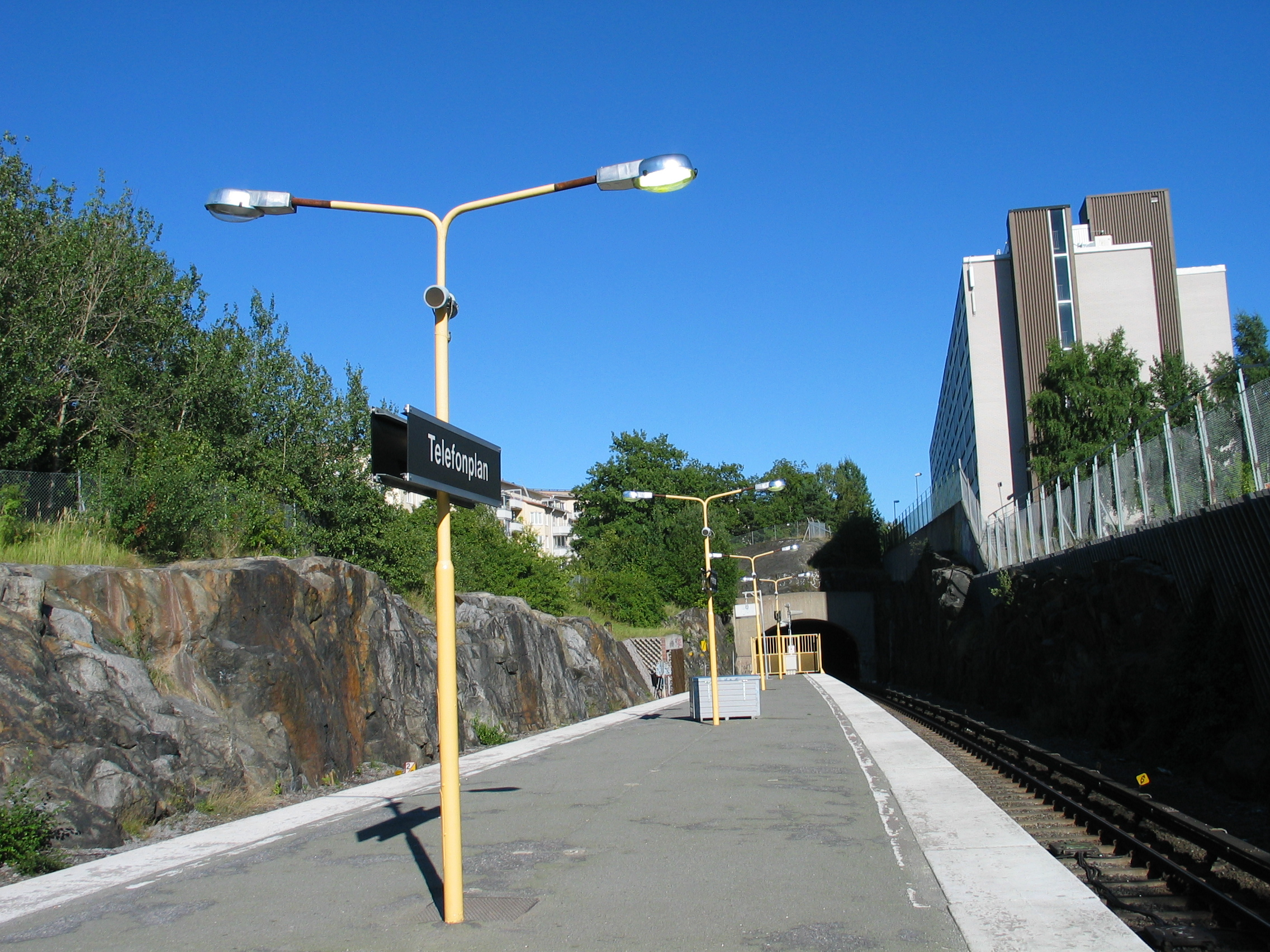
- Platform looking east

General information
- Coordinates: 59°17′53″N 17°59′49″E
- Elevation: 34.3 m (113 ft) above sea level
- System: Stockholm Metro station
- Owner: Storstockholms Lokaltrafik
- Platforms: 1 island platform
- Tracks: 2

Construction
- Structure type: At grade
- Accessible: Yes

Other information
- Station code: TFP

History
- Opened: 5 April 1964; 62 years ago

Passengers
- 2019: 11,400 boarding per weekday

Services
Preceding station	Stockholm Metro	Following station
Hägerstensåsen towards Fruängen	Line 14	Midsommarkransen towards Mörby centrum
Location
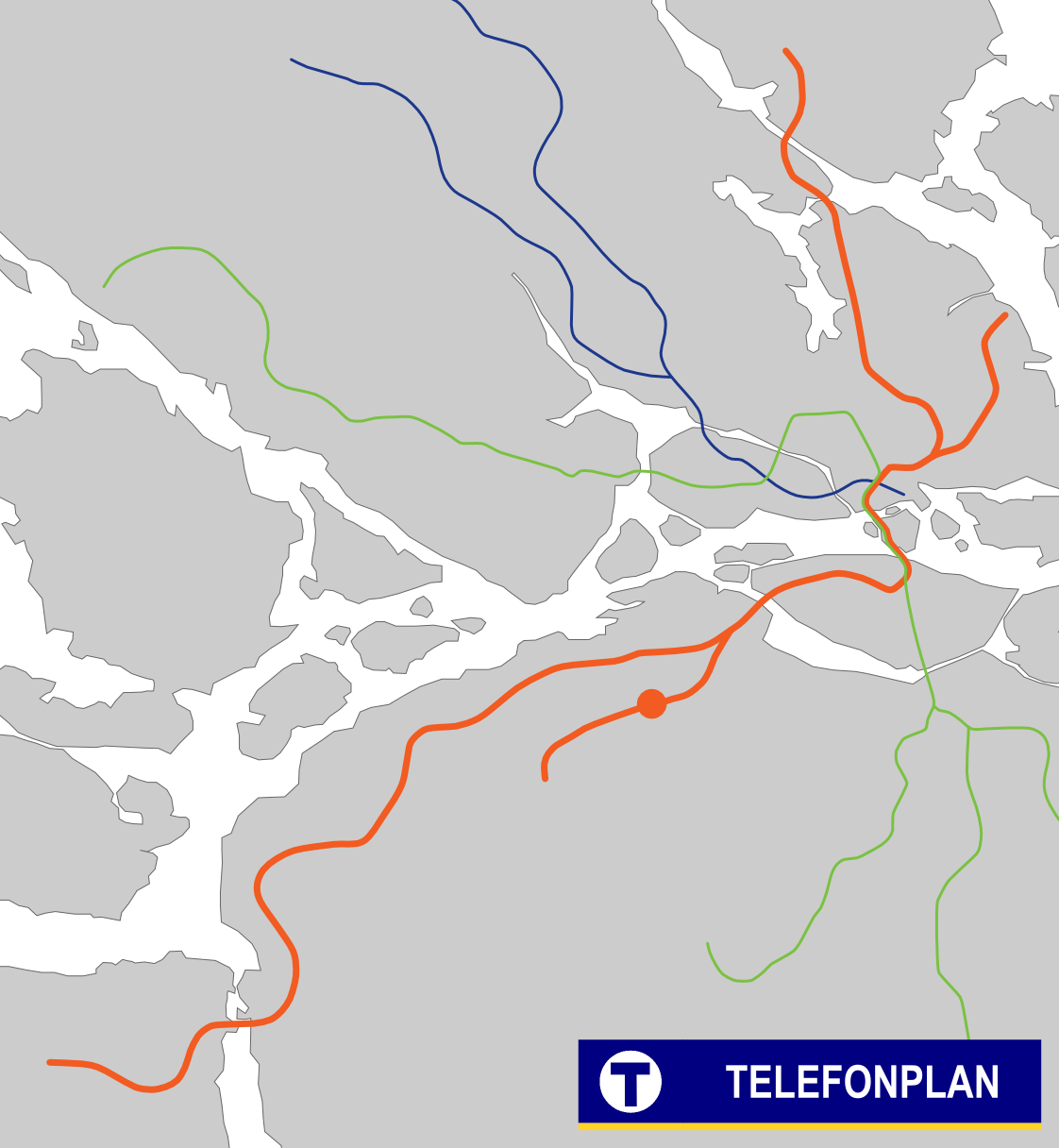

Telefonplan is a station on route 14 of the Red Line of the Stockholm Metro, located in Hägersten, Stockholm, Sweden. The station's name refers to Telefonplan ("Telephone Square"), a small square situated just west of the station's main entrance, which in turn refers to the nearby former site of telephone company Ericsson.

== History ==
Telefonplan was opened as a metro station on 5 April 1964 as part of the first stretch of the Red Line, which ran between T-Centralen and Fruängen. However the Telefonplan to Fruängen section of the line was originally built in 1946–1956 as a pre-metro, with shorter, low-level tram platforms instead of the high-level subway platforms. Before the metro opened, these were served by routes 14 and 17 of the Stockholm tramway.

About 500 m (1,600 ft) to the west of Telefonplan are the remains of the Korpmossevägen station that was built as part of the pre-metro and served by the tram service, but never converted into a full metro station.

== Operation ==
The station is situated in a shallow rock cutting just below street level, and has two tracks and a single island platform. There is a single ticket hall, above the tracks at the western end of the platforms and accessed directly from the street. Access to the platforms is via stairs, escalator and lift.

To the east of Telefonplan, the tracks enter a tunnel to Midsommarkransen, whilst to the west they follow a largely surface alignment to the terminus at Fruängen. Immediately to the west there is a central turnback siding, whilst beyond that are the remains of the Korpmossevägen pre-metro station.

== Local area ==
The subway station initially mainly served the headquarters and main factory of telephone company Ericsson, together with the nearby serviced apartments of its workers. Ericsson's headquarters moved to Kista in 2003. Nowadays, the facilities of the factory have been taken over by the Konstfack University College of Arts, and there are plans to build a design center close to the station.

The area immediately east of the station is partially a construction site for new residential buildings, and plans to reconstruct the underground station as well as the whole area of Telefonplan are well developed. There were plans to build two skyscrapers named Tellus Towers, which would have had an entrance from the metro station. This plan is being reevaluated as of 2020.

Indie music club Landet is situated a few hundred meters from the station, making the station and the area more crowded at nighttime than ever before.

The station also serves the inhabitants of Västberga, and buses to closely situated to Solberga and Älvsjö start from here.

== Art ==
The station displays a ceramic wall decoration by Bo Samuelsson, dating from 1997, where the word "Telefonplan" is rendered in morse code as a connection to the telecommunications history of the area. Additionally screen printed pictures are displayed along the wall of the ramp.

== Gallery ==
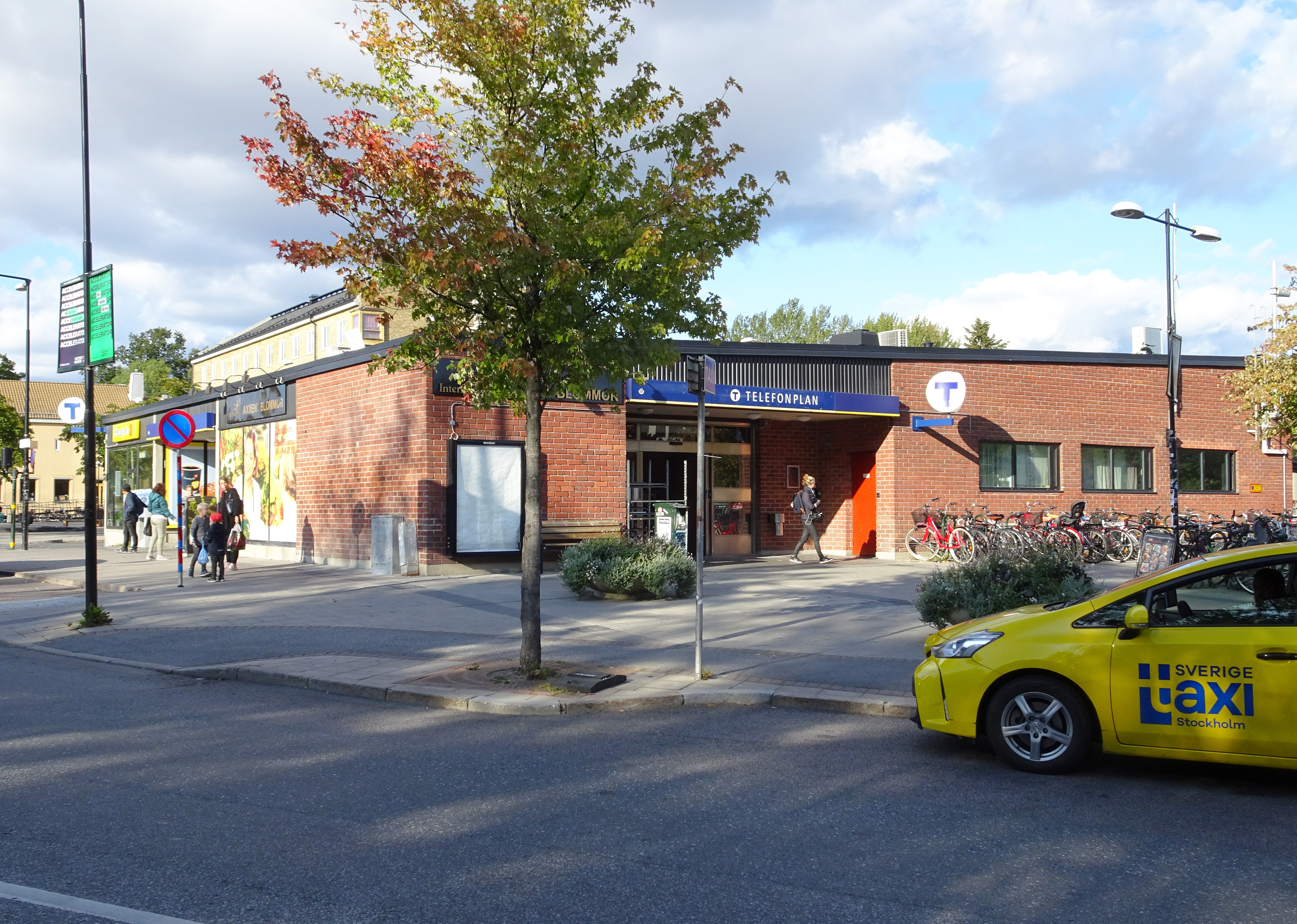
The station entrance

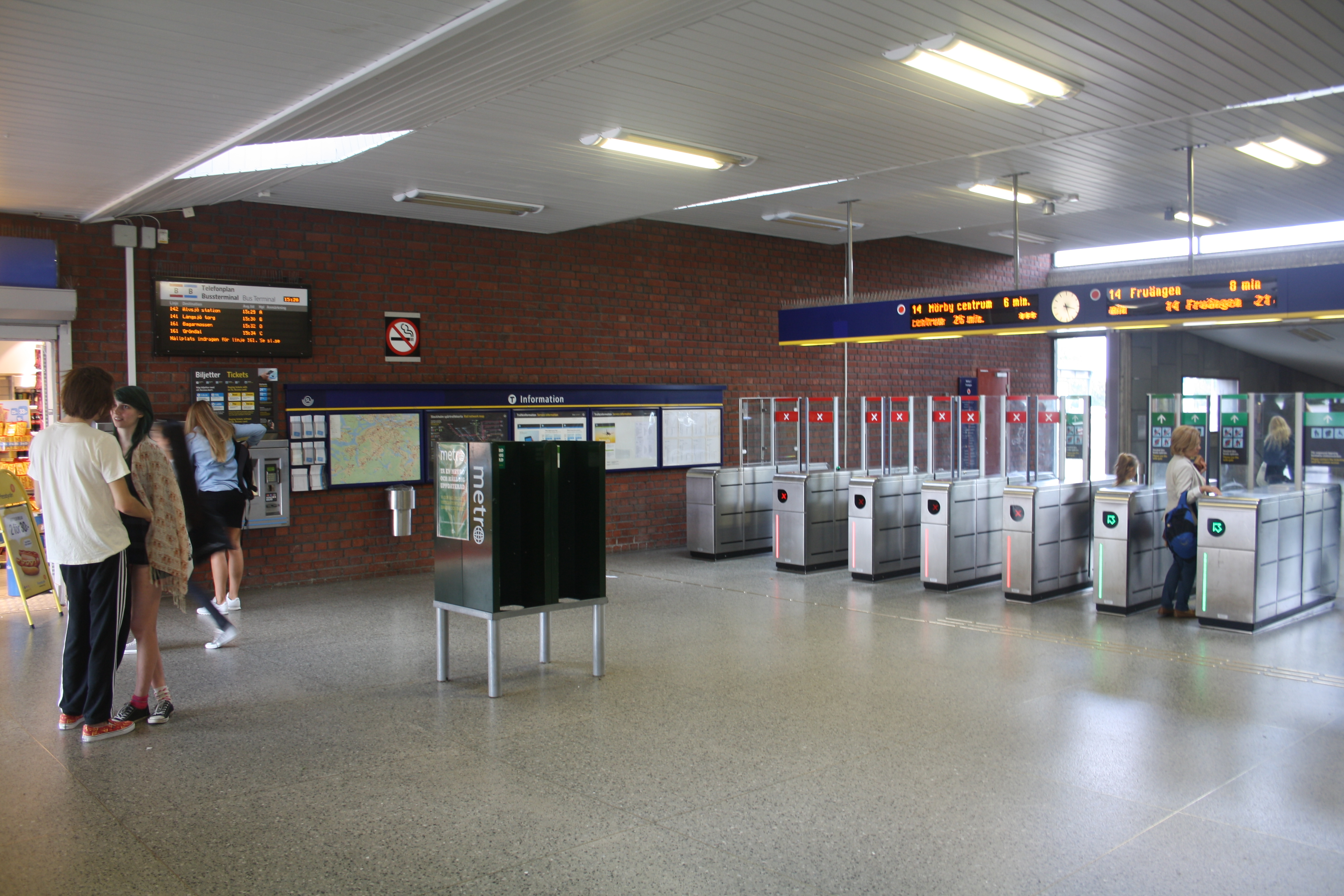
Ticket hall and barrier line

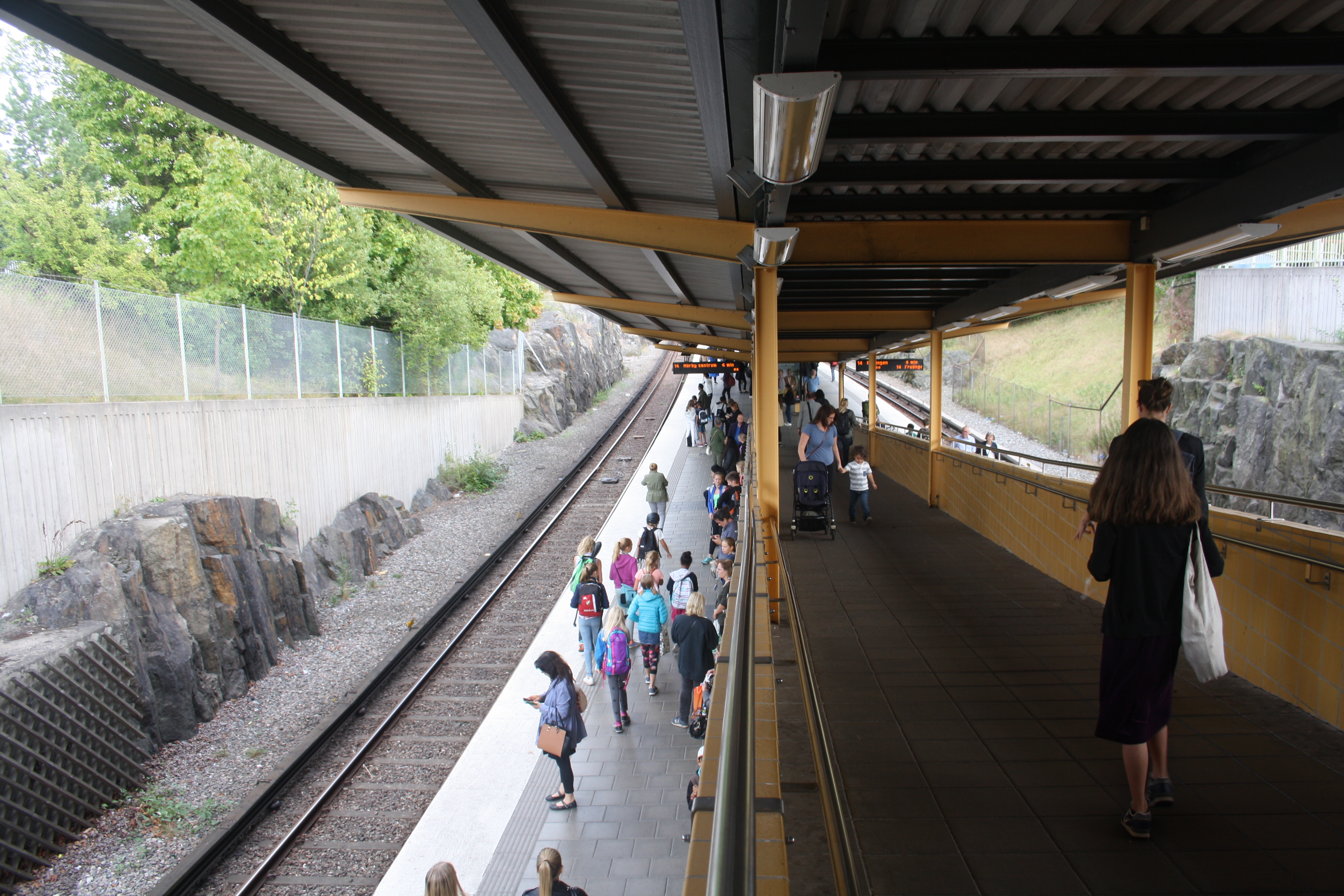
Access to platform

Art work by Bo Samuelsson
