= Stig Blomberg =

Swedish sculptor

Olympic medal record

Art competitions
| Bronze medal – third place | 1936 Berlin | Statues |

Stig Blomberg (October 16, 1901 – December 19, 1970) was a Swedish sculptor. He was born in Linköping.

In 1936 he won a bronze medal in the art competitions of the summer Olympic Games for his "Brottande pojkar" ("Wrestling Youths"). In 1956 he was awarded the Prince Eugen Medal for sculpture.

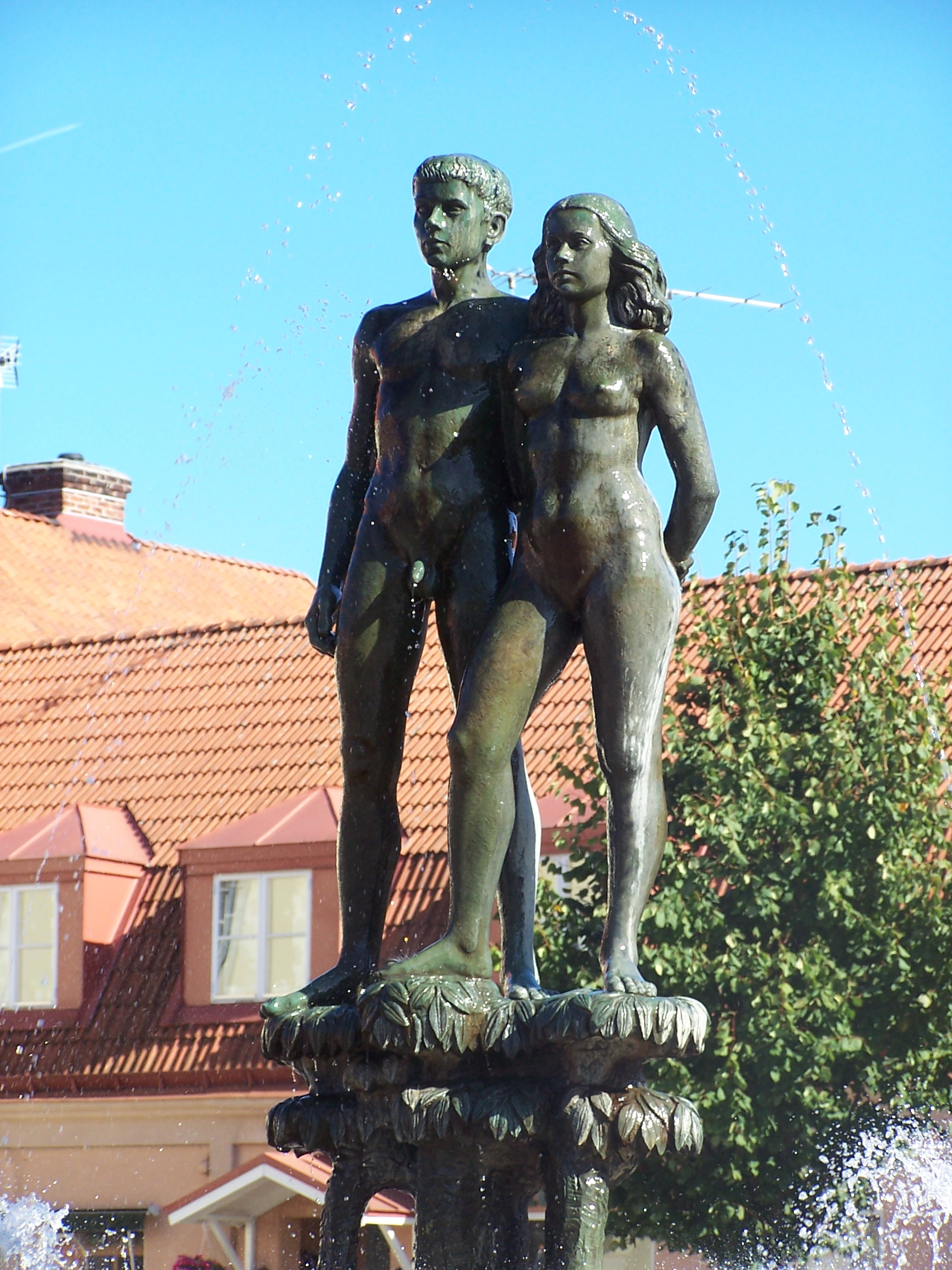
"Ask och Embla" (1948) by Stig Blomberg. In Sölvesborg, Sweden. Photo by Henrik Sendelbach.

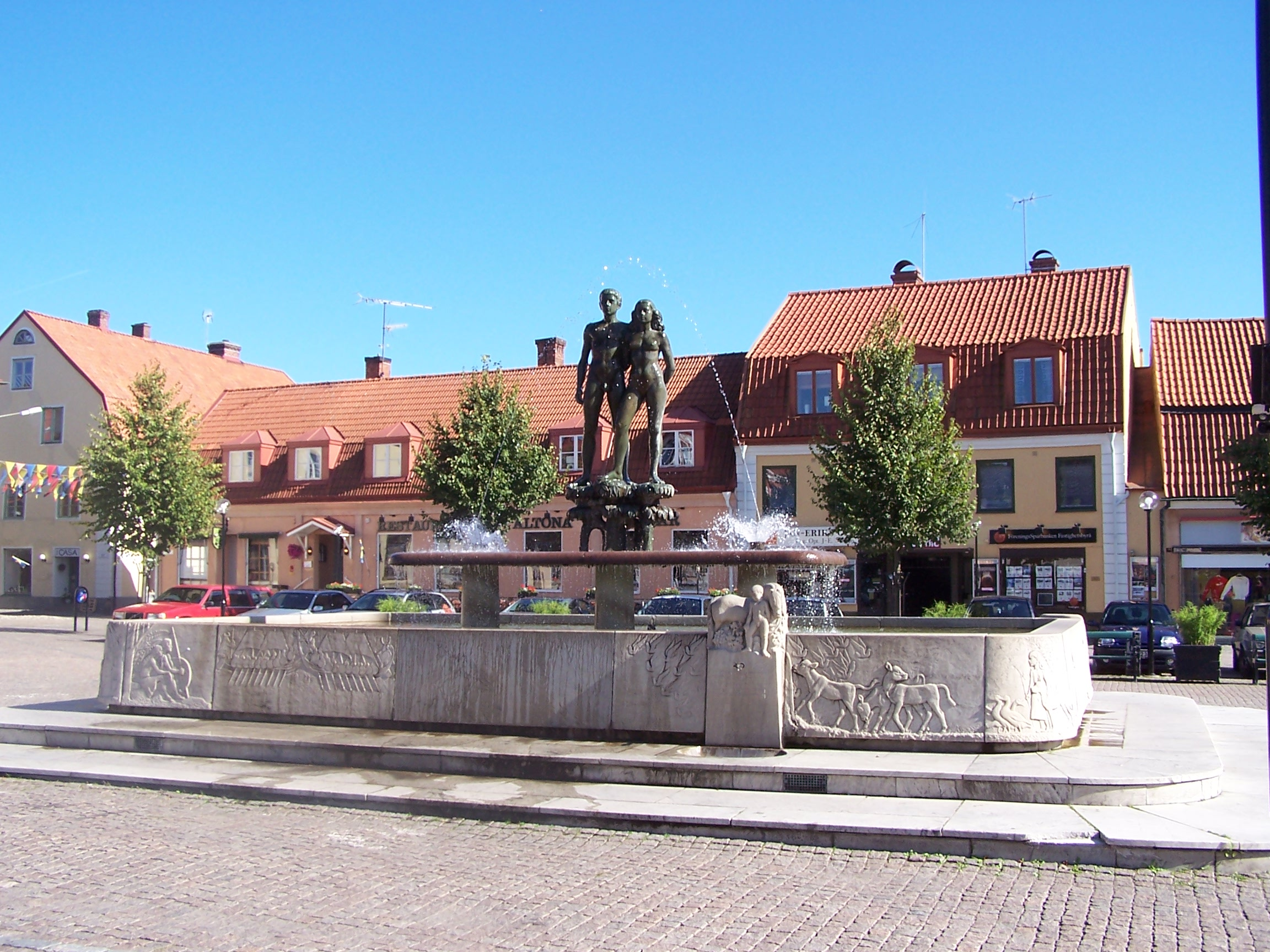
Image from Sölvesborg, a 1948 fountain of Ask and Embla, two characters of Norse mythology.

== See also ==
- Art competitions at the 1936 Summer Olympics
