= Fruängen metro station =

Stockholm Metro station

Fruängen
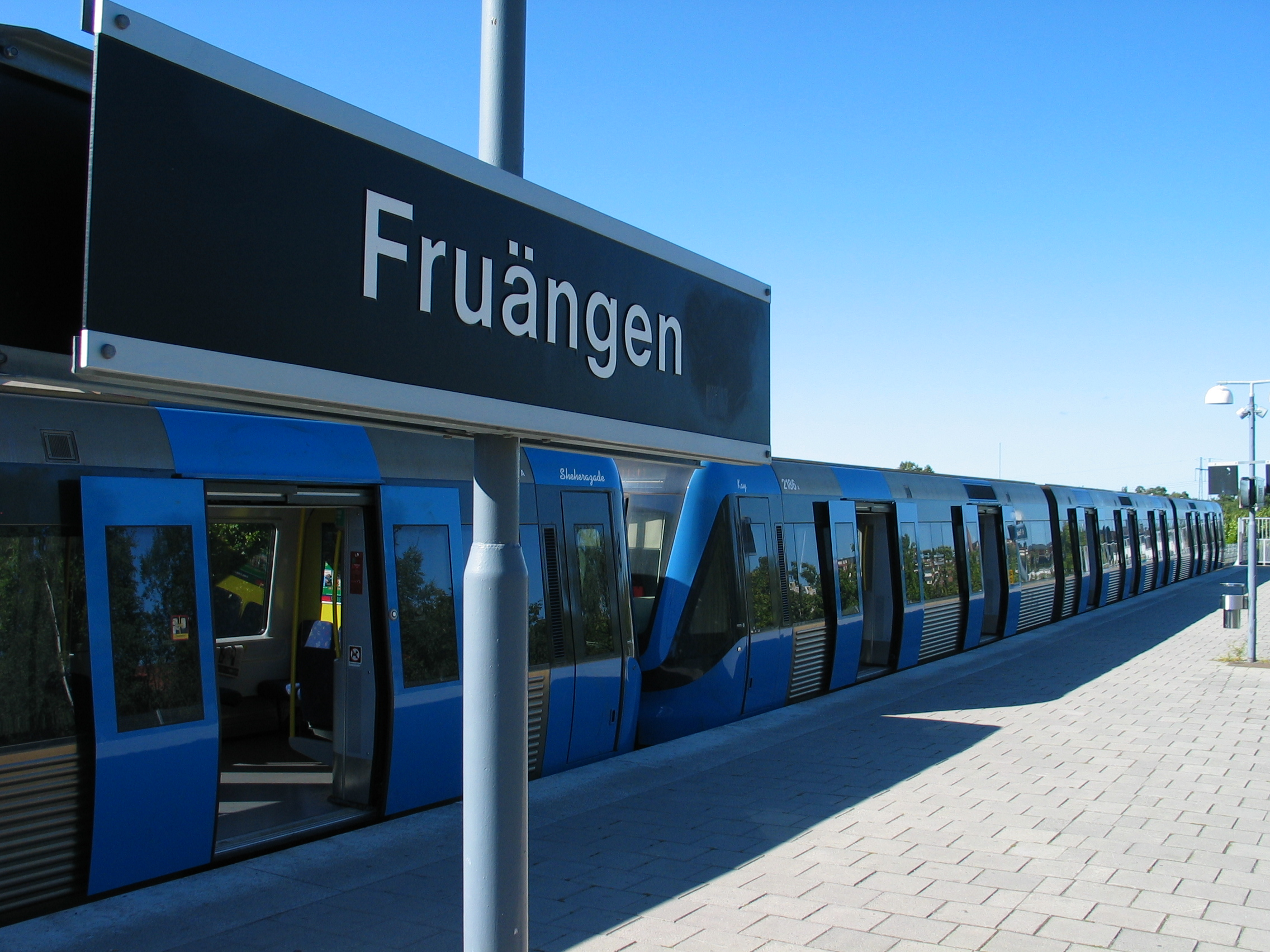
- Station platform

General information
- Coordinates: 59°17′09″N 17°57′54″E
- Elevation: 46.8 m (154 ft) above sea level
- System: Stockholm Metro station
- Owner: Storstockholms Lokaltrafik
- Platforms: 1 island platform
- Tracks: 2

Construction
- Structure type: Elevated
- Accessible: Yes

Other information
- Station code: FRÄ

History
- Opened: 5 April 1964; 62 years ago

Passengers
- 2019: 9,800 boarding per weekday

Services
Preceding station	Stockholm Metro	Following station
Terminus	Line 14	Västertorp towards Mörby centrum
Location
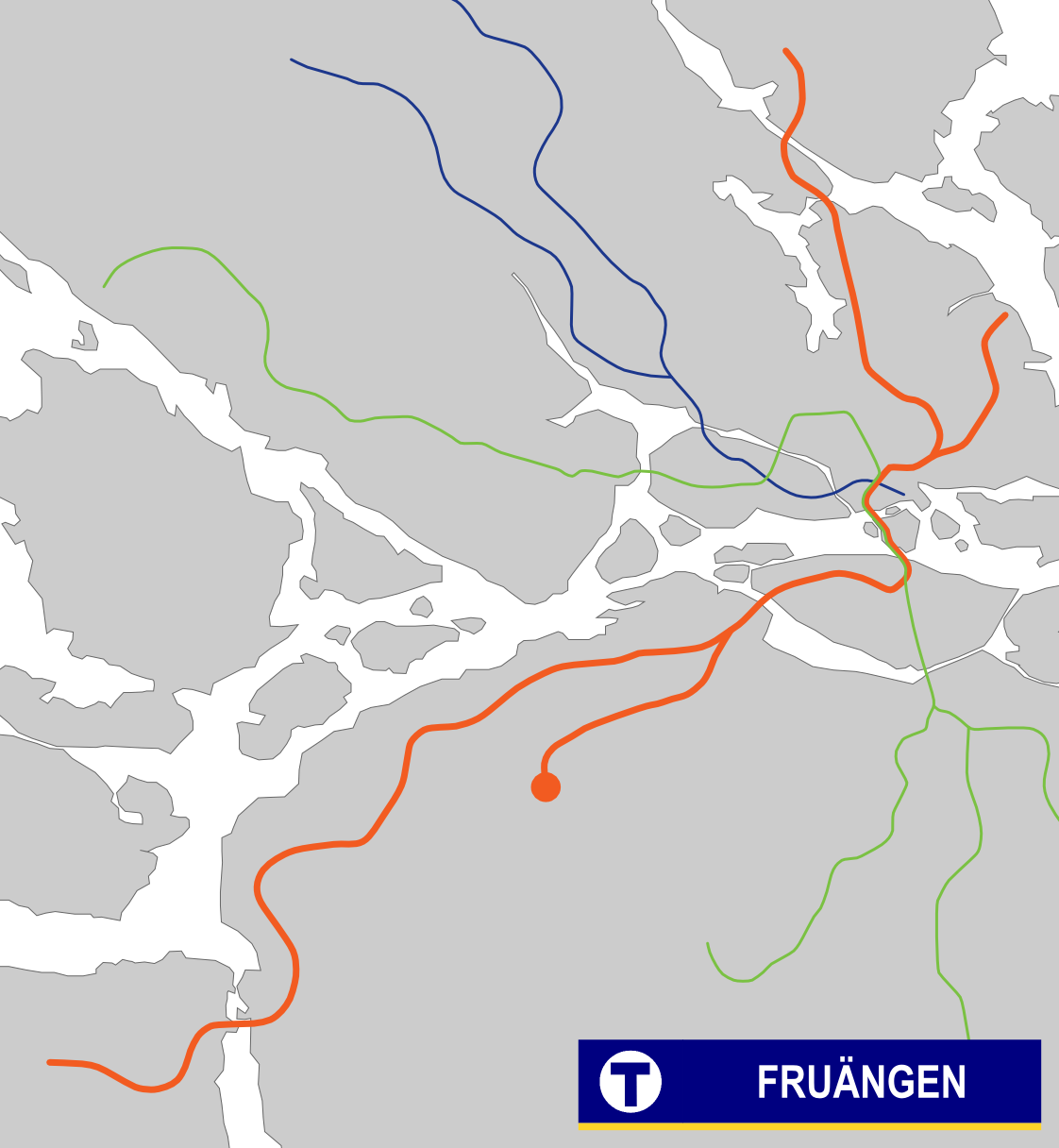

Fruängen is the terminus station on Line 14 of the Red Line of the Stockholm Metro, located in Fruängen, Stockholm City, Sweden. With the station platform situated at 46.8 m (154 ft) above sea level, Fruängen is the highest metro station in the Stockholm Metro network. It is 8.1 km (5.0 mi) from Slussen.

Fruängen opened as a metro station on 5 April 1964 as the southern terminus of the first section of the Red line from T-Centralen. However the section of the line from Telefonplan was originally built in 1946–1956 as a pre-metro served by routes 14 and 17 of the Stockholm tramway. In Fruängen's case, these used a terminal loop, with low-height platforms, to the east of the current station.

The station is situated above ground level, and has a single island platform, with two flanking terminal tracks and a further siding to the east. There is a single platform-level ticket hall and barrier line at the southern and terminal end of the station. This is reached from a single street entrance in Fruängstorget by stairs, escalator and lift. The entrance is next to the Fruängen shopping center and the bus terminal.

The station displays glass mosaics created by Fredrik Landergren in 2005. These comprise a large face above the stairs in the ticket hall and seven images of human heads along a wall at the bus terminal, all embedded in a checkered tile background.

When the station was built, there were plans to extend the Fruängen branch to Huddinge centrum, Huddinge Hospital and Flemingsberg. Land for the right-of-way was protected, but no work has ever been done.

== Gallery ==
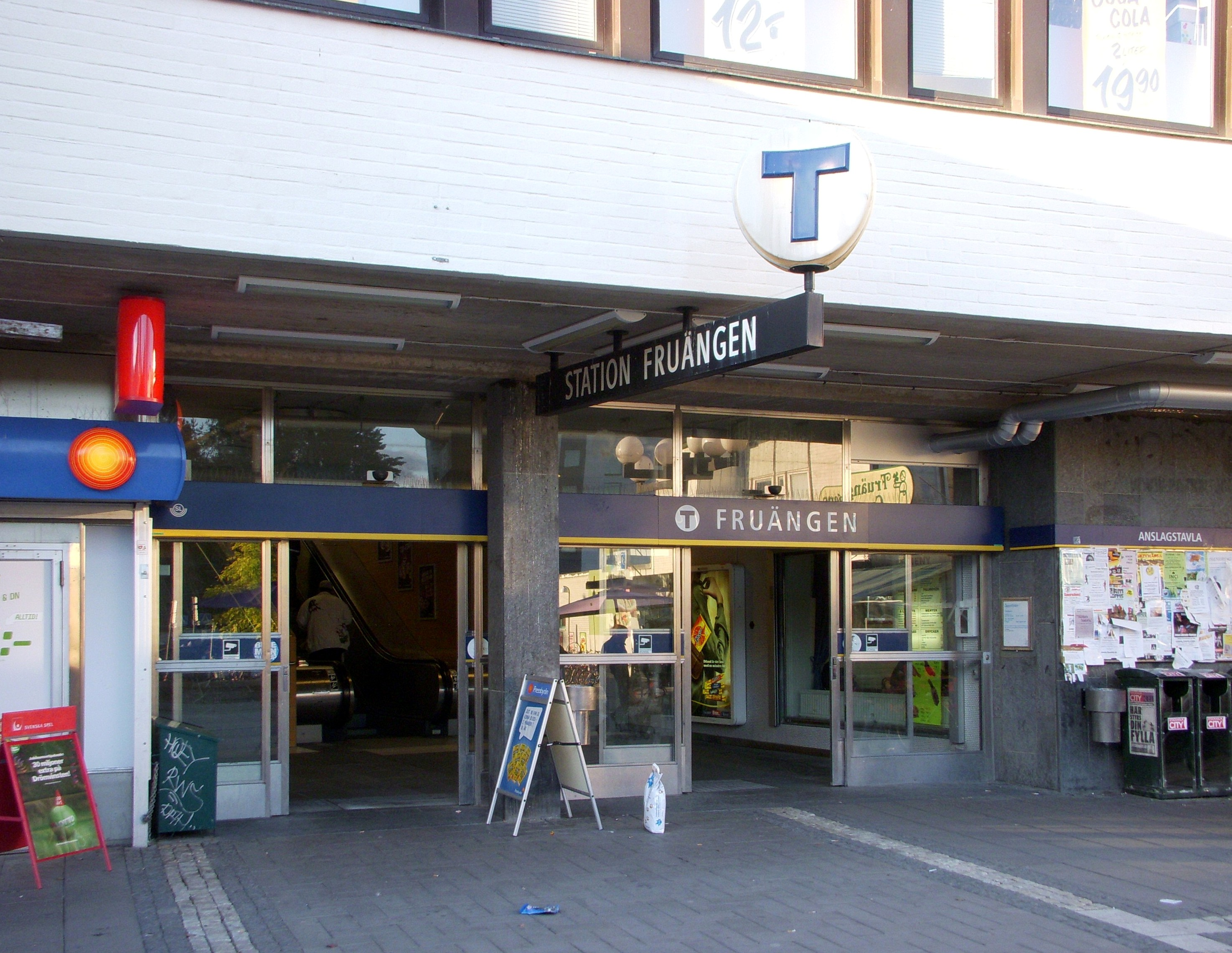
Entrance

Stairs and lift from entrance, with art work

Ticket hall and barriers, with platforms beyond

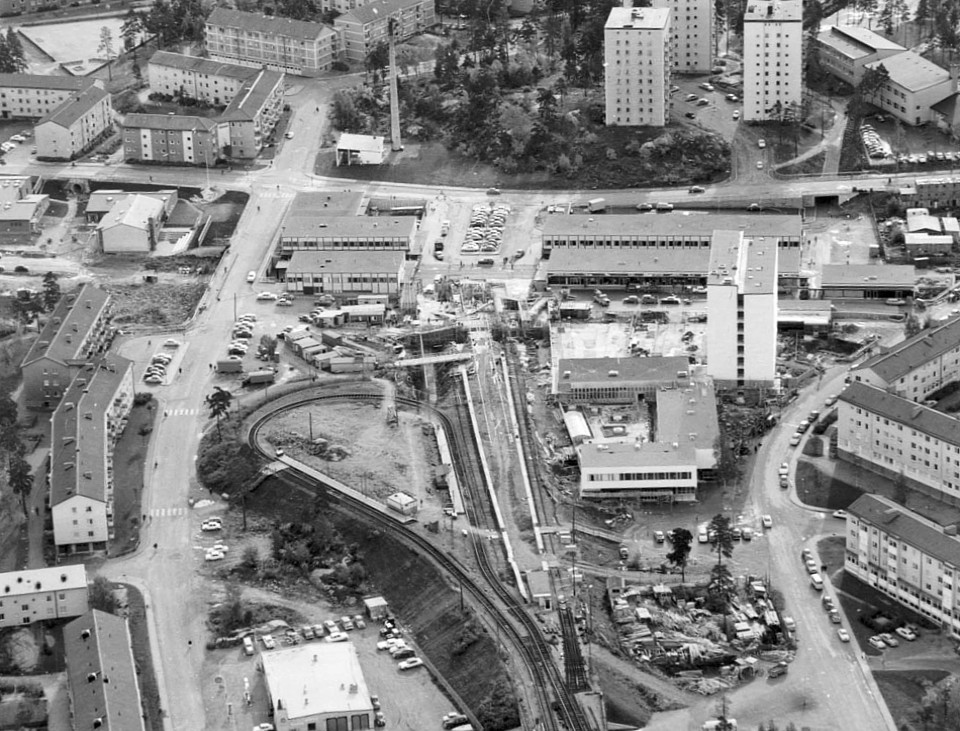
Aerial view of station during transition from tram to metro c.1960
