= Deaths in August 1991 =

The following is a list of notable deaths in August 1991.

Entries for each day are listed alphabetically by surname. A typical entry lists information in the following sequence:

- Name, age, country of citizenship at birth, subsequent country of citizenship (if applicable), reason for notability, cause of death (if known), and reference.

== August 1991 ==
=== 1 ===
- Helen Page Camp, 60, American actress (The Fresh Prince of Bel-Air), stroke.
- Carmine Fatico, 81, American mobster and caporegime in the Gambino crime family.
- John Gilchrist, 51, Scottish football player.
- Yusuf Idris, 64, Egyptian playwright and novelist, heart attack.
- Chris Short, 53, American baseball player (Philadelphia Phillies, Milwaukee Brewers), complications from a brain aneurysm.
- Vlado Šegrt, 83, Yugoslav and Bosnian partisan, politician and political commissar.

=== 2 ===
- Marcel Blistène, 80, French film director.
- Gianni Patrignani, 85, Italian Olympic swimmer (1924).
- Bob Perina, 70, American gridiron football player.
- Jack Sensenbrenner, 88, American politician.
- Boris Ugarov, 69, Soviet painter.
- John Francis Whealon, 70, American Roman Catholic archbishop.

=== 3 ===
- Georg Krog, 76, Norwegian Olympic speed skater (1936), and lawyer.
- Louise Hammond Raymond, 104, American tennis player.
- Armando Contreras Reyes, 72, Chilean football player.
- Cornelius V. S. Roosevelt, 75, American World War II veteran and grandson of president Theodore Roosevelt.
- Ali Sabri, 70, Egyptian politician, prime minister (1961–1968) and vice-president (1965–1968), heart attack.
- Károly Sós, 82, Hungarian football player and manager.
- Jim Steigenberger, 79, Australian rules footballer.

=== 4 ===
- Dean Burch, 63, American lawyer and lobbyist, bladder cancer.
- Don DaGradi, 80, American animator (Peter Pan) and screenwriter (Mary Poppins, Lady and the Tramp).
- Yevgeny Dragunov, 71, Soviet weapon designer (SVD-63 rifle).
- Jeri Southern, 64, American singer, heart attack.
- Emil Tschakarow, 43, Bulgarian conductor.
- Nikiforos Vrettakos, 79, Greek writer.
- Sammy White, 64, American baseball player (Boston Red Sox, Milwaukee Braves, Philadelphia Phillies).

=== 5 ===
- Frank Bateman, 67, Australian rules footballer.
- Paul Brown, 82, American football coach (Cleveland Browns, Cincinnati Bengals), pneumonia.
- Murray Golden, 78, American television director and producer (Death Valley Days, The Twilight Zone, Medical Center).
- Sōichirō Honda, 84, Japanese engineer and businessman (Honda), liver failure.
- Gaston Litaize, 81, French organist and composer.
- Lena Mukhina, 66, Russian diarist during the Siege of Leningrad.
- Andrei Sibiryakov, 27, Soviet serial killer.

=== 6 ===
- Shapour Bakhtiar, 77, Iranian politician, prime minister (1979), murdered.
- Jørgen Robert Hansen, 80, Danish Olympic field hockey player (1936, 1948).
- Roland Michener, 91, Canadian politician, governor general (1967–1974).
- Arthur Pentelow, 67, English actor (Emmerdale, Coronation Street, Privilege), heart attack.
- Harry Reasoner, 68, American journalist and commentator (60 Minutes), brain aneurysm.
- Max Rostal, 86, Austrian-British violinist.
- Joe Verdeur, 65, American competition swimmer, Olympic champion (1948), and world record-holder.
- Bill Volok, 81, American football player (Chicago Cardinals).

=== 7 ===
- Jimmy Cooney, 96, American baseball player.
- Kalina Jędrusik, 61, Polish singer and actress, asthma.
- Charles Manring, 61, American Olympic rower (1952).
- William James Te Wehi Taitoko, 43, New Zealand comedian, heart failure.
- Bai Xiangguo, 73, Chinese military officer and politician.

=== 8 ===
- Walt Atanas, 67, Canadian ice hockey player (New York Rangers).
- András Benkei, 67, Hungarian politician.
- Julissa Gomez, 18, American gymnast and quadriplegic, infection.
- Daniel Haberman, 58, American poet, translator and graphic designer, lymphoma.
- Gladys Hulette, 95, American silent film actress.
- James Irwin, 61, American astronaut (Apollo 15), heart attack.
- Matt Kelsh, 86, American football player (Brooklyn Dodgers).
- Eamonn Kinsella, 58, Irish Olympic hurdler (1956).
- Ivan Kozhedub, 71, Soviet flying ace during World War II, heart attack.
- Nicholas Poppe, 93, Russian-American linguist.
- Mitsuko Yoshikawa, 90, Japanese actress, heart attack.
- Walter Zeman, 64, Austrian football goalkeeper.

=== 9 ===
- Richard Lee Armstrong, 54, American-Canadian scientist, liver cancer.
- Cella Delavrancea, 103, Romanian pianist.
- Schubert Gambetta, 71, Uruguayan football player.
- Corrie Hartong, 85, Dutch choreographer.
- Rafael Lledó, 69, Argentine Olympic basketball player (1948, 1952).
- Richard Löwenthal, 83, German journalist and academic.
- Hank Majeski, 74, American baseball player and coach, cancer.

=== 10 ===
- John Abt, 87, American lawyer and communist politician
- Herbert Blankenhorn, 86, German diplomat.
- Anthony A. Bliss, 78, executive director and general manager of the Metropolitan Opera
- Ellen Braumüller, 80, German Olympic track and field athlete (1932).
- Danny Casolaro, 44, American writer, suicide by exsanguination.
- Hans Jakob Polotsky, 85, Israeli linguist.
- Jessie Robins, 86, English actress.
- Buster Smith, 86, American saxophonist, heart attack.

=== 11 ===
- Valér Barač, 82, Slovak Olympic discus thrower (1936).
- Julio Berrocal, 94, Peruvian artist.
- Jack Davis, 83, Australian rules footballer.
- Alfred Dompert, 76, German Olympic runner (1936).
- J. D. McDuffie, 52, American racing driver, racing accident.
- Alan Spenner, 43, English bass player, heart attack.
- Wilhelm Utermann, 78, German film producer.
- Tieleman Vuurman, 92, Dutch Olympic sports shooter (1936).
- Helmut Walcha, 83, German organist.

=== 12 ===
- Edward George Bowen, 80, Welsh physicist and inventor of radar.
- Chuck Chuckovits, 79, American basketball player.
- Lin Fengmian, 90, Chinese painter.
- William D. Gordon, 73, American screenwriter and actor, lung cancer.
- Édson Campos Martins, 61, Brazilian Olympic football player (1952).
- Archie Milano, 73, American football player (Detroit Lions) and coach.
- Bill Starr, 80, American baseball player (Washington Senators).
- Hans Weigel, 83, Austrian writer and theater critic.

=== 13 ===
- Lucia Peka, 79, Latvian-American artist.
- James Roosevelt, 83, American politician, member of the U.S. House of Representatives (1955–1965), stroke.
- Jack Ryan, 64, American toy designer (Barbie, Hot Wheels), suicide by gunshot.
- Richard A. Snelling, 64, American businessman and politician, heart attack.
- John Sommerfield, 83, British writer and left-wing activist.
- Kazuo Yamada, 78, Japanese conductor and composer.

=== 14 ===
- Waldemar Christoffer Brøgger, 79, Norwegian novelist, journalist, and translator.
- Stanley Chambers, 80, British cyclist and Olympic silver medalist (1932).
- Alberto Crespo, 71, Argentine racing driver.
- Charlie Davey, 83, Australian rules footballer.
- Taslim Olawale Elias, 76, Nigerian jurist.
- Douglas Kiker, 61, American author, heart attack.
- Ludwig Landgrebe, 89, Austrian phenomenologist and professor of philosophy.

=== 15 ===
- Eduardo Herrera Bueno, 77, Spanish football player.
- George Edwards, 64, Australian rules footballer.
- Ken Gunn, 82, Scottish football player.
- Ali Abu Nuwar, 67, Jordanian Army officer.
- Marietta Peabody Tree, 74, American political reporter, breast cancer.
- Jack Twyford, 82, Australian football player.

=== 16 ===
- Charles Garry, 82, American civil rights lawyer, stroke.
- C. Achutha Menon, 78, Indian politician, heart attack.
- Bruno Nicolai, 65, Italian film music composer and orchestra director.
- Johannes Wiese, 76, German Luftwaffe fighter ace during World War II.
- Luigi Zampa, 86, Italian film director.

=== 17 ===
- Don Dubbins, 63, American actor, cancer.
- Lorna Hill, 89, English children's author.
- Dieter König, 60, German motorboat racer.
- Mervyn Nelson, 76, American actor and producer.
- Marguerite Williams, 95, American geologist.

=== 18 ===
- Luís Lindley Cintra, 66, Portuguese philologist and linguist.
- David Gale, 54, British actor, complications from surgery.
- Rick Griffin, 47, American artist and cartoonist, traffic collision.
- Patrick Joseph Kelly, 96, Scottish-Nigerian Roman Catholic prelate.
- Porter Lainhart, 83, American football player (Philadelphia Eagles).
- Les McDowall, 78, Scottish football player.
- Chiang Sheng, 40, Taiwanese martial arts actor, heart attack.
- Vaughn Shoemaker, 89, American cartoonist, cancer.

=== 19 ===
- Oliver Drake, 88, American filmmaker.
- Xan Fielding, 72, British author, journalist and traveller.
- Hans van der Laan, 86, Dutch architect and monk.
- Richard Maltby, 77, American musician.
- Henri van Schaik, 92, Dutch horse rider and Olympic medalist (1936).
- John Sherf, 78, American ice hockey player (Detroit Red Wings).

=== 20 ===
- Herbert Ferber, 85, American visual artist.
- Kalman Kahana, 81, Israeli politician and journalist.
- Gopinath Mohanty, 77, Indian writer and novelist.
- Keith Parris, 86, Australian rules footballer.
- José Luis Sagi-Vela, 46, Olympic basketball player (1968).
- Harley Orrin Staggers, 84, American politician, member of the United States House of Representatives (1949-1981).
- Mihály Teleki, 95, Hungarian politician.

=== 21 ===
- Mikhail Agursky, 58, Russian sovietologist, cybernetic, dissident, and historian.
- Nick DeCarbo, 81, American gridiron football player (Pittsburgh Pirates.
- Wolfgang Hildesheimer, 74, German author.
- Eugen Jebeleanu, 80, Romanian poet, journalist and scholar.
- Paul Miller, 84, American journalist and newspaper executive, pneumonia.
- Rajaram Shastri, 87, Indian educationist.
- Oswald von Nell-Breuning, 101, German theologian.
- Richard Wilson, 75, American film director, pancreatic cancer.

=== 22 ===
- Jim Adamson, 86, Australian rules footballer.
- Chan Coulter, 89, American Olympic track and field athlete (1924).
- Colleen Dewhurst, 67, Canadian-American actress, cervical cancer.
- Gottfried E. Noether, 76, German-American mathematician.
- Boris Pugo, 54, Soviet politician, suicide by gunshot.
- Francis C. Whelan, 83, American district judge.

=== 23 ===
- George Dixon, 90, American Olympic rugby union player (1924).
- Harlan Hobart Grooms, 90, American district judge (United States District Court for the Northern District of Alabama).
- Wilhelm Hahnemann, 77, Austrian-German football player and Olympian (1948).
- Innes Lloyd, 65, Welsh television producer.
- Ágnes Nemes Nagy, 69, Hungarian poet, writer, and educator.
- Florence Barbara Seibert, 93, American biochemist.
- Mildred Trotter, 92, American forensic anthropology pioneer.

=== 24 ===
- Sergey Akhromeyev, 68, Soviet M\marshal, suicide by gunshot.
- Dick Beddoes, 65, Canadian sports journalist, liver cancer.
- Bernard Castro, 87, Italian-born American inventor.
- Reynold Brown, 73, American realist artist.
- Bob Friedlund, 51, American football player (Philadelphia Eagles), and coach.
- Abel Kiviat, 99, American Olympic runner (1912), prostate cancer.
- Tony Martínez, 51, Cuban-American baseball player (Cleveland Indians).
- Åge Ramberg, 69, Norwegian politician.
- Vivian Vachon, 40, Canadian professional wrestler and singer, traffic collision.
- Beb Vuyk, 86, Dutch writer.

=== 25 ===
- Stan Brett, 78, Australian rules footballer.
- Niven Busch, 88, American novelist and screenwriter (The Postman Always Rings Twice), congestive heart failure.
- Kunnenkeril K. Jacob, 87, Indian educationist.
- Shigeyoshi Matsumae, 89, Japanese engineer.
- Eddie Phillipson, 80, English cricket player.
- Yoshiko Shibaki, 77, Japanese writer of short stories and novels.

=== 26 ===
- Nikolay Kruchina, 63, Soviet communist official, suicide.
- Ron Livingstone, 65, American basketball player (Philadelphia Warriors).
- Georg Mattli, 36, Swiss ice hockey player and Olympian (1976).
- John Petts, 77, British artist.
- Vera Stroyeva, 87, Soviet film director and screenwriter.
- Willie Thornton, 71, Scottish football player.

=== 27 ===
- Pierre Bousquet, 71, French journalist and far-right politician.
- Gordon Heath, 72, American actor (The Emperor Jones, Animal Farm).
- Martín Karadagian, 69, Argentine professional wrestler and actor, diabetes.
- Toto Koopman, 82, Dutch model and spy.
- Gioacchino Muccin, 91, Italian Roman Catholic prelate.
- Mike Naumenko, 36, Soviet singer, cerebral hemorrhage.
- Patriarch German of Serbia, 92, Serbian Orthodox patriarch (1958–1990).
- Teddy Stauffer, 82, Swiss bandleader, entertainer, and restaurateur.
- Piet van Boxtel, 88, Dutch Olympic football player (1928).

=== 28 ===
- Umberto Brizzi, 83, Italian Olympic weightlifter (1936).
- Pierre Guillaumat, 82, French politician.
- Charlie Newman, 70, Australian rules footballer.
- Emiliano Piedra, 60, Spanish film producer, cancer.
- Alekos Sakellarios, 77, Greek writer and a director.
- Nicholas Schaffner, 38, American author, journalist, and singer-songwriter, AIDS-related complications.
- Vince Taylor, 52, English rock and roll singer ("Brand New Cadillac"), lung cancer.

=== 29 ===
- Dallas Adams, 44, English actor, AIDS.
- Ivan Bodin, 68, Swedish football player.
- Alick Buchanan-Smith, 59, Scottish politician.
- Dixie Dunbar, 72, American actress and singer.
- Libero Grassi, 67, Italian clothing manufacturer, murdered.

=== 30 ===
- Joyce Ackroyd, 72, Australian academic.
- Adão Nunes Dornelles, 68, Brazilian football player.
- Kevin Hurley, 77, Australian rules footballer.
- Cyril Knowles, 47, English footballer, brain cancer.
- Jean Tinguely, 66, Swiss sculptor, heart failure.
- Alan Wheatley, 84, English actor, heart attack.
- Danny Wheelahan, 88, Australian football player.

=== 31 ===
- Ed Buchanan, 57, Canadian football player, ALS.
- Andrzej Gąsienica Daniel, 59, Polish Olympic ski jumper (1956).
- Gerry Davis, 61, British television writer (Doctor Who).
- Cliff Lumsdon, 60, Canadian world champion marathon swimmer.
- Siti Sukaptinah Sunaryo Mangunpuspito, 83, Indonesian women's rights activist and politician.
- Phoolchandra Shastri, 90, Indian jain scholar, writer, and social reformer.
