= Hägersten-Liljeholmen =

- Borough of Stockholm
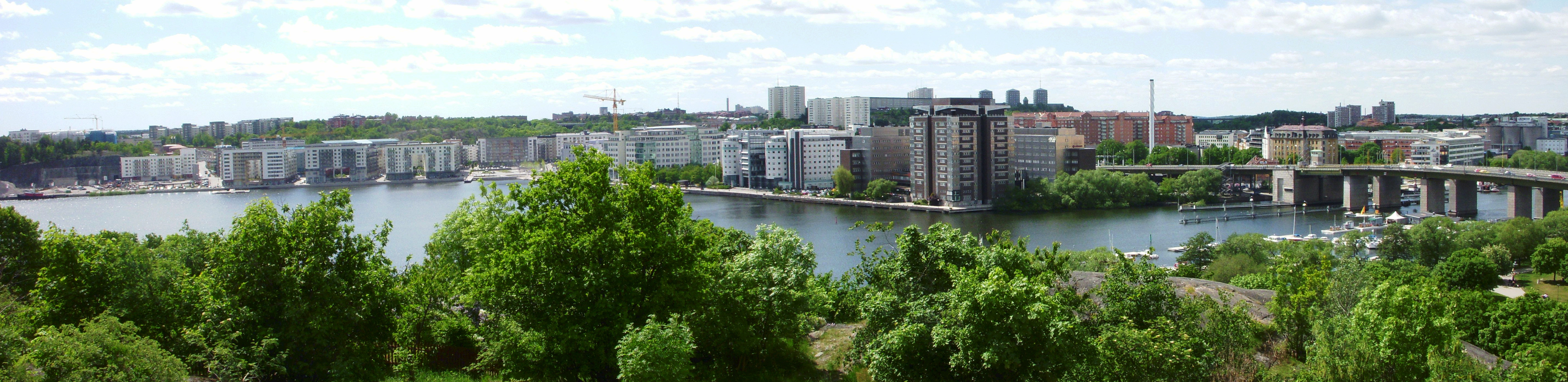
- Panoramic view of Liljeholmen

- Location of Hägersten-Liljeholmen within Stockholm Municipality shown in yellow
- Coordinates: 59°18′07″N 17°59′16″E
- Country: Sweden
- Municipality: Stockholm Municipality
- Municipality subdivision: Söderort
- Established: 2007

Government
  - Type: Municipal assembly
  - Municipal commissioner: Abit Dundar (FP)
- Population (2014): 83,283
- Time zone: UTC+1 (CET)
  - Summer (DST): UTC+2 (CEST)
- Postal code: 117 --, 126 --, 129 --
- Area code: 08
- Website: Stockholm.se

Hägersten-Liljeholmen is a borough (stadsdelsområde) in Stockholm, Sweden. It is part of the Söderort suburban area.

The borough is located in South Stockholm. The districts that make up the borough are Aspudden, Fruängen, Gröndal, Hägersten, Hägerstensåsen, Liljeholmen, Midsommarkransen, Mälarhöjden, Västberga, and Västertorp. The population of Hägersten-Liljeholmen borough is 83,283 as of 2014.

The borough was formed on January 1, 2007 by merging the Hägersten borough (Hägersten, Fruängen, Hägerstensåsen, Mälarhöjden and Västertorp) with Liljeholmen borough (Aspudden, Gröndal, Midsommarkransen, Västberga and a portion of Hägersten).

== Demographic history ==
- The population of the Liljeholmen borough in 2004 was 30,450 on an area of 6.83 km^{2}, giving it a density of 4,458/km^{2}.
- The population of Hägersten-Liljeholmen borough is 83,283 as of 2014.

== Sports ==
The following sports clubs are located in Hägersten-Liljeholmen:

- IFK Aspudden-Tellus, based in Aspudden (IFK Tellus formerly based in Telefonplan)
- Hägersten SK, based in Hägerstensåsen
- Mälarhöjdens IK, based in Mälarhöjden
- Gröndals IK, based in Gröndal
- Kransen United FF, based in Midsommarkransen
- SK Rockaden, based in Hägerstensåsen

== People ==
- David Bielkheden, mixed martial artist, brought up in Hägersten
- John Martin Lindström, singer, brought up in Hägersten
- Stefano Catenacci, cook, brought up in Hägersten
- Lena Nilsson, actress, brought up in Fruängen
- Tomas Andersson Wij, musician, from Fruängen
- Aleks, singer, brought up in Fruängen
- Gunnel Fred, actress, from Fruängen
- Rolf Ridderwall, ice hockey goaltender, from Fruängen
- Fredde Granberg, actor, from Fruängen
- Ove Sundberg, from Fruängen
- Pontus Enhörning, from Fruängen
- Susanne Ljung, from Fruängen
- Lars Lundström, script writer, from Fruängen
- Salem Al Fakir, musician, lives in Fruängen
- Nanne Grönvall, singer, brought up in Västberga
- Melinda Wrede, journalist, brought up in Aspudden and Midsommarkransen
- Richard Wrede, rapper, brought up in Aspudden and Midsommarkransen
- Ison Glasgow, hip hop artist, brought up in Västertorp
- Jan-Ove Waldner, table tennis legend, has lived in Gulddragen near Västertorp
- Ara Abrahamian, wrestler, has lived in Västertorp
- Nabil Bahoui, footballer, brought up and lives in Gulddragen
- Jens Lapidus, author, brought up in Gröndal
- Lennart Askinger, footballer, brought up in Gröndal
- Roland Stoltz, ice hockey player, brought up in Gröndal
- Håkan Juholt, politician, lives in Västertorp
- Robyn, singer, lives in Liljeholmen
- Maria Lager, model, brought up in Hägersten
- Jonas Renkse, musician
- Quorthon, musician
- Sarah Sjöström, swimmer
- Gideon Ståhlberg, chess grandmaster
- Daniel Breitholtz, A&R manager
- Martin Lidberg, wrestler
- Christoffer Röstlund Jonsson, musician
- Rafael Edholm, actor
- Maria Antoniou, actress
- Lisa Ekdahl, singer-songwriter
- Annika Hallin, actress
- Sofia Ledarp, actress
- Abir Al-Sahlani, politician
- Camilla Kvartoft, journalist
- Cecilia Uddén, journalist
- Johan Wiklander, ice hockey player
