= Engqvist =

Engqvist is a Swedish surname. Notable people with the surname include:

- Andreas Engqvist (born 1987), Swedish ice hockey player
- Jonatan Habib Engqvist, Swedish art historian, art critic and curator
- Lars Engqvist (born 1945), Swedish politician
- Leif Engqvist (born 1962), Swedish footballer and manager
- Lisa Engqvist (1914–1989), Danish ceramist and graphic artist
- Mats Engqvist, Swedish football coach
- Thomas Engqvist (born 1963), Swedish chess player
