= Mälarhöjden =

Urban district in southwest Stockholm, Sweden

Coordinates: 59°18′04″N 17°57′26″E

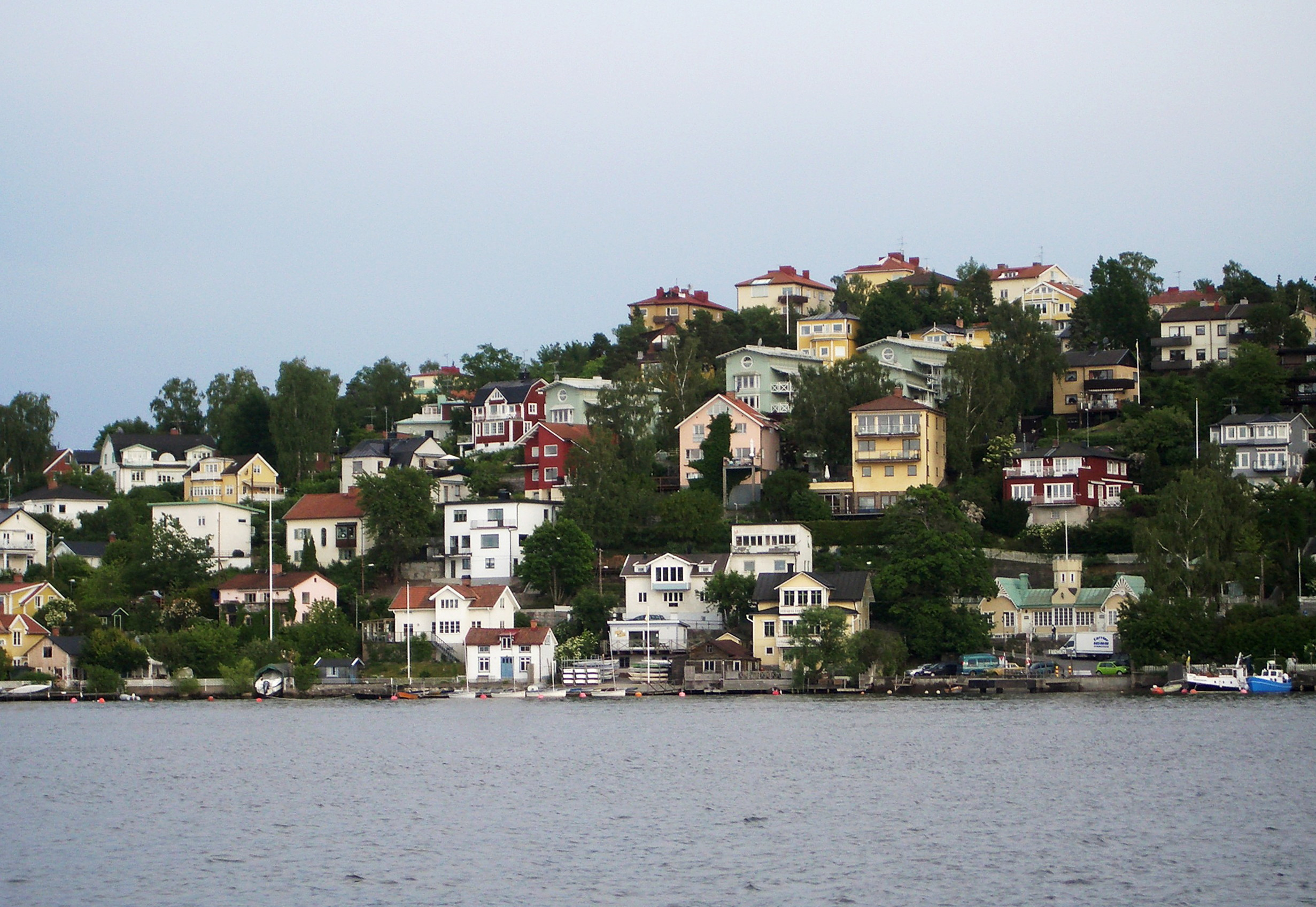
Mälarhöjden in June 2008.

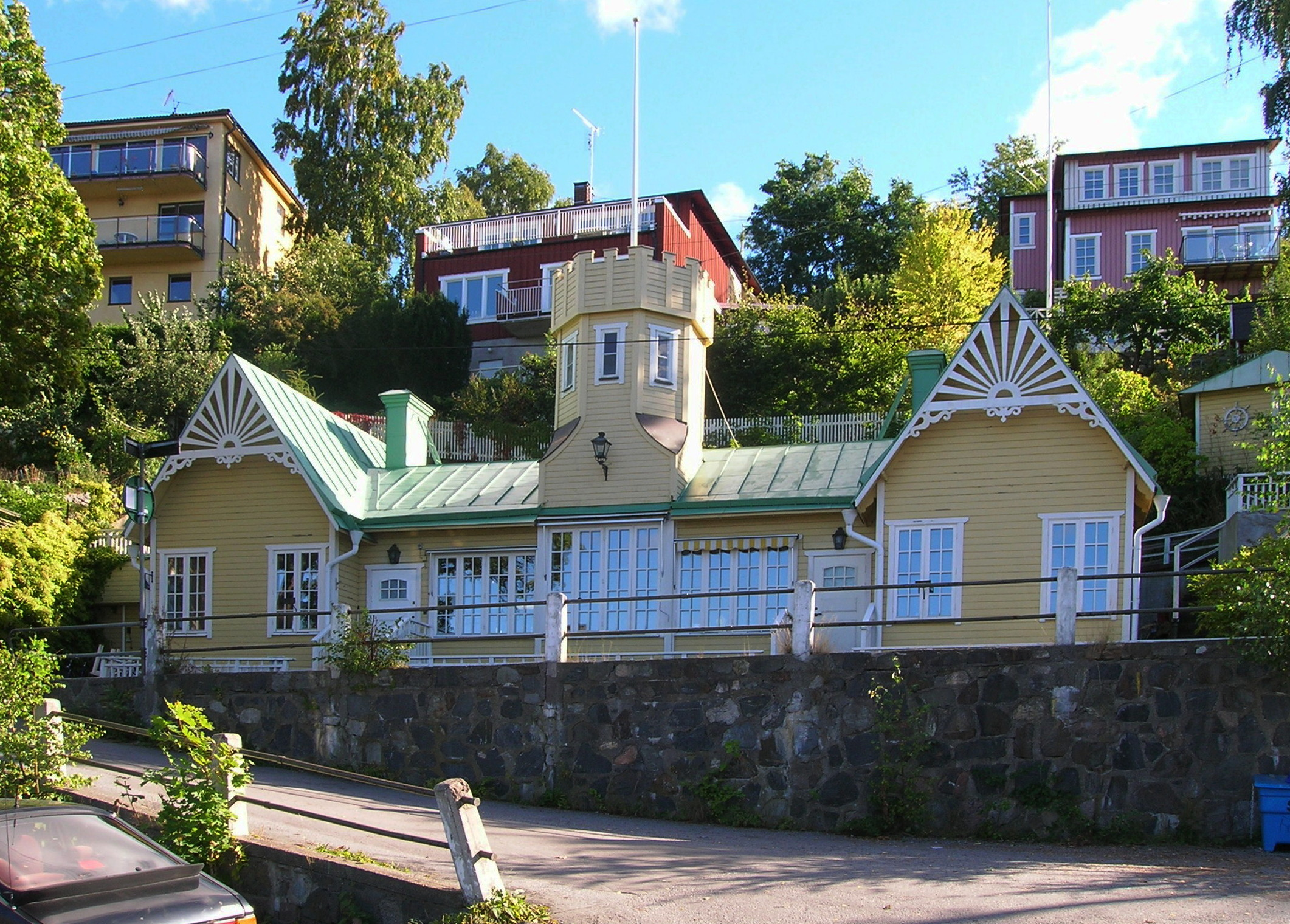
Bredablick, well known 19th century building in the area, here in September 2005.

Mälarhöjden (lit. 'Mälaren Heights') is a suburb in southwestern Stockholm, Sweden. It is a part of the Hägersten borough. The area is dominated by single-family houses. It borders Hägersten, Västertorp, Fruängen, and Bredäng. As of 2004, the area had 4022 inhabitants.

== Sources ==
- Bo G. Hall: Mälarhöjden med omnejd - Från Örnsberg till Vårberg, Monographies published by City of Stockholm, No 72, 1986, ISBN 91-38-09759-1
