= Alf Ahlberg =

Writer, humanist, philosopher

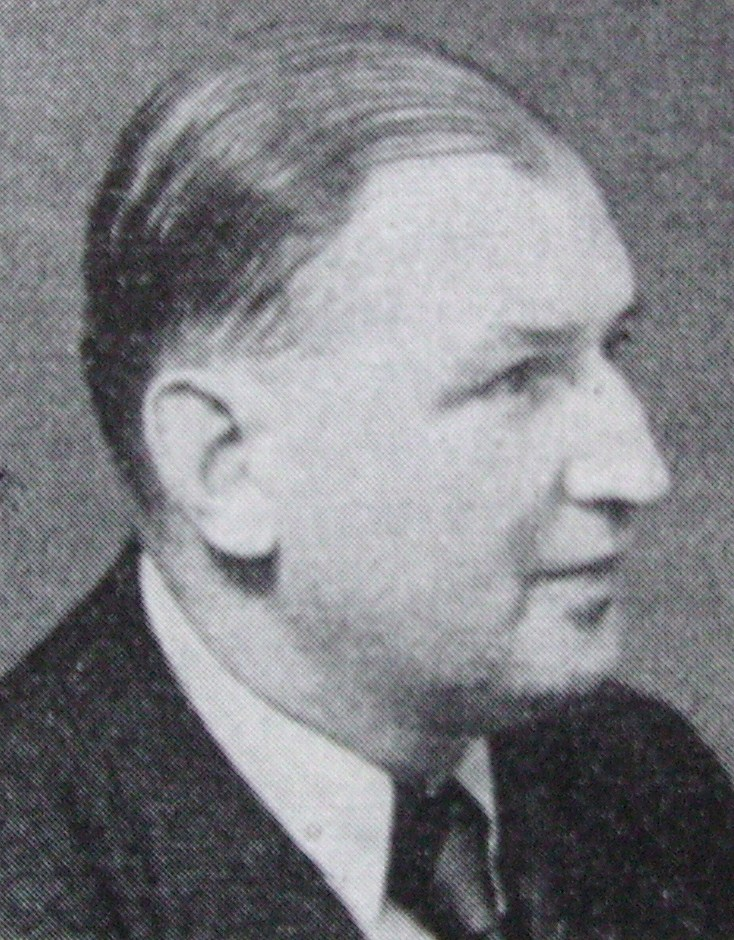
- Born: 21 October 1892; Laholm, Sweden
- Died: 29 January 1979 (aged 86)
- Relatives: Hakon Ahlberg (brother)

Academic background
- Education: Lund University (MBA, PhD)

Alf Ahlberg (21 October 1892 – 29 January 1979) was a Swedish academic, writer, humanist and philosopher.

== Early life and education ==
Ahlberg was born in 1892 in Laholm, Sweden, the son of Axel Ahlberg and Anna Lindskog, and the brother of the architect Hakon Ahlberg. He studied at Lund University and came to know in particular Sigfrid Lindstrom and Gunnar Aspelin. In the summer, he stayed in Lund to read Schopenhauer in the botanical garden of Lund at the foot of Aagardhs statue. He earned a Master of Business Administration in 1911 and his PhD in 1917 with the thesis, "Material problems of Platonism: Plato, Aristotle, Plotinus, Bruno: a historical-critical study."

== Career ==
Ahlberg was a senior teacher at a college in Stockholm and was a lecturer at the Arbetarinstitutet. In 1927, he became a teacher at the workers educational institute, Brunnsvik, and in 1932 he became the headmaster, which he remained until his retirement in 1959. For several years he wrote frequently in the newspaper Dagens Nyheter. In 1933, he married Edith Larsson, who died in 1944. 1946 he remarried with MA Rut Davidsson.

Ahlberg was mainly known for his scientific works on philosophy. One of the most noted works, "The social and political myths" (1937), is about Nazi propaganda and mythology. In "Escape from loneliness" (1949) he investigated why the contemporary citizen is so susceptible to propaganda. His main work of the "History of philosophy" was excellent as it was the first of its kind and sold in several editions (the last and fifth revised edition was published in 1967). In 1935 it was followed up by History of Psychology. He also wrote several biographies on, for example, Augustine, John Malmberg, Nietzsche and Schopenhauer, and made translations of José Ortega y Gasset.
