= Wiklander =

Wiklander is a Swedish surname. Notable people with this surname include:

- Ann-Cathrine Wiklander (born 1958), Swedish singer
- David Boo Wiklander (born 1984), Swedish football player
- Iwar Wiklander (born 1939), Swedish actor
- Johan Wiklander (born 1981), Swedish ice hockey player
- Lars-Göran Wiklander (born 1970), Swedish ice hockey player
- Raymond Wiklander, Swedish figure skater
