= John Ingvar Lövgren =

Swedish serial killer and rapist

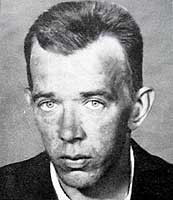
- Lövgren in an undated photo
- Born: 22 October 1930; Norrköping, Sweden
- Died: 9 February 2002 (aged 71); Stockholm, Sweden
- Other names: "Flickmördaren"; John Ingvar Andersson
- Conviction: Murder
- Penalty: Closed psychiatric treatment

Details
- Victims: 4
- Span of crimes: 1958–1963
- Country: Sweden
- State: Stockholm
- Date apprehended: 1963

John Ingvar Lövgren (22 October 1930 – 9 February 2002), later renamed John Ingvar Andersson, was a Swedish serial killer and rapist who confessed to four murders committed between 1958 and 1963 in the Stockholm region. Lövgren was convicted and sentenced to closed psychiatric treatment at Salberga prison. He went under the name Flickmördaren (lit. 'The Girl Killer'), because his last two victims were young girls. He was, at the time of his death in 2002, no longer in treatment due to poor health caused by terminal cancer. He was buried at Sala cemetery.

== Biography ==
Lövgren's parents died when he was young and he was subsequently placed in a foster home. As an adult, Lövgren became infamous for drinking heavily and exposing himself to women, for which he was convicted several times. Because of this, he was enrolled in several different psychiatric hospitals between 1953 and 1961. The authorities described him as childish and weak, probably with a mild intellectual disability. At the time of the murders, Lövgren held a job as a gardener.

After the murder of Ann-Kristin Svensson in September 1963, her playmates identified Lövgren as the perpetrator. In addition, while fleeing the crime scene, he left an obvious trail in the form of Svensson's clothes while making a desperate attempt to get rid of them, leading the authorities to Lövgren's residential area.

After he was arrested, Lövgren confessed to another murder: the unsolved murder of 26-year-old Agneta Nyholm in Fruängen in June 1958. Despite this, Lövgren was never convicted of her murder and her case has since been closed due to reaching its statute of limitation. Police, however, consider the crime essentially solved and Lövgren to be the assailant.

== Victims ==
- Agneta Nyholm, 26 – murdered on the night of 27 June 1958 at her home in Fruängen.
- Greta Löfgren, 62 – raped and murdered in November 1962 in her home on Kungsholmen.
- Berit Glesing, 6 – raped and murdered on 12 August 1963 in Vita Bergen on Södermalm.
- Ann-Kristin Svensson, 4 – raped and murdered on 2 September 1963 in Aspudden.

== Literature ==
- The novel The Man on the Balcony (1967) released by Sjöwall/Wahlöö was based on John Ingvar Lövgren and his crimes.
- The true face of the assassination: a criminal commissioner's memories (1971) by Gösta W. Larsson, published by Stockholm: Bonniers

== See also ==
- List of serial killers by country
