= Hägersten SK =

Swedish football club

- Full name: Hägersten Sportklubb
- Founded: 1933
- Ground: Hägerstensåsens BP; Hägersten; Sweden
- Chairman: Per Åfeldt
- League: Division 4 Stockholm Södra
Home colours

Hägersten SK was a Swedish football club located in Hägersten within the borough of Hägersten-Liljeholmen.In 2018, they merged with Mälarhöjdens IK to become Mälarhöjden-Hägersten FF.

== Background ==
Hägersten SK currently plays in Division 4 Stockholm Södra which is the sixth tier of Swedish football. They play their home matches at the Hägerstensåsens BP in Hägersten.

The club is affiliated to Stockholms Fotbollförbund.

== Season to season ==
Season	Level	Division	Section	Position	Movements
2006*	Tier 7	Division 5	Stockholm Södra	6th	
2007	Tier 7	Division 5	Stockholm Södra	5th	
2008	Tier 7	Division 5	Stockholm Södra	2nd	Promoted
2009	Tier 6	Division 4	Stockholm Södra	5th	
2010	Tier 6	Division 4	Stockholm Södra	7th	
2011	Tier 6	Division 4	Stockholm Södra		

* League restructuring in 2006 resulted in a new division being created at Tier 3 and subsequent divisions dropping a level.
