= Robert Åstedt =

Swedish footballer

Personal information
- Date of birth: 2 February 1996 (age 30)
- Place of birth: Sweden
- Height: 1.80 m (5 ft 11 in)
- Position: Centre-back

Team information
- Current team: AFC Eskilstuna (assistant); AFC Eskilstuna (youth coach)

Youth career
- Mälarhöjdens IK
- AFC United

Senior career*
Years	Team	Apps	(Gls)
2014–2020	AFC Eskilstuna	49	(1)
2021–2022	AFC Eskilstuna	3	(0)

Managerial career
- 2017–: AFC Eskilstuna (youth)
- 2021–: AFC Eskilstuna (assistant)
- * Club domestic league appearances and goals as of 26 July 2023

Robert Åstedt (born 2 February 1996) is a Swedish retired footballer and current assistant manager of AFC Eskilstuna.

== Career ==
=== Later career ===
In May 2021 AFC Eskilstuna confirmed, that 25-year old had retired and would continue as a part of the technical staff as an individual coach. Beside that, he would also continue in his position as a youth coach, which he had been since 2017, after AFC United changed their name to AFC Eskilstuna.

On 7 November 2021, Åstedt made his comeback on the pitch after most of the players in AFC Eskilstuna's squad suffered from stomach ailments. Åstedt came on the pitch from the bench in a 4-3 win against Falkenbergs FF.
