= SK Rockaden =

Swedish chess club

- Type: Competitive Chess Club
- Founded: 1921
- Location: Hägersten, Stockholm
- Country: Sweden
- Website: Official Website

SK Rockaden is the biggest chess club in Sweden, founded 1921 at Södermalm in central Stockholm, where the club spent most of its first forty years. In 1961 the club moved to the southern suburb Högdalen and in 1993 to its present location in the southwestern suburb Hägerstensåsen in the borough Hägersten-Liljeholmen. SK Rockaden currently has got more than 800 members.

Since the 1972/73 season SK Rockaden plays in the Swedish national premier league, Elitserien i schack, and have won Elitserien and its predecessor Lag-SM (National Team Championship) 27 times since its inception in 1951: 1957–1959, 1980, 1982, 1984–1986, 1992–1998, 2001, 2004, 2005, 2008, 2009, 2014, 2016, 2021, 2023, 2024 2025 and 2026.

SK Rockaden has represented Sweden 20 times in the European Club Cup, arranged by the European Chess Union: 1980/81, 1983/84, 1985/86, 1993, 1994, 1995, 1996, 1997, 1998, 2000, 2001, 2005, 2008, 2014, 2016, 2022, 2023 2024, 2025 and 2026. SK Rockaden reached the semifinal in 1986 and the quarter-final in 1993.

Since the 1980s SK Rockaden has been represented by, among others, Grandmasters Ulf Andersson, Lars Karlsson, Erik Blomqvist, Jaan Ehlvest, Vassily Ivanchuk, Eric Lobron, Peter Heine Nielsen, Viktorija Čmilytė, Jon Ludvig Hammer, Arturs Neiksans, Bartosz Socko, Johan Salomon and Jonas Buhl Bjerre as well as Internationell masters Jonas Barkhagen, Robert Bator, Roland Ekström, Thomas Engqvist, Christer Hartman, Erik Hedman, Emil Hermansson, Patrik Lyrberg, Anders Olsson, Seo Jung-min, Mats Sjöberg, Hampus Sörensen, Edvin Trost, Richard Wessman and Michael Wiedenkeller.

For example, when the club won the 2004 championship they included "Super GM" Vassily Ivanchuk, GM Peter Heine Nielsen, GM Eric Lobron, GM Ulf Andersson and GM Lars Karlsson. When they represented Sweden in the European Club Cup in 2005 their team consisted of one Grandmaster, five International Masters, and a FIDE Master.

Since the beginning of the 1980s SK Rockaden has been Sweden's leading club for junior players. The club has won the National Junior Team Championships Juniorallsvenskan (for players up to 20 years old) 17 times since its inception in 1987: 1990, 1992–1995, 1997–1998, 2005-2010, 2013, 2016, 2018 and 2022. The club has also won the National Cadet Team Championships Kadettallsvenskan (for players up to 16 years old) 20 times since its inception in 1987: 1987-1990, 1992, 1994–1998, 2000, 2003-2008, 2012-2013 and 2016.
