= Stefano Catenacci =

Swedish chef

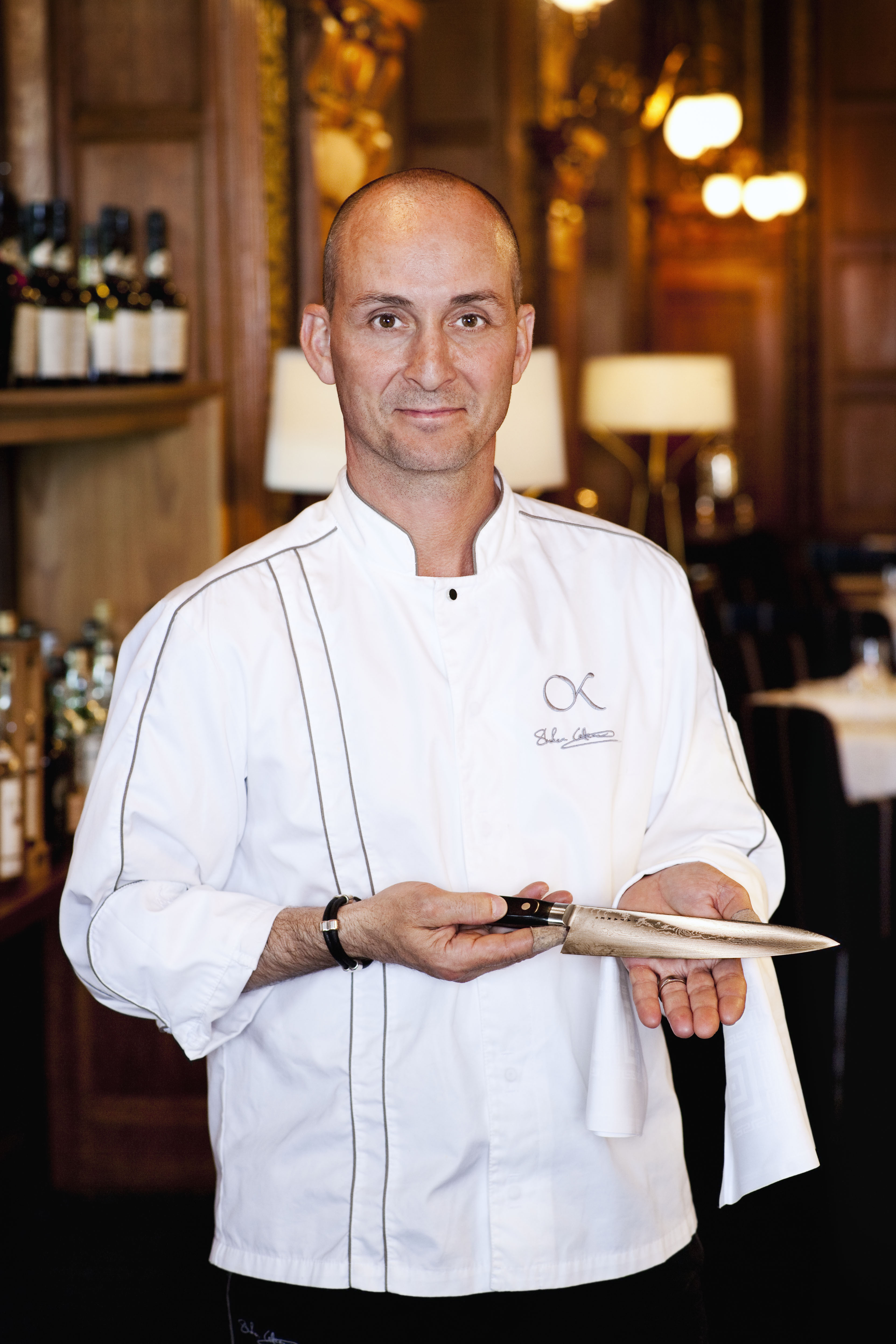
- Catenacci in 2013
- Born: Stefano Sam Enrico Catenacci; 8 March 1966 (age 60); Hägersten, Sweden
- Years active: 1996-present

Stefano Sam Enrico Catenacci (born 8 March 1966) is a Swedish chef. In 1996, Catenacci became head chef at Operakällaren in Stockholm, succeeding Werner Vögeli. Since 2001, he is co-owner of Nobis AB, the mother company of Operakällaren. During his management in 1998 to 2010, the restaurant had one star in the Michelin Guide. The restaurant lost its star in 2010, but regained it in 2014, after food critics from Visita and White Guide, sampled the restaurant.

Catenacci is responsible for banquettes, gala dinners served at the Stockholm Palace. He was responsible for the dinner at the wedding of Crown Princess Victoria and Prince Daniel in the summer of 2010. He was also in charge of the food at the wedding of Princess Madeleine and Christopher O'Neill in the summer of 2013.

In 2010, Catenacci released the book Operakällaren, Operahuset, Karl XII:s torg, Stockholm, a book about the history of the restaurant Operakällaren. In 2011, he released the cookbook Stefanos Italia : den stora italienska kokboken, a book about his best Italian dishes.

In 2012, he participated in the TV4 cooking competition show Kockarnas kamp, in which he was the runner-up.

In November 2015, Catenacci and his wife filed jointly for divorce.

On 8 November 2020, Catenacci quit his job at Operakällaren after accusations of mistreatment of staff was made against him.
