= Maria Antoniou =

Swedish actress (born 1964)

Maria Antoniou (born 8 December 1964 in Hägersten) is a Swedish actress.

== Filmography ==
- 1988 - Vargens tid
- 2002 - Bella bland kryddor och kriminella
- 2003–2007 - Tusenbröder
- 2006 - Tusenbröder – Återkomsten
- 2008 - Livet i Fagervik
