= Lennart Askinger =

Swedish footballer (1922–1995)

Personal information
- Full name: Carl Johan Lennart Askinger
- Date of birth: 22 May 1922
- Place of birth: Gröndal, Sweden
- Date of death: 13 April 1995 (aged 72)
- Position(s): Defender

Senior career*
| Years | Team | Apps | (Gls) |
| 1936–1941 | Gröndals IK | | |
| 1941–1945 | Reymersholms IK | | |
| 1946–1955 | AIK Fotboll | 107 | (5) |
- *Club domestic league appearances and goals

Carl Johan Lennart Askinger (22 May 1922 – 13 April 1995) was a Swedish football defender who played for AIK Fotboll in Allsvenskan for seven seasons. Besides football Askinger also represented AIK in bandy and ice hockey. He was married to Märta and had two children, Jan and Jörgen. His wife Märta was a cousin of the wife of Ivan Bodin.
