= Hakon Ahlberg =

Swedish architect, author, and editor (1891–1984)

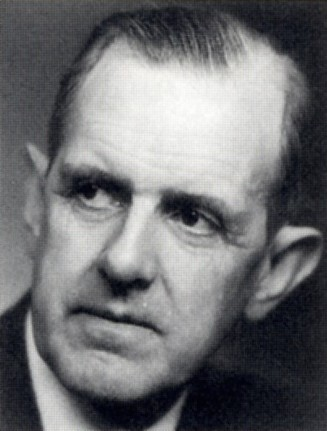
- Ahlberg in 1940
- Born: Hakon Claes Axel Ahlberg; 10 June 1891; Laholm, Sweden
- Died: 12 March 1984 (aged 92); Stockholm, Sweden
- Occupations: Architect; editor; author

Hakon Ahlberg (10 June 1891 – 12 March 1984) was a Swedish architect, author, and editor.

== Biography ==
Hakon Claes Axel Ahlberg was born at Laholm in Halland County, Sweden. He studied architecture at the Royal Institute of Technology in Stockholm, completing his studies in 1914. He also undertook studies at the Royal Swedish Academy of Arts in 1914–1917, one of his most influential teachers being Ivar Tengbom.

Ahlberg established his own office in 1917. He was best known as the official architect for the repair and restoration of Gripsholm Castle, near the town of Mariefred, in central Sweden. He was one of the founding members and first president of the Swedish Architects' Association and was known as an active participant in architectural debates. He was editor-in-chief of the Swedish architectural journals Arkitekten in 1922 and Byggmästaren, 1922–24. He was also president of the Swedish Academy of Fine Arts 1954–62.

Ahlberg's principal role in Swedish architecture was not as a "leader of style" but as an idealistic leader, as an organiser and spokesman of the Swedish architectural profession.

As an architect, he was part of the brief movement called Nordic Classicism, but with clear links with Swedish vernacular architecture, as expressed in the simple wooden houses he designed for the Swedish trade union-run folk high school Brunnsvik folkhögskola) in Ludvika parish, during 1928. He designed a number of churches (e.g., Mälarhöjden church, Stockholm, 1929), museums, and residences. His most important works are the Arts and Crafts pavilion of the Gothenburg exhibition in 1923 and the PUB department store in central Stockholm, from 1924. Ahlberg also designed several hospitals, including the Sidsjön mental hospital in Sundsvall 1939–44, the Children's clinic in Oslo, Norway (1946–50), and the University Hospital in Maracaibo, Venezuela (1946–54).

In 1957, Ahlberg was awarded the Prince Eugen Medal and in 1973 the Alvar Aalto Medal.

Ahlberg's architectural office closed in 1973. He died in Stockholm in 1984.

== Gallery ==
Selection of buildings designed or co-designed by Hakon Ahlberg

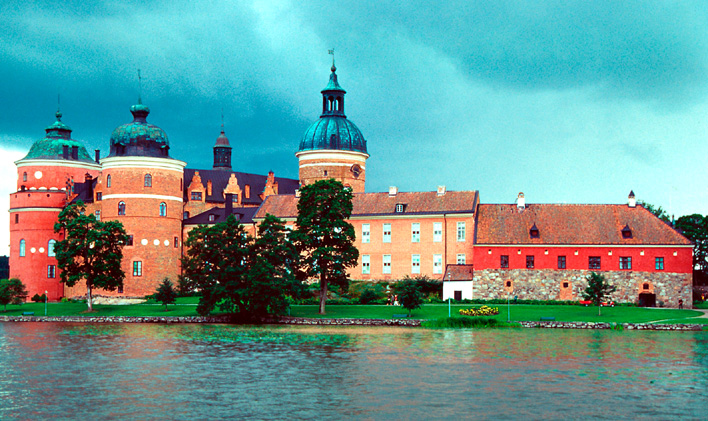
Gripsholm Castle, Mariefred

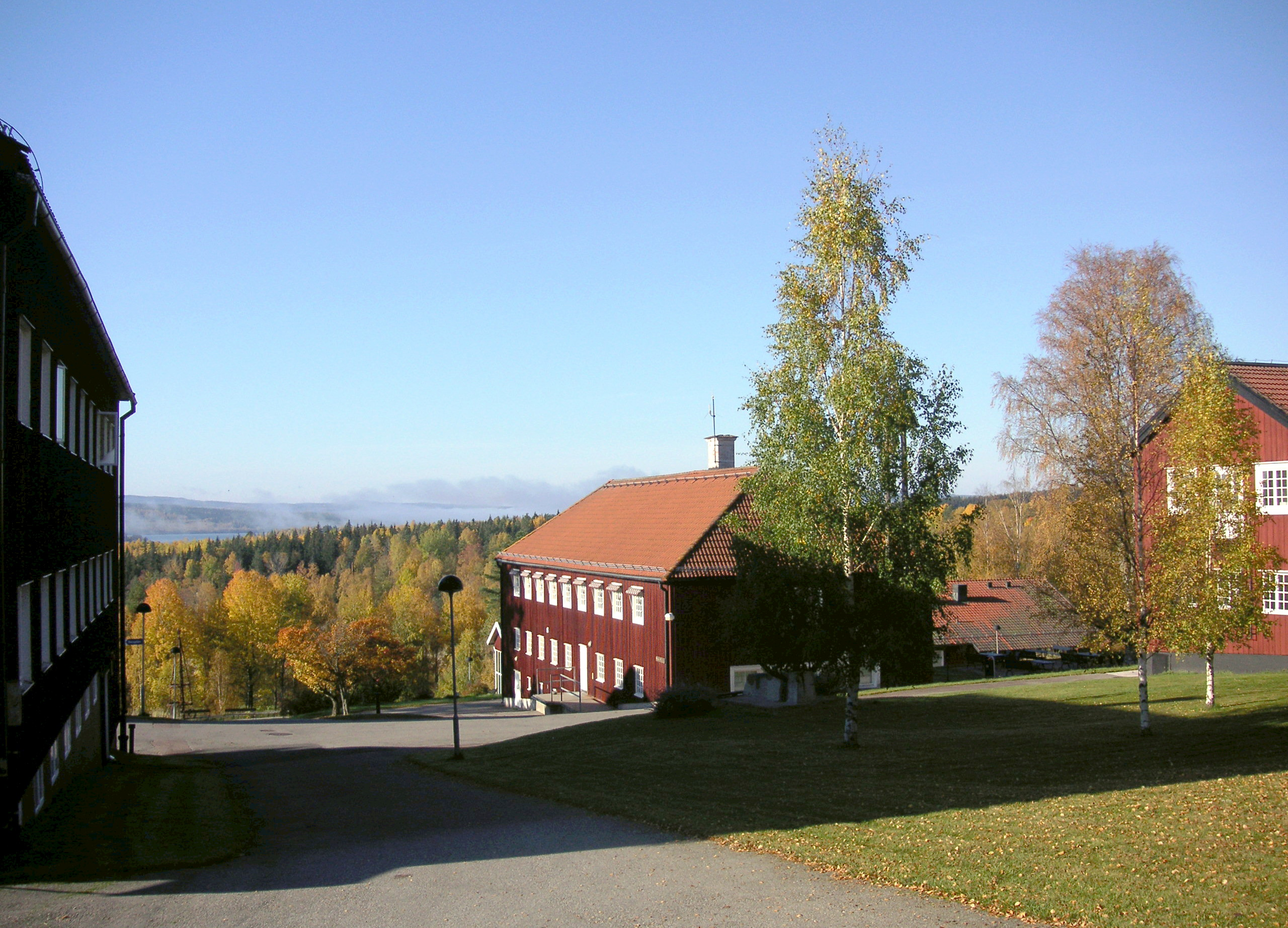
Former Brunnsvik folk high school, Ludvika Municipality

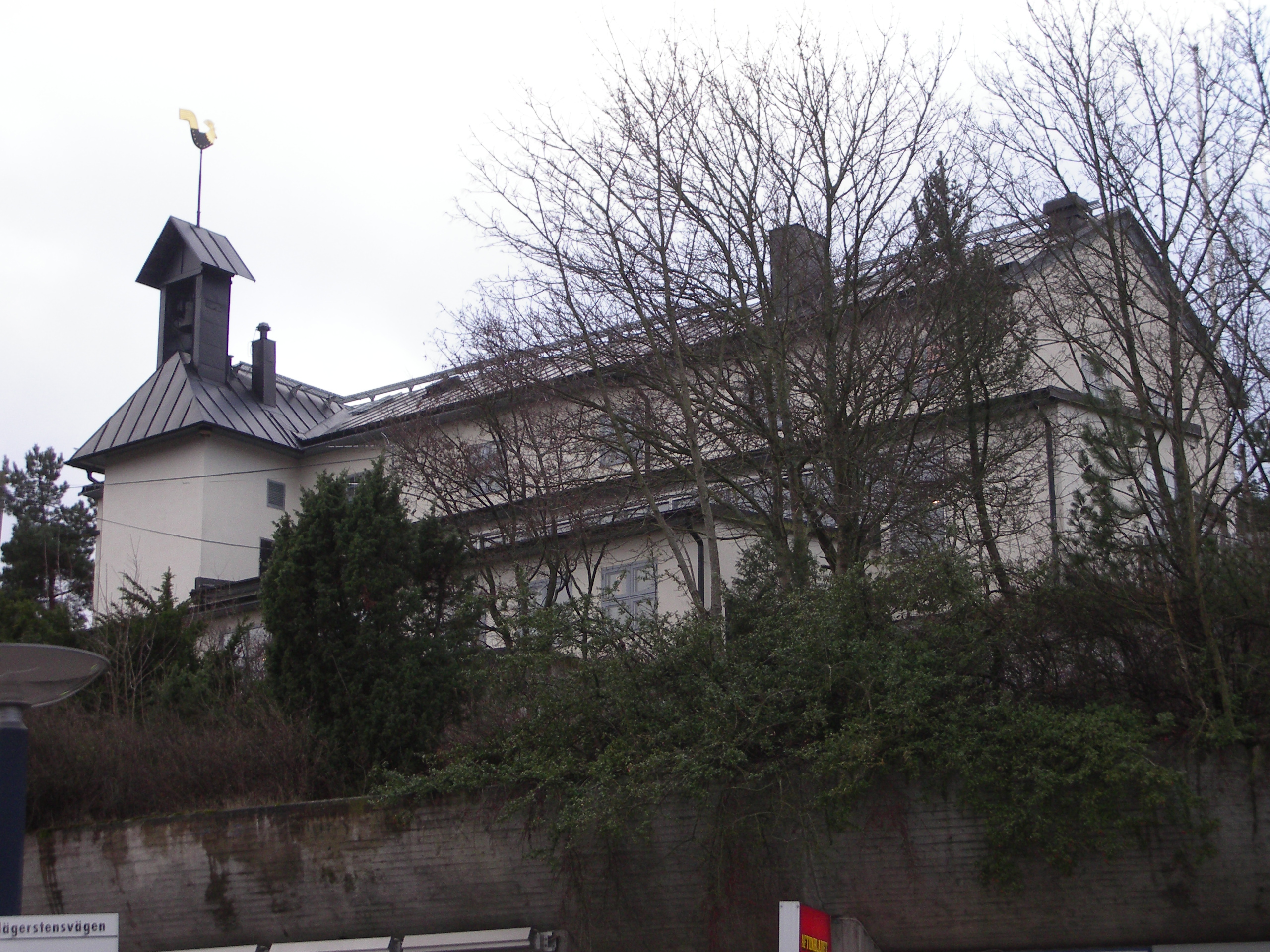
Mälarhöjden Church, Stockholm, 1929

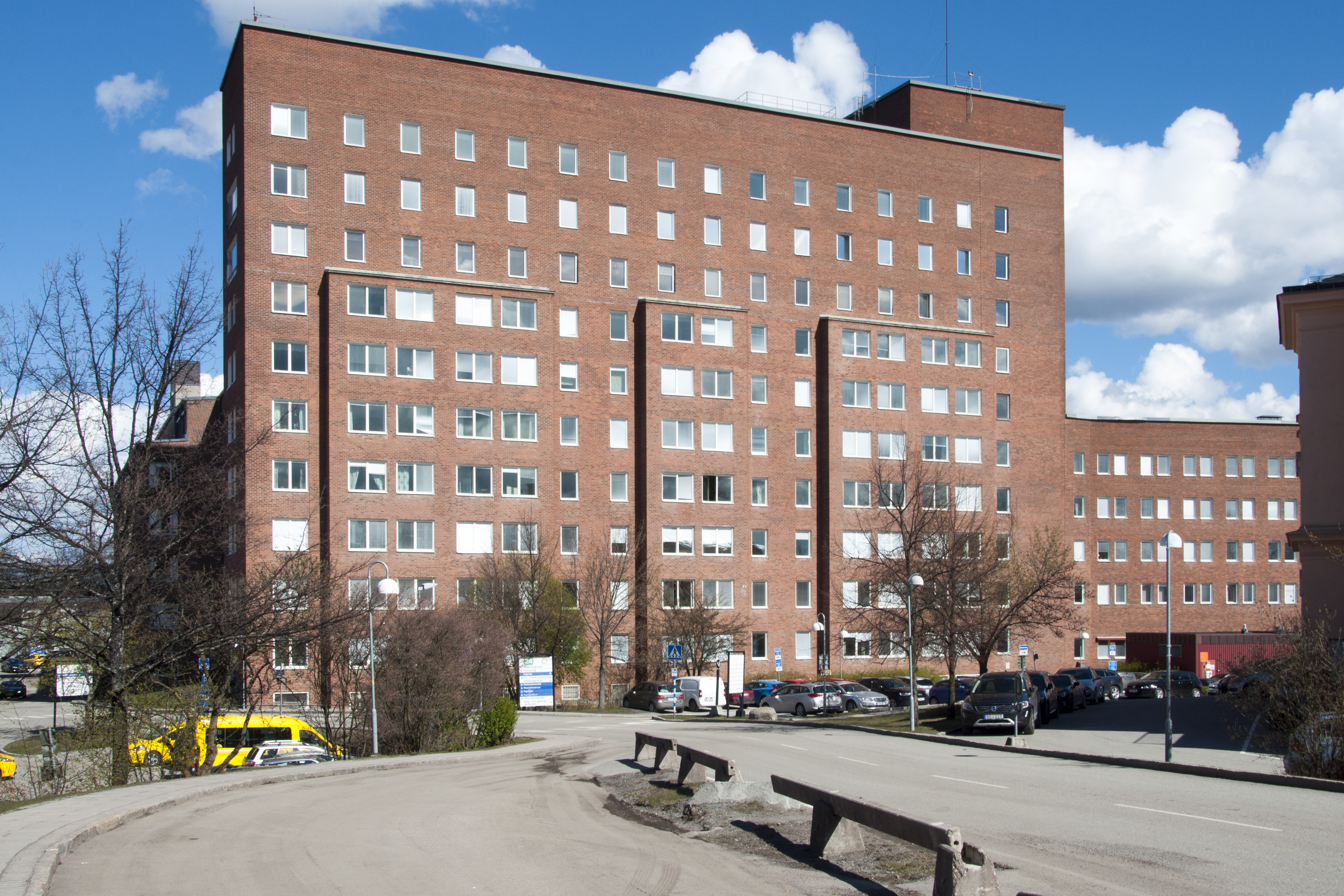
Karolinska Solna, Neurocentrum

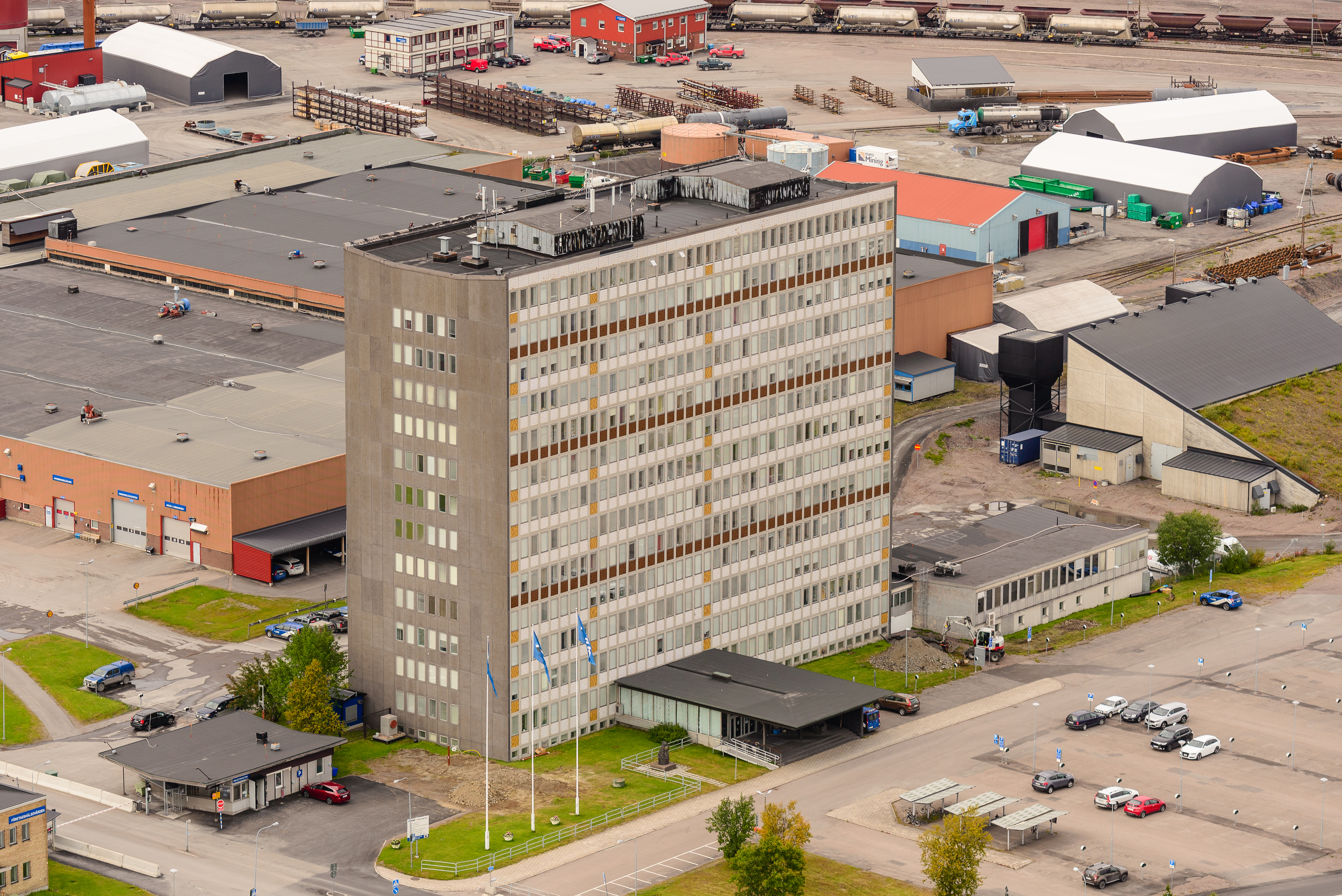
LKAB office building in Kiruna

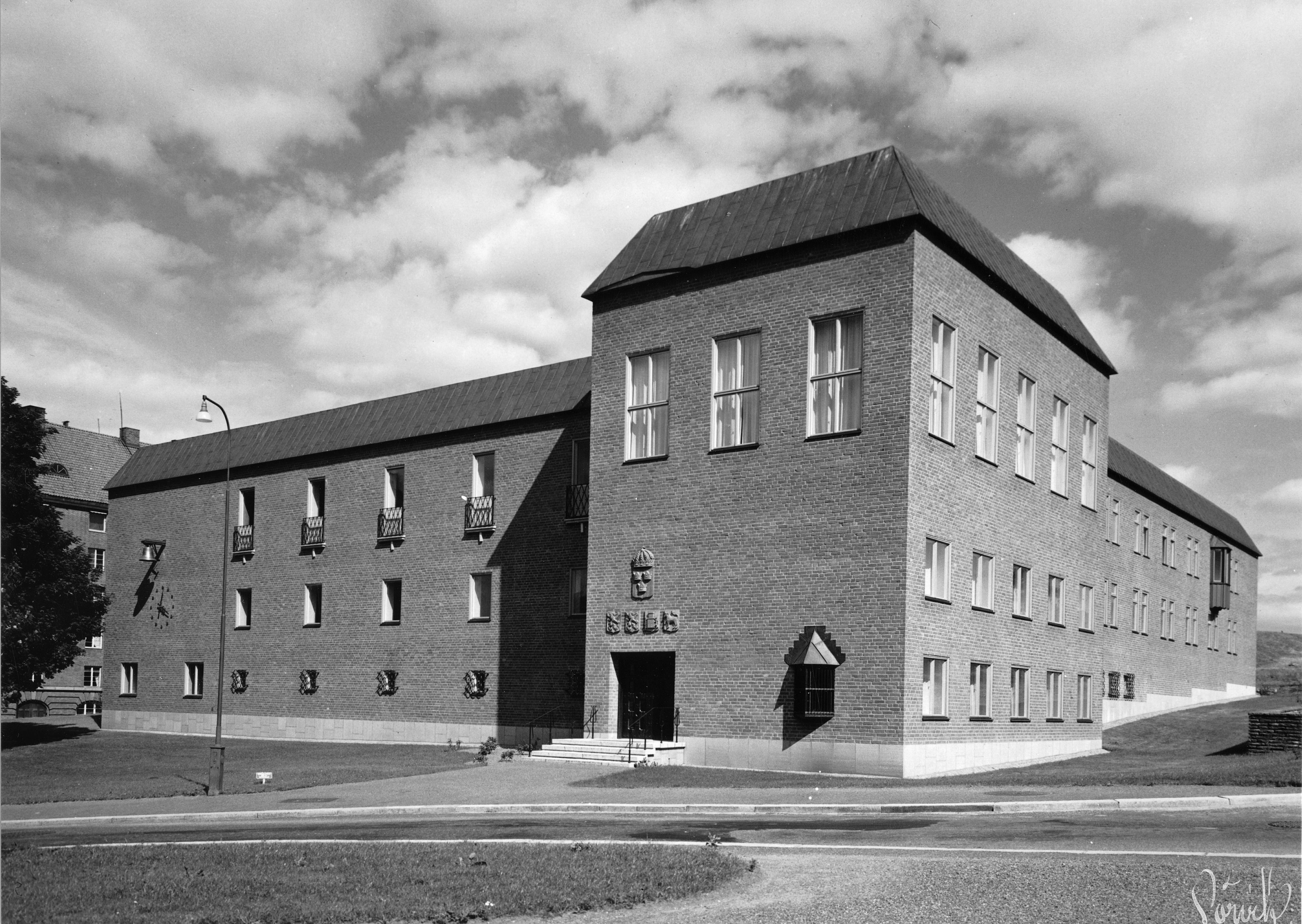
Western Sweden's court of appeal in Gothenburg

== References and sources ==
Other sources

- Nordic Classicism 1910–1930, Museum of Finnish Architecture, Helsinki, 1982
- Hakon Ahlberg, "Alvar Aalto", in The Finnish Architectural Review, 7,8/ 1976. Arkkitehti, 7–8/1976
- Hakon Ahlberg, "The Dilemma of Classicism", in Sigurd Lewerentz 1885–1975, Architectural Association Publications, London, 1989
- E. Paulsson et al., Hakon Ahlberg, Arkitekt och Humanist. Byggforskningsrådet, Stockholm, 1994
