= Édson (footballer, born 1930) =

Brazilian footballer (1930–1991)

Personal information
- Full name: Édson Campos Martins
- Date of birth: 12 July 1930
- Place of birth: Rio de Janeiro, Brazil
- Date of death: 12 August 1991 (aged 61)
- Position: Defender

Senior career*
Years	Team	Apps	(Gls)
1952–1956	Bangu		
1956–1957	Flamengo	19	(0)
1958	Botafogo		
1958–1959	Palmeiras	56	(0)

International career
1952	Brazil Olympic	3	(0)
- * Club domestic league appearances and goals

Édson Campos Martins (12 July 1930 – 12 August 1991) was a Brazilian footballer who played as a defender. He competed in the 1952 Summer Olympics.

== Honours ==
Palmeiras

- Campeonato Paulista: 1959
