= George Edwards (Australian footballer) =

Australian rules footballer

Personal information
- Full name: George John Edwards
- Born: 12 July 1927; Clifton Hill, Victoria
- Died: 15 August 1991 (aged 64); Richmond, Victoria
- Original team: Ivanhoe Amateurs
- Height: 185 cm (6 ft 1 in)
- Weight: 87 kg (192 lb)

Playing career^{1}
Years	Club	Games (Goals)
1948–53	Hawthorn	36 (13)
- ^{1} Playing statistics correct to the end of 1953.

George John Edwards (12 July 1927 – 15 August 1991) was an Australian rules footballer who played with Hawthorn in the Victorian Football League (VFL).
