= Johan Wiklander =

Swedish ice hockey player

- Born: June 9, 1981 (age 44) Hägersten, Sweden
- Height: 6 ft 0 in (183 cm)
- Weight: 192 lb (87 kg; 13 st 10 lb)
- Position: Winger
- Shot: Left
- Played for: Södertälje SK; HC TWK Innsbruck; HC Alleghe; Örebro HK
- Playing career: 2001–2018

Johan Wiklander (born June 9, 1981) is a Swedish former professional ice hockey player. He most notably played with Örebro HK of the Swedish Hockey League (SHL).

Wiklander made his Elitserien debut playing with Södertälje SK during the 2007–08 Elitserien season.
