= Lisa Engqvist =

Danish ceramist and graphic artist

Hedvig Elisabeth Birgitte Engqvist
- Born: 5 May 1914; Florence
- Died: 4 November 1989 (aged 75)
- Known for: Ceramics

Hedvig Elisabeth Birgitte Engqvist, commonly known as Lisa Engqvist, (1914–1989) was a Danish ceramist and graphic artist. She is remembered for her asymmetrical and figurative works. From the late 1960s, while working for Bing & Grondahl, she developed mass production models including jars and vases in abstract geometric shapes. In the early 1980s, she taught at the Jutland Art Academy.

== Biography ==
Born on 5 May 1914 in Florence, Italy, Hedevig Elisabeth Birgitta Hesler was the daughter of Anne Gunhilde Andersen Hesler (1874–1946). Her mother travelled to Florence as she did not want to give birth in Denmark. Thanks to the influence of her uncles, the painter Gudmund Hentze (1875–1948) and the sculptor Svend Rathsack (1885–1941), she grew up in a cultural milieu. After completing her schooling, she studied ceramics at the School of Arts and Crafts, earning her diploma in 1935. The same year, she married the architect Hans Henrik Engqvist (1912–2003). She died on 4 November 1989 in Lyngby, Denmark.

Engqvist initially worked for the potter Nathalie Krebs at her Saxbo stoneware workshop in Gladsaxe (1935–38). For the next ten years, she devoted herself to raising her three children, Lene Marie (1938) and the twins Anna Birgitte and Hedda Agnete (1943). In 1948, she established her own workshop in the family home in Lungby, soon becoming one of the more important potters in Denmark. She created both individual and mass-produced works, her creations often featuring the heads of birds or horses. She experimented with innovative glazing techniques, including Japanese raku traditions which she achieved in an over specially built on a farm in Hvalpsund in Himmerland where the family spend their holidays.

After spending two more years with Nathalie Krebs (1952–54), she joined Bing & Grøndahl where she developed production models, creating bottles, jars and vases with off-white, orange and cobalt-blue patterns on a white background (1965–70). In the early 1980s, she taught at the Jutland Art Academy until she began to suffer from poor health.

Engqvist exhibited widely in Denmark and abroad. A memorial exhibition was held in her honour at the Aarhus Art Academy in 1990.

Lisa Engqvist died in Lyngby on 4 November 1989.
