= Stan Brett =

Australian rules footballer, born 1913

Personal information
- Full name: Stan Brett
- Born: 7 March 1913
- Died: 25 August 1991 (aged 78)
- Original team: West Richmond
- Height: 178 cm (5 ft 10 in)
- Weight: 79 kg (174 lb)

Playing career^{1}
Years	Club	Games (Goals)
1938	Richmond	9 (5)
- ^{1} Playing statistics correct to the end of 1938.

Stan Brett (7 March 1913 – 25 August 1991) was a former Australian rules footballer who played with Richmond in the Victorian Football League (VFL).
