= Piet van Boxtel =

Dutch footballer

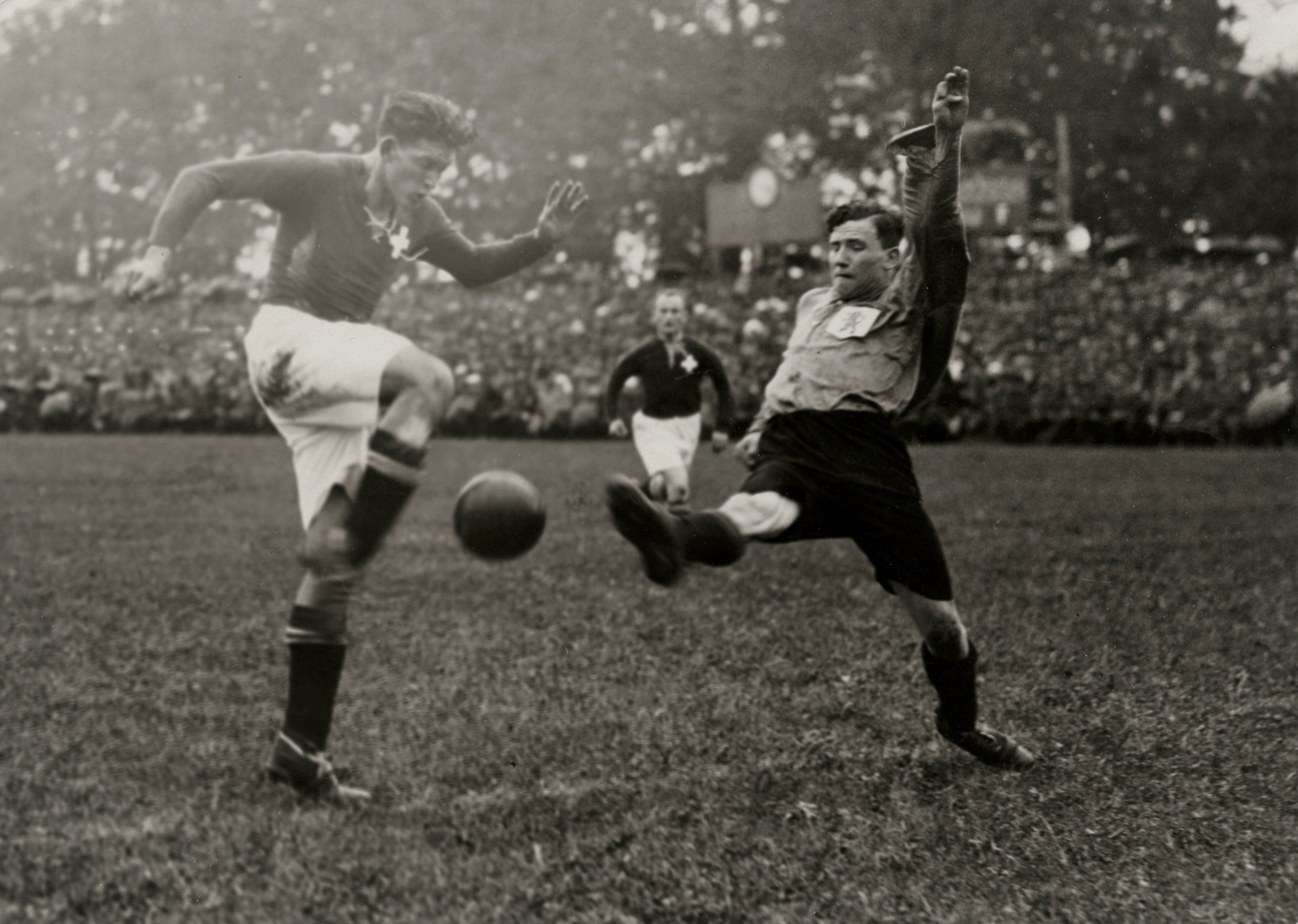
- Van Boxtel (right, 1928)

Personal information
- Full name: Petrus Cornelis van Boxtel
- Date of birth: 6 October 1902
- Place of birth: Breda, Netherlands
- Date of death: 27 August 1991 (aged 88)
- Place of death: Breda, Netherlands

Senior career*
| Years | Team | Apps | (Gls) |
| 1925–1928 | NAC | | |

International career
| 1927-1928 | Netherlands | 7 | (0) |
- * Club domestic league appearances and goals

Piet van Boxtel (6 October 1902 – 27 August 1991) was a Dutch footballer. He competed in the men's tournament at the 1928 Summer Olympics.

== International career ==
Van Boxtel made 7 international appearances for the Netherlands national team in the 1920s.
