= K. K. Jacob =

Indian educationist (1904–1991)

- Born: 3 August 1904; Aymanam, Kottayam, Kerala, India
- Died: 25 August 1991 (aged 87)
- Occupation: Educationist
- Years active: since 1931
- Spouse: Grace Mathai
- Awards: Padma Shri

Kunnenkeril Kuruvila Jacob (1904-1991) was an Indian educationist from the South Indian state of Kerala. Born on 3 August 1904 in a small hamlet of Aymanam in Kottayam district to Kuruvila of the Kunnenkeril house and educated at various places such as Kottayam, Thiruvananthapuram, Nagercoil, and Parur, Jacob did higher education at Leeds University. He started his career as the first Indian headmaster of Madras Christian College School, Chennai, in 1931 and retired from there in 1962. After retirement, he was in charge of Hyderabad Public School for seven years and, later, worked as the principal of Cathedral and John Connon School, Mumbai. He died on 25 August 1991. He was honored by the Government of India, in 1991, with the fourth highest Indian civilian award of Padma Shri. Jacob's students have started an initiative for bringing about innovation in teaching methodology under the name, Kuruvila Jacob Initiative.

== See also ==
- M. C. C. Higher Secondary School
- Hyderabad Public School
- The Cathedral & John Connon School
