= Kevin Hurley (footballer) =

Australian rules footballer, born 1914

Personal information
- Full name: Kevin Phillip Hurley
- Born: 24 January 1914; Merino, Victoria
- Died: 30 August 1991 (aged 77); Hamilton, Victoria
- Height: 178 cm (5 ft 10 in)
- Weight: 89 kg (196 lb)

Playing career^{1}
Years	Club	Games (Goals)
1942	North Melbourne	2 (1)
- ^{1} Playing statistics correct to the end of 1942.

Kevin Phillip Hurley (24 January 1914 – 30 August 1991) was an Australian rules footballer who played with North Melbourne in the Victorian Football League (VFL).
