= Ivan Bodin =

Swedish footballer (1923–1991)

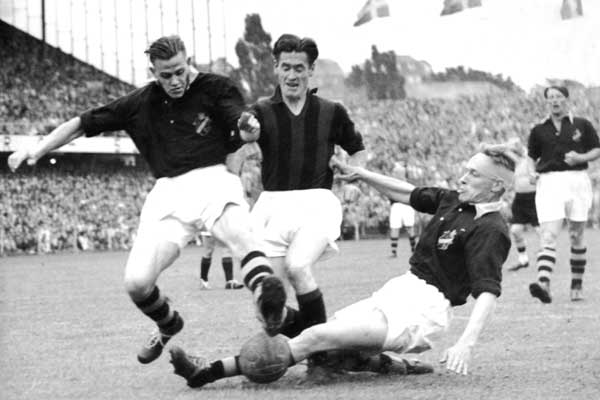
- Nils Liedholm stopped by Lennart Karlsson and Ivan Bodin.

Personal information
- Full name: Erik Ivan Bodin
- Date of birth: 20 July 1923
- Place of birth: Sundsvall, Sweden
- Date of death: 29 August 1991 (aged 68)
- Position: Defender

Senior career*
| Years | Team | Apps | (Gls) |
| 1947 | Mälarhöjdens IK | | |
| 1948–1955 | AIK Fotboll | 107 | (15) |

International career
| 1951 | Sweden | 1 | (0) |
- * Club domestic league appearances and goals

Erik Ivan Bodin (20 July 1923 – 29 August 1991) was a Swedish football defender who represented Sweden at the 1950 FIFA World Cup. He also played for AIK in Allsvenskan for six seasons. Besides football, Ivan also represented AIK in bandy. He was married to Britt and they had two children, who are named Gunilla and Lars.
