= Thomas Engqvist =

Swedish chess player (born 1963)

Personal information
- Born: 3 December 1963 (age 62)

Chess career
- Country: Sweden
- Title: International Master (1993)
- Peak rating: 2440 (January 1994)

Thomas Engqvist (born 6 December 1963) is a Swedish chess player and author.

== Chess career ==
Engqvist was born on 6 December 1963. He began playing chess in the autumn of 1976, at the age of twelve, when he joined SK 33, a small chess club in Enköping. The first chess books he read were by the Swedish grandmaster Gideon Ståhlberg.

He won an IM tournament in Titograd in 1991, and came third in the Swedish Championships of 1992 and 1993.

He was awarded the title of International Master in 1993, at the age of twenty-nine.

His highest FIDE rating was 2440, which he achieved in January 1994.

He became a member of SK Rockaden in 1995, and won the club championship in 2006–2007.

== Writing career ==
Petrosian: Move by Move (2014) was nominated for the English Chess Federation's Book of the Year Award. Ray Edwards and Julian Farrand stated: "According to Kasparov, Petrosian had a very distinctive style, the key to which even the greatest players could not locate. Engqvist has made a determined effort to find it in this excellent selection of 60 best games of a much underrated world champion."

Reviewing Stein: Move by Move (2015) for Chess Life, John Hartmann wrote: "Thomas Engqvist does an impressive job of contextualizing each of the 60 thoroughly annotated games in Stein: MBM, explaining who the opponents were and incorporating extensive research into the notes. He carefully traces Stein's progression from "new Tal" to complete player, attributing some of the shift to Petrosian's influence. All of this makes for a wonderful book, and it should become the standard work on Stein's life and games."

In a review of Chess Lessons from a Champion Coach (2023), Raymond Keene wrote: "Engqvist's Chess Lessons is an excellent book and I recommend it for its historical, pedagogical and literary values. It is, in fact, a concise account of the intellectual development of chess over the past five centuries."

Engqvist has written two books on Ulf Andersson (one in Swedish and one in English). Reviewing Ulf the Attacker (2025) for The Washington Times, David R. Sands said Engqvist shone "an unexpected light on one of his country's best and most popular players of the modern era". Engqvist has stated that, of all Andersson's game, his favourite is the game Andersson played against Anatoly Karpov in Milan in 1975.

== Publications ==
=== In English ===
- Petrosian: Move by Move. Everyman. 2014. ISBN 978-1-78194-180-5.
- Stein: Move by Move. Everyman. 2015. ISBN 978-1-78194-269-7.
- Chess Strategy for Kids. Gambit. 2016. ISBN 978-1-910093-87-0.
- Réti: Move by Move. Everyman. 2017. ISBN 978-1-78194-384-7.
- 300 Most Important Chess Positions. Batsford. 2018. ISBN 978-1-84994-512-7.
- 300 Most Important Tactical Chess Positions. Batsford. 2021. ISBN 978-1-84994-612-4.
- 300 Most Important Chess Exercises. Batsford. 2022. ISBN 978-1-84994-751-0.
- Chess Lessons from a Champion Coach. Batsford. 2023. ISBN 978-1-84994-804-3.
- The Caro-Kann: The Easy Way. Batsford. 2023. ISBN 978-1-84994-816-6.
- The Scandinavian Defense Revisited. Thinkers. 2025. ISBN 978-94-93435-07-0.
- Ulf the Attacker. New in Chess. 2025. ISBN 978-90-834834-4-3.
- Capablanca: The Chess Machine. Batsford. 2026. ISBN 978-1-83733-058-4.

=== In Swedish ===
- Schackets Mästare: I huvudet på Ulf Andersson. With Robert Okpu. Sportförlaget i Europa. 2019. ISBN 978-91-87589-28-7.
