= Andrei Sibiryakov =

Soviet serial killer

- Born: Andrei Vladimirovich Sibiryakov; 28 February 1964; Leningrad, RSFSR
- Died: 5 August 1991 (aged 27); Leningrad, RSFSR
- Cause of death: Execution by shooting
- Other names: "The Maniac from Lenenergo" "The Elusive One"
- Conviction: Murder
- Penalty: Death

Details
- Victims: 5
- Span of crimes: 1988–1989
- Country: Soviet Union
- State: Leningrad
- Date apprehended: January 1989

Andrei Vladimirovich Sibiryakov (Russian: Андре́й Влади́мирович Сибиряко́в; 28 February 1964 – 5 August 1991), known as The Maniac from Lenenergo (Russian: Маньяк из Ленэнерго), was a Soviet serial killer who killed five people between December 1988 and January 1989.

== Biography ==
Sibiryakov was born in Leningrad on 28 February 1964. At a young age, he was first convicted of hooliganism, and after his release, he married. The absence of any prospects and his reluctance to work eventually led Sibiryakov down a criminal path. By the time of his attacks, he lived in the city of Pushkin (a municipal town in St. Petersburg). Subsequently, the interior minister of the homicide department of the Central Internal Affairs Directorate of St. Petersburg, Alexander Malyshev, who directly participated in the investigation of Sibiryakov's crimes, said the following about him:

They could only take it to the construction site, but in the same place it's necessary to work. He went there several times, with only construction clothes to wear and did not go out anymore...

Sibiryakov was characterized as extremely cowardly, being too afraid to confess to his wife that he had been fired from his job for absenteeism. Every day he spent hours walking around Pushkin and, after some time, stumbled upon the burial site of Grigori Rasputin. According to Sibiryakov, at that moment he felt that he deserved more in his life, and afterwards, he came more than once to Rasputin's grave. He decided that at this point he got "energy feeding".

Sibiryakov committed each assault the same way: he introduced himself as an employee of the municipal engineering company "Lenenergo," then broke into apartments where there were only single women, killing and robbing them afterwards. In just a few weeks, he committed six attacks; five of them (on Nadezhda Mironovich, Elena Aleksandrova, two women named Deyeva and Valentinova, and Tatyana Pavlova) were fatal. In the other case, the victim, Viktoria Bodumyan, miraculously survived because, after striking her with a knife, the killer broke the handle. During an attempted attack, Sibiryakov was frightened off and did not manage to finish the crime. His modus operandi in many respects was similar to that of Vladimir Ionesyan, who had murdered 25 years before.

=== Arrest ===
When he learned that his crimes were on the popular TV show "600 Seconds," Sibiryakov was so filled with pride for what he had done and, believing in his own impunity, sent an anonymous letter to the Central Internal Affairs Directorate of Leningrad demanding 50,000 rubles to stop the crimes. He demanded an answer through the same telecast.

In one of the issues, the presenter of "600 Seconds" Alexander Nevzorov said:

To the one who wrote the letter. The administration of the Leningrad GUVD accepts your conditions. Call the specified phone number...

The next day, Sibiryakov called and arranged a meeting on the railway platform "Prospect Glory" in Pushkin. He dressed in construction clothes and wore a helmet, which he owned from his previous job. Snatching money from the police car, the killer rushed to get away, crossing the railway tracks right in front of a train in order to escape law enforcement officers. However, on the other side, there was an on-duty policeman who rushed after him in pursuit. They noticed that the killer had disappeared into a basement, and blocked him. He then changed clothes and tried to leave through the entrance, but was detained. Soon after his arrest, the killer confessed to his crimes. At his home, most of the stolen items were found, and Sibiryakov's neighbours subsequently retrieved gold items that had been robbed from them.

The court sentenced Andrei Sibiryakov to death, and he was executed by shooting on 5 August 1991.

== See also ==
- List of Russian serial killers
