= Jonatan Habib Engqvist =

Swedish art historian, art critic and curator

Jonatan Habib Engqvist is a Swedish author and curator. He is educated in philosophy and art history at Södertörn University and art theory at Konstfack. He works internationally and has curated several art biennials.

== Teaching ==
Engqvist has taught at Royal Institute of Art in Stockholm, and at Royal Academy of Arts (KABK) in the Hague, Netherlands at The New School in New York City, Academy of Fine Arts in Riga and at Stockholm University. He is a mentor at the University of the Arts Helsinki alongside Angela Rosenberg.

== Art curation ==
In Sweden, Engqvist has curated exhibitions at Moderna Museet, Borås Art Museum, Färgfabriken, Kalmar Art Museum, Vandalorum. In 2016, he was the curator of Konsthall Jönköping public artwork "Public Face" by Julius von Bismarck, Benjamin Maus, and Richard Wilhelmer which consisted of an 8-meter-high neon mobile smiley on Jönköping City Hall's roof. It was connected to facial recognition and read the emotions of Jönköping residents in real-time.

Abroad, he has curated exhibitions at the Museo de Geología in Mexico, the National Gallery of Iceland, as well as international biennials and festivals such as the Havana Biennial, Cycle Music And Art Festival in Berlin / Reykjavík / Koparvogur (2018), Survival Kit 9 in Riga, Latvia, Sinopale 6, Sinop, Turkey (2017), Tunnel Vision, 8th Momentum biennial in Moss, Norway (2015) and (I)ndependent People at Reykjavik Arts Festival (2012). He was also the curator of the Project Biennial D-0 Ark Underground in Tito's bunker in Bosnia (2019) with Basak Senova and Branko Franceschi which was entitled Do secret services dream of a museum? The exhibition included artists such as Bella Rune and Yoko Ono. On behalf of the Nordic Art Association, he curated the first VR Pavilion at the Venice Biennale in 2019 with "Medusa" a 360°virtual reality film by the Venetian artist and filmmaker Sara Tirelli.

== Collaborations ==
He has worked with advanced VR productions together with the artist couple Lundahl & Seitl and ScanLab.

== Other assignments ==
Engqvist founded and directs Curatorial Residency in Stockholm (CRIS). He is the chairman of The Swedish Association of Curators.

== Bibliography ==
- Jonatan Habib Engqvist and Lars Erik Hjertström Lappalainen. Big Dig, CLP Works, 2018. ISBN 9789198134186
- Kristina Bength and Jonathan Habib Engqqvist, Jan Rydén, Sigrid Sandström. Studio Talks: Thinking Through Painting, Arvinius + Orfeus Publishing, 2014 ISBN 9789187543548
- Jonatan Habib Engqvist. In Dependence – Collaboration and Artists' Initiatives, Torpedo Press, 2013. ISBN 978-82-93104-08-7
- Jonatan Habib Engqvist. "Just as money is Paper, so a gallery is a room" in Work, Work, Work – A Reader on Art and Labour, Steinberg Press, 2012 ISBN 978-3943365160
- Jonatan Habib Engqvist and Maria Lantz. Dharavi: Documenting Informalities, KKH, 2008, Academic Foundation, New Delhi 2009 ISBN 978-1853397103
- Jonathan Habib Engqvist and Nina Möntmann. Agencies of Art: A report on the situation of small and medium-sized art centers in Denmark, Norway and Sweden, OK BOOK, Oslo, 2018. ISBN 978-82-7531-004-8
