= Mälarhöjdens IK =

Swedish football club

- Full name: Mälarhöjdens Idrottsklubb
- Nickname: MIK
- Founded: 20 March 1924
- Ground: Mälarhöjdens IP; Hägersten; Stockholm; Sweden
- Chairman: Tommy Pettersson
- League: Division 4 Stockholm Södra
- 2017: Division 4 Stockholm Södra, 12th
Home colours

Mälarhöjdens IK were a Swedish football club located in Hägersten in the southern part of Stockholm. They merged with Hägersten SK in 2018 to become Mälarhöjden-Hägersten FF.

== Background ==
Mälarhöjdens Idrottsklubb (MIK) was formed on 20 March 1924. The club currently has about 1,600 members divided into sections covering football, athletics, walking, hockey, orienteering, skiing and tennis. The club's greatest achievements have been in athletics, particularly in middle and long distance running events in the 1960s and 1970s. In 1945 the club enjoyed a season in the Allsvenskan for bandy.

Since their foundation Mälarhöjdens IK has participated mainly in the middle and lower divisions of the Swedish football league system. The club currently plays in Division 4 Södra Stockholm which is the sixth tier of Swedish football. They play their home matches at the Mälarhöjdens IP in Hägersten.

Mälarhöjdens IK are affiliated to the Stockholms Fotbollförbund.

== Recent history ==
In recent seasons Mälarhöjdens IK have competed in the following divisions:

2017 Division IV, Stockholm Södra
2016 Division IV, Stockholm Södra
2015 Division IV, Stockholm Södra
2014 Division IV, Stockholm Mellersta
2013 Division IV, Stockholm Mellersta
2012 Division IV, Stockholm Södra
2011 Division IV, Stockholm Södra
2010 Division III, Östra Svealand
2009 Division IV, Stockholm Södra
2008 Division IV, Stockholm Södra
2007 Division IV, Stockholm Södra
2006 Division IV, Stockholm Södra
2005 Division IV, Stockholm Södra
2004 Division IV, Stockholm Mellersta
2003 Division IV, Stockholm Mellersta
2002 Division IV, Stockholm Mellersta
2001 Division IV, Stockholm Södra
2000 Division IV, Stockholm Södra
1999 Division IV, Stockholm Södra
1998 Division IV, Stockholm Södra
