= Fruängen =

Urban district in Stockholm, Sweden

Coordinates: 59°17′09″N 17°57′54″E

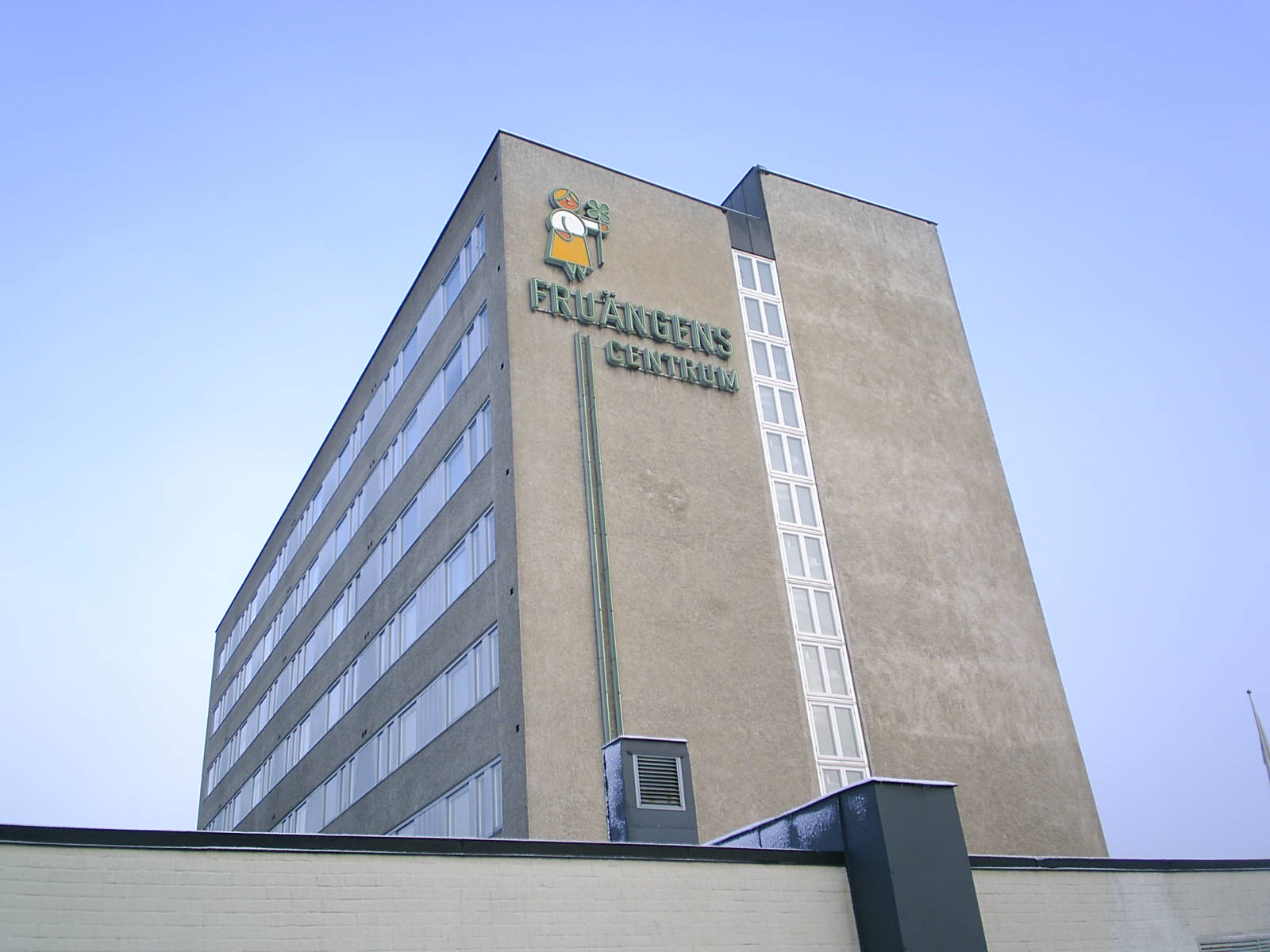
High rise building in central Fruängen

Fruängen (lit. 'Lady's Meadow') is a district in Stockholm, Sweden. It is part of the Hägersten-Liljeholmen borough in Söderort, the southern suburban area of Stockholm. It was built in the early 1950s.

The streets in Fruängen are named after famous Swedish women like Agnes Lagerstedt, Anna Sandström, Karolina Widerström, Ellen Fries, Ellen Key, Elsa Beskow, Elin Wägner, Elsa Borg, Elsa Brändström, Eva Bonnier, Fredrika Bremer, Hanna Pauli, Hanna Rydh, Jenny Nyström, Karin Boye, Kata Dalström, Kerstin Hesselgren, Lina Sandell and Jenny Lind.

A number of famous Swedes come from Fruängen. Examples include Gunnel Fred, Rolf Ridderwall, Fredde Granberg, Tomas Andersson Wij, Pontus Enhörning, Susanne Ljung and script writer Lars Lundström.

The name Fruängen translates as lady's or ladies' meadow or possibly Our Lady's meadow. According to one source, Fruängen was the name of a torp (croft), while another source states the name is constructed as an analogy to the city borough Herrängen (master's meadow or lord's meadow) which is named after another croft.

== See also ==
- Fruängen metro station
