= Hägersten =

Urban district in south Stockholm, Sweden

Coordinates: 59°18′23.74″N 17°58′55.67″E

Hägersten (Heronstone) is an urban district of Stockholm. It is located in the borough of Hägersten-Liljeholmen, which was formed 1 January 2007 by merging the former boroughs of Hägersten and Liljeholmen.
