= Skarpnäck =

Skarpnäck may refer to:

- Skarpnäck borough in Stockholm, Sweden
- Skarpnäck metro station, a Stockholm metro station
- Skarpnäck parish, a Church of Sweden parish in Stockholm, Sweden
- Skarpnäcksfältet, a subdistrict in Skarpnäcks Gård district, Skarpnäck borough
- Skarpnäck Airfield, a former airfield
