= Matija Sovdat =

Swedish murderer (born 1975)

- Born: Matija Vladimir Sovdat; 13 February 1975 (age 51); Skärholmen, Stockholm, Sweden
- Citizenship: Yugoslav/Slovenian (Note: In the 1990 census, he was listed as having Yugoslav citizenship, and in the media he was described after the murders as a Slovenian citizen (after his father, who was from Slovenia). Before the breakup of Yugoslavia in 1991, Yugoslav citizens held both Yugoslav citizenship and an internal citizenship of their respective republic (Serbia, Croatia, Bosnia and Herzegovina, Slovenia, North Macedonia, or Montenegro). See here.)
- Education: Stockholm Institute of Education (1996–98)
- Occupation: Student teacher (Note: At the time of the murders.)
- Status: Gradual release from 2000 (Note: On 26 April 2000, 1 year, 4 months, and 8 days after Sovdat's sentence was handed down, he was granted his first leave/round privilege (frigång). From autumn 2002 until June 2003, Sovdat had been a free man for up to 60 hours per week.)
- Convictions: Murder (3 counts); Drug offence; Violation of the Knife Act
- Penalty: Forensic psychiatric care
- Capture status: Released

Details
- Victims: 3
- Span of crimes: July 1996 – May 1998
- Country: Sweden
- Locations: Bagarmossen (1996); Skarpnäcks gård (1998)
- Weapons: 1st murder: fish knife, broom, screwdriver, hammer 2nd murder: knife, crowbar, hammer, club
- Date apprehended: 6 May 1998
- Imprisoned at: Karsudden Hospital (1999–2003)

Matija Vladimir Sovdat (born 13 February 1975) is a Swedish individual convicted of three murders committed in Stockholm in the 1990s. Born in Skärholmen to immigrant parents from Slovenia and Serbia, Sovdat grew up in a household reportedly affected by domestic violence. He attended school in Stockholm, initially in a Serbo-Croatian program before transferring to a Swedish-language class, and was described by classmates as intelligent and physically strong. As a teenager, Sovdat engaged in criminal activities, including theft, assault, and drug offenses.

Between 1996 and 1998, Sovdat committed three confirmed murders. In 1996, he killed Henry Karlsson in Bagarmossen, and in 1998, he murdered David Eklund and Harriet Illerström in Skarpnäcks gård, inflicting extreme violence on all victims. He was arrested in May 1998, confessed to the murders, and underwent a forensic psychiatric examination. The Stockholm District Court concluded that he suffered from a severe mental disorder at the time of the offenses and, in December 1998, sentenced him to institutional psychiatric care with special discharge review, the only sanction available under Swedish law for individuals in his situation.

During his treatment, Sovdat was gradually granted temporary leaves for studies, internships, and recreational activities. Between 2000 and 2003, he received 42 leaves, some allowing up to 60 hours per week outside the hospital, including weekend trips and stays abroad. In 2006, he was permitted to move into his own residence outside the hospital, effectively granting him considerable freedom while remaining under forensic psychiatric supervision. These extensive privileges drew criticism from the victims' relatives and law enforcement officials, who argued that the system underestimated the risk posed by an individual convicted of exceptionally violent crimes. Police investigators described Sovdat as highly manipulative, extremely dangerous, and capable of deriving sexual gratification from violence, emphasizing concerns that controlled hospital settings did not reflect the risks present in real-world environments.

Authorities and the courts defended the gradual release as a standard part of psychiatric treatment and rehabilitation, noting that the decisions were made with input from hospital physicians and prosecutors, and under supervision of the County Administrative Court. Nevertheless, the case has continued to spark debate in Sweden regarding the balance between psychiatric treatment, public safety, and victims' rights, particularly when individuals convicted of severe violent crimes are granted extended leaves and semi-independent living.

== Biography ==
=== Early life ===
Matija Vladimir Sovdat was born on 13 February 1975 in Skärholmen Parish, in Skärholmen, Stockholm Municipality, Sweden. His father, Lovrenc Sovdat (1947–1995), came from Slovenia in what was then Yugoslavia, and his mother, Jelica Cokorovic (born 1948), was of Serbian origin and came from the area around Belgrade. Sovdat's parents met in Hallstahammar in Västmanland in the early 1970s. The father had come to Sweden a few years earlier. He had a daughter (born in 1968 in Hallstahammar) from a previous marriage, who now became part of the family. In 1971, the newly formed couple had their first child together, a daughter.

The family moved to Stockholm in 1973 and settled at Storholmsbackarna 72 in Vårberg. Two years later, Matija Sovdat was born, the same year his parents married. According to the mother, the father had already begun at this time to subject the family to serious harassment and violence, something she later described as a deeply traumatic experience she would not wish on anyone else. There were reports suggesting that the father may have had schizophrenia. The mother said that he both beat and threatened her, often after coming home late at night, and that people in their surroundings even feared that she would be killed. The children were also affected by the father's violent behavior; according to the mother, Sovdat was subjected to abuse on several occasions, including when he tried to defend her and was thrown into a wall. The father was later convicted of assaulting the mother. In 1980 the relationship broke down, followed by a very stressful custody dispute, and the divorce became official in 1981. Eventually, the mother was awarded custody of the children they had together, after years that she described as being entirely devoted to protecting herself and the children. In 1983, the mother and children moved from Pepparvägen 44 in Hökarängen to Svartågatan 82 in Bagarmossen.

=== School years and youth ===
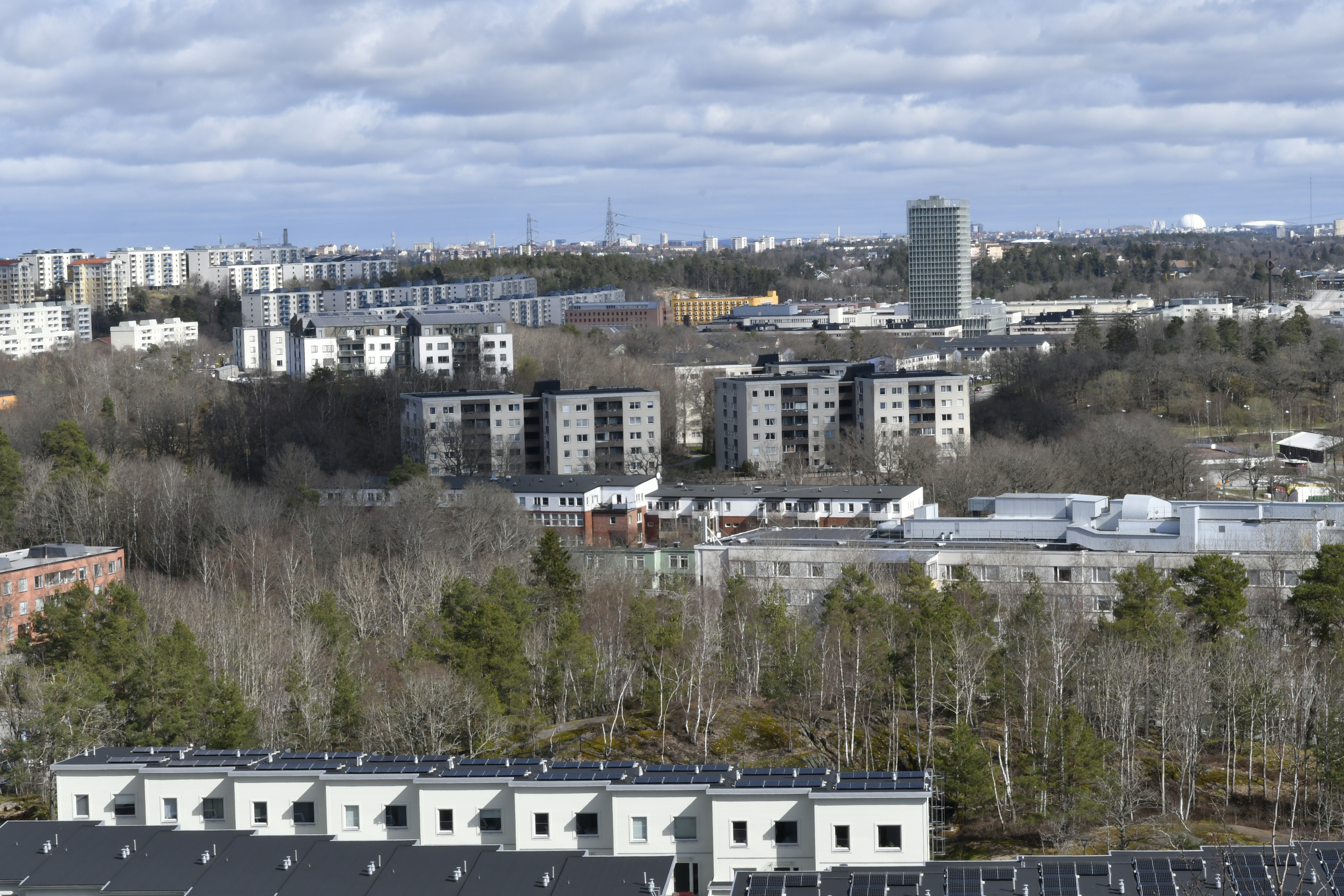
Sovdat grew up at Storholmsbackarna 72 in Vårberg (the building in the middle behind the four in the picture).

Sovdat attended a Serbo-Croatian class during his first seven years of schooling, but later transferred to a school in a southern suburb. He preferred to attend a Swedish-language class, as he was born and raised in Sweden. The class was ambitious and consisted mostly of girls. Sovdat lived in an apartment, while most of the other students came from single-family home areas. Because he was one year younger than most of his classmates, he did not socialize much with them, instead gravitating more toward other former Yugoslavs at the school. His classmates described him as calm and fairly anonymous within the group; he was neither someone who stayed completely in the background nor someone who took on a leadership role. He was intelligent and sharp, but generally attended classes without standing out in any particular way. His grades from compulsory school were average, with a "4" in his native language, Serbo-Croatian, and otherwise mainly "2s" and "3s." As a teenager, Sovdat became more interested in sports than in school. His particular focus was strength training, and he spent many hours at the gym in the southern suburb and in the training room at the youth center. He also trained in Muay Thai. People around him emphasized that he was careful about his body and physical condition and that, unlike many others in his circle, he did not use anabolic steroids. He was described as athletic and physically strong, ran a lot, and took care of his health.

The first warning signs appeared early. Sovdat was only 13 when he was reported to the police for shoplifting and attempted burglary. At 14, he assaulted a peer, breaking the victim's jaw in several places. After completing compulsory school, he began upper secondary school but dropped out after three months. Police surveillance officers observed him in Grynkvarnsparken in Johanneshov, a known hangout for drug dealers. He was also seen together with heroin users at T-Centralen metro station. At the age of 16, he was repeatedly arrested while carrying knives. In 1992, he was caught selling hashish and received a suspended sentence. The following year, social services wrote to the district court: "Sovdat is a 17-year-old boy who has long lived with substance abuse...".

On Saturday, 25 April 1993, when Sovdat was 18 years old, he began the evening at his girlfriend's home in the southern suburb. Around nine o'clock he went to a friend's place, and from there he called another acquaintance to arrange a meeting at the local square. A few hours and a few beers later, the group moved on to the Monte Carlo restaurant at the corner of Sveavägen and Kungsgatan in central Stockholm. The girlfriend stayed behind at home to look for a missing kitten. At the urinal area, Sovdat was standing just to the right of a somewhat older man. Suddenly, he became upset and asked whether the man was looking at him, then made a remark about his own body size. The incident quickly escalated. Witnesses described how Sovdat delivered two quick punches that struck the man's face, paused briefly, and then threw an even harder punch while the man was still standing. Witnesses perceived him as someone who knew how to fight, and one of them described how he even jumped on the fallen man's head. The man's dental bills amounted to 5,000 kronor, (Note: 5,000 kronor in 1993 corresponds to 8,576 kronor in December 2025 (USD 961.94).) and Sovdat himself was sentenced to two weeks in prison, his first conviction for a violent crime. He later told the district court that something inside him had snapped. The youths in the loosely organized group—consisting of around 30 teenagers who used the center of the southern suburb as a meeting place in the late 1980s—described Sovdat as an ordinary guy and a good friend. He was someone who was supportive and generally decent, and they therefore found it difficult to imagine him as a mass murderer when they later heard about it.

=== Studies ===
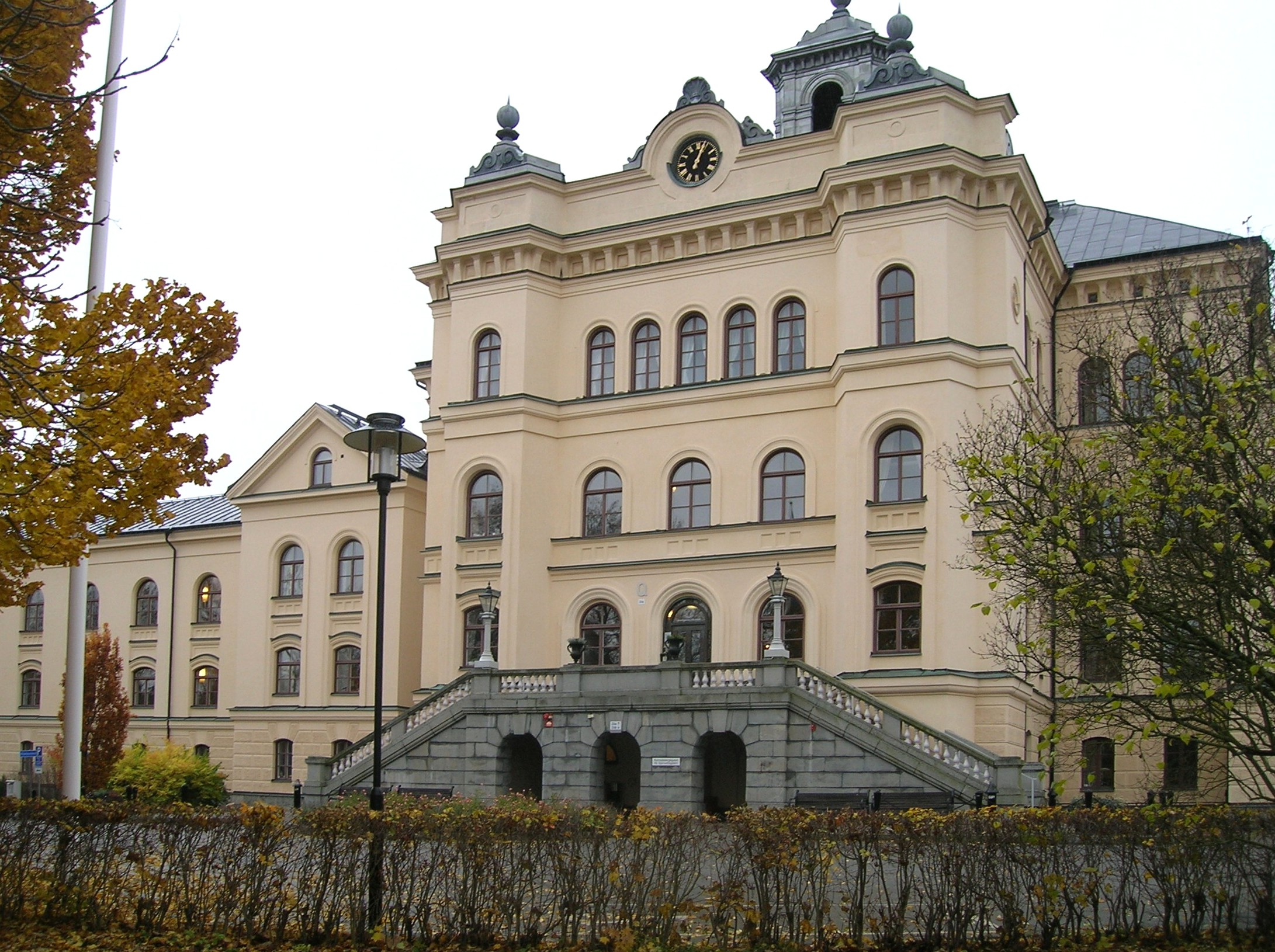
Stockholm Institute of Education where Sovdat was studying at the time of the murders

After his father's death in 1995, Sovdat's life appeared to take a turn for the better. He began studying social anthropology at university and was perceived by fellow students as ambitious, intelligent, and active in group discussions. In a short period of time, he had gone from socializing in drug-related environments to university corridors, something that made his family proud. As a child of the suburbs with an immigrant background, he was on his way to establishing himself in the academic world.

Between 1996 and 1998, Sovdat studied at the Stockholm Institute of Education. Prior to his admission, he had already studied social anthropology and spent the summer of 1996 preparing to pass a retake examination. During the teacher education program, he took courses including Swedish Language and Language Development (10 credits), accumulated credits in pedagogy, and completed several standalone courses. Despite his determination, he was described by the principal as a "normal student." At the same time, there was internal criticism concerning the fact that he already had prior convictions for assault and drug offenses at the time of application, which raised questions about his suitability as a future teacher, even though such factors were not allowed to be considered in the admissions process.

According to his mother, his dream was to become a teacher. Sovdat had studied at several schools with good grades and showed strong commitment to his education. During his studies, he lived with his mother in Bagarmossen. His room gave the impression of an orderly student life, with books, a desk, training equipment, sports gear, a graduation photograph, and a Lamborghini poster on the wall. His mother also said that he enjoyed reading authors such as Stephen King, Agatha Christie, and Edgar Allan Poe.

At the same time, family members, friends, and police sources described Sovdat as a person with a contradictory personality. He could be perceived as intelligent, determined, and charming, but also as dominant, violent, and struggling with drug abuse. A former girlfriend described him as "Dr. Jekyll and Mr. Hyde," stating that many people were afraid of him, while he could at the same time be very polite toward women. The police noted the same duality and stated that he could quickly shift into violent outbursts of rage if he felt threatened or insulted.

== Murders ==
=== First murder ===
Henry Karlsson (74) was murdered on 18 July 1996 in his home at Byälvsvägen 169 in Bagarmossen. He was found dead by social services on the morning of 26 July 1996 and was assessed to have been deceased for a considerable period of time, likely several weeks. Initially, the police reported that Karlsson had been killed by stabbing, and at first a murder during a robbery was suspected. Later investigation showed that the murder had been committed using several different implements. He had been beaten with fists, strangled with a belt, and then a fish knife and a broom had been used. After Karlsson was dead, the perpetrator drove a screwdriver into his heart with a hammer.

=== Initial investigation ===
The borough of Skarpnäck in southern Stockholm
Key locations:
1 Byälvsvägen 169 in Bagarmossen: first murder
2 Flyghamnsgatan 11 in Skarpnäcks gård: second murders
3 Svartågatan 82 in Bagarmossen: the home of Matija Sovdat

The police initially found no traces of the perpetrator and had not been able to contact any witnesses who had observed anything related to the murder. On 27 July 1996, the police conducted door-to-door inquiries in the area in the hope that neighbors had seen or heard something. Bengt Wingqvist, head of investigations at the Stockholm County Criminal Police (länskriminalen i Stockholm), confirmed that the man had been killed but declined to comment on the method used.

In early August 1996, a man and a woman in their 40s were arrested on suspicion of the murder. The man was taken into custody on Thursday, 1 August 1996, and the woman on the following Friday morning. Neither the police nor the prosecutor wanted to comment on the suspicions against the couple.

In November 1996, a 15-year-old boy was instead arrested as a suspect in the murder of Henry Karlsson. He was held on the lowest level of suspicion, "suspected on probable cause," and was placed in a youth home because he was too young to be held in a detention center. Deputy prosecutor Carita Liljeström stated on 20 November 1996 that she needed to decide whether the boy should be remanded again, which depended on whether the police could strengthen the evidence. The police suspected that the motive might have been revenge, as the 74-year-old Karlsson had previously been convicted multiple times for sexual harassment of children and was known in the area for molesting children and exposing himself. The boy admitted that he had been in the man's apartment a few times before the murder but denied killing him.

The police found a shoe print in the apartment. This led them to contact shoe retailers across the country in an attempt to identify the pattern, but without success. The suspicions against the boy were instead based on other surveillance and the fact that he knew the murdered man.

The suspected boy, who was 17 at the time of the damages ruling, was awarded 10,000 kronor in compensation by the Chancellor of Justice in October 1998 for having been detained and remanded between 11 and 14 November 1996. He was released due to his young age and placed in a youth home. However, police suspicions remained until September 1997, when the prosecutor decided not to press charges.

=== Second murder ===
David Eklund (22) and Harriet Illerström (21) were murdered on 1 May 1998 at Flyghamnsgatan 11 in Skarpnäcks gård. In the same act of violence, the couple's dog, a Cavalier King Charles Spaniel named Sussie, was also killed. The murders were carried out with extreme brutality. The perpetrator used five different weapons—two knives, a hammer, a crowbar, and a club. David and Harriet suffered more than 200 injuries between them, and Harriet’s eyes had been cut out. After murdering the couple, the perpetrator moved the bodies to the bathroom, where he placed them on top of each other in a cross formation.

The crime scene showed clear signs of struggle and defense from the victims. The autopsy revealed that David had been subjected to about 50 cuts and blows, while Harriet had significantly more injuries than the perpetrator later admitted in interrogations. The couple had just returned from a birthday celebration and had spent the Walpurgis Night weekend in the apartment, but two days later, on Sunday, their bodies were discovered by Harriet's older sister, who had come to visit.

Investigators described the murders as exceptionally brutal and ruthless, and it quickly became clear that the perpetrator had planned and executed the act with extreme overkill.

== Investigation ==
=== Early investigation and arrest ===
Around 3 p.m. on 3 May 1998, the police found David and Harriet dead in their apartment in Skarpnäcks gård. That same afternoon, the police conducted door-to-door inquiries in the area. On Walpurgis Night, the couple had hosted a party, and the police interviewed several people who had been in the apartment during the evening. Everything indicated that the murders had been preceded by some form of struggle. On 4 May, the Söderort Police (Söderortspolisen) opened a tip line to receive information from the public. A forensic investigation was carried out on Monday, 4 May, and on Tuesday the bodies were autopsied. About twenty police officers worked on the case, which was described as ruthless and exceptionally brutal. The police suspected that Harriet had tried to help David escape his attacker and noted that she had several typical defensive injuries. Five people who had been in the apartment on Walpurgis Night were questioned, and several pieces of evidence were secured—including fingerprints on weapons, a jacket, and a bicycle that could possibly be linked to the perpetrator.

On 6 May 1998, Matija Sovdat was arrested at his mother's home at 82 Svartågatan in Bagarmossen, reasonably suspected of murder—that is, the lower degree of suspicion under Swedish law. At the time of his arrest, he was heavily under the influence of Rohypnol and alcohol. He had abused Rohypnol for an extended period and had memory gaps regarding what had happened. The police secured, among other things, Sovdat's fingerprints at the crime scene, as well as bloodstained clothing and a bloodstained knife in his residence and in a garbage bin. On 8 May, the prosecutor requested that Sovdat be remanded in custody at the Stockholm District Court. Technicians had found fingerprints and shoe prints, and the evidence was considered compelling. At that time, Sovdat denied the act. On 9 May, Sovdat was remanded in custody on probable cause, suspected of the double murder, by the on-call court of the Stockholm District Court.

On 24 June, it was decided at the remand review hearing that Sovdat would undergo a forensic psychiatric examination (Rättspsykiatrisk undersökning, RPU). A few weeks earlier, he had confessed to the murders. Sovdat, who was acquainted with David, was unable during questioning to provide a clear motive, but hinted that he was jealous of David's relationship with Harriet.

=== Connection to a previous murder ===
One of the police officers who arrested Sovdat during the night at his home had also investigated the murder of Karlsson. That detective superintendent (kriminalkommissarie) had traveled around Europe searching for a distinctive set of footprints made by a particular pair of sandals. The detective superintendent had been brought in from another district due to a staff shortage. During the commotion in the apartment as they were escorting Sovdat out, he kicked over a shoe rack, and the detective superintendent saw the sandals and recognized them immediately. The forensic laboratory was then able to link him to the murder.

Memory researcher Sven Å. Christianson was involved in the interrogations of Sovdat in an attempt to get him to talk. On 9 July 1998, Sovdat confessed during police questioning to the murder of Karlsson. He then described in detail how it had happened. The police had made early connections to the Karlsson murder. A shoe print was found in the apartment, and when Sovdat was arrested, a pair of sandals was found in his home whose tread pattern a detective immediately recognized. The shoes also contained traces of Karlsson's blood. The police suspected that Sovdat had committed several other serious violent crimes.

=== Suspicions of additional murders ===
On 22 July 1998, while Sovdat was undergoing a forensic psychiatric examination, the police announced that they had new murder suspicions against him. The police reviewed, among other cases:

- The murder of 25-year-old student Per Häggström at Swartlings Riding School on Valhallavägen 99, Stockholm, on 14 October 1996.
- The Murder of 46-year old Christina Olofsson, a receptionist at Wisby Hotel in Visby, on 12 December 1996.
- The murder of 61-year-old Jewish antique dealer Dan Barak on Frejgatan, Stockholm, on the night of 5–6 July 1995.
- The murder of 59-year-old teacher Åke Sterner at Hornsgatan 153 on Södermalm, Stockholm, on 1 September 1994. In this case, in May 2003, the then 28-year-old Nazi Dan Berner (later Lindberg) was sentenced to six years in prison for manslaughter.
- The Murder of 16-year old Anders Gustafsson in Norra Hammarbyhamnen, Stockholm, on the night of 31 December 1994 – 1 January 1995.

A common factor in several of these cases was extreme violence, sometimes directed at the victims' eyes—a so-called killer signature—indicating the same perpetrator. The police also suspected connections to brutal robberies and sexual offenses, including the rape of a 17-year-old girl in Tullinge.

On 21 July 1998, a special task force was formed with representatives from the Söderort Police, the City Police violent crimes unit, and the National Criminal Police's Investigation Department to analyze technical evidence and the offender profile. Psychiatrist Ulf Åsgård and a forensic pathologist participated, along with five police officers.

=== Further investigation ===
Sovdat was held in a secure forensic psychiatric unit in Gothenburg, where experts from the National Board of Forensic Medicine examined his actions and mental condition. The assessment included medical records, police investigations, social service reports, and school transcripts in order to determine whether he suffered from a severe mental disorder. Had that been the case, Sovdat would have faced compulsory forensic psychiatric care. His mother visited him and claimed that he appeared normal, despite having confessed to three murders. During the murder in Skarpnäck, Sovdat changed trousers with one of the victims after ejaculating in his own trousers, which, according to Detective Commissar Hans Strindlund, demonstrated awareness of his actions.

In mid-August 1998, Sovdat's six-week-long forensic psychiatric examination in Gothenburg was completed. The forensic psychiatrists concluded that Sovdat did not suffer from any mental illness and that, in the event of a conviction, the penalty would most likely be imprisonment. The police reported that Sovdat would probably be ruled out as a suspect in at least four of the eight murders he had been suspected of, including the murder on Valhallavägen, following technical analysis and voice analysis of a call to the emergency number SOS Alarm.

In mid-August 1998, it was reported that Sovdat would be charged in mid-September 1998 at the Stockholm District Court for the double murder in Skarpnäcks gård and the murder in Bagarmossen, which he had confessed to and in which bloody traces from the victims' homes had been linked to him through shoes and clothing. Other investigations, such as the murder of the receptionist in Visby and the older cases in Stockholm, were ongoing, but Sovdat was not considered a particularly likely perpetrator in these cases.

== Trial and verdict ==
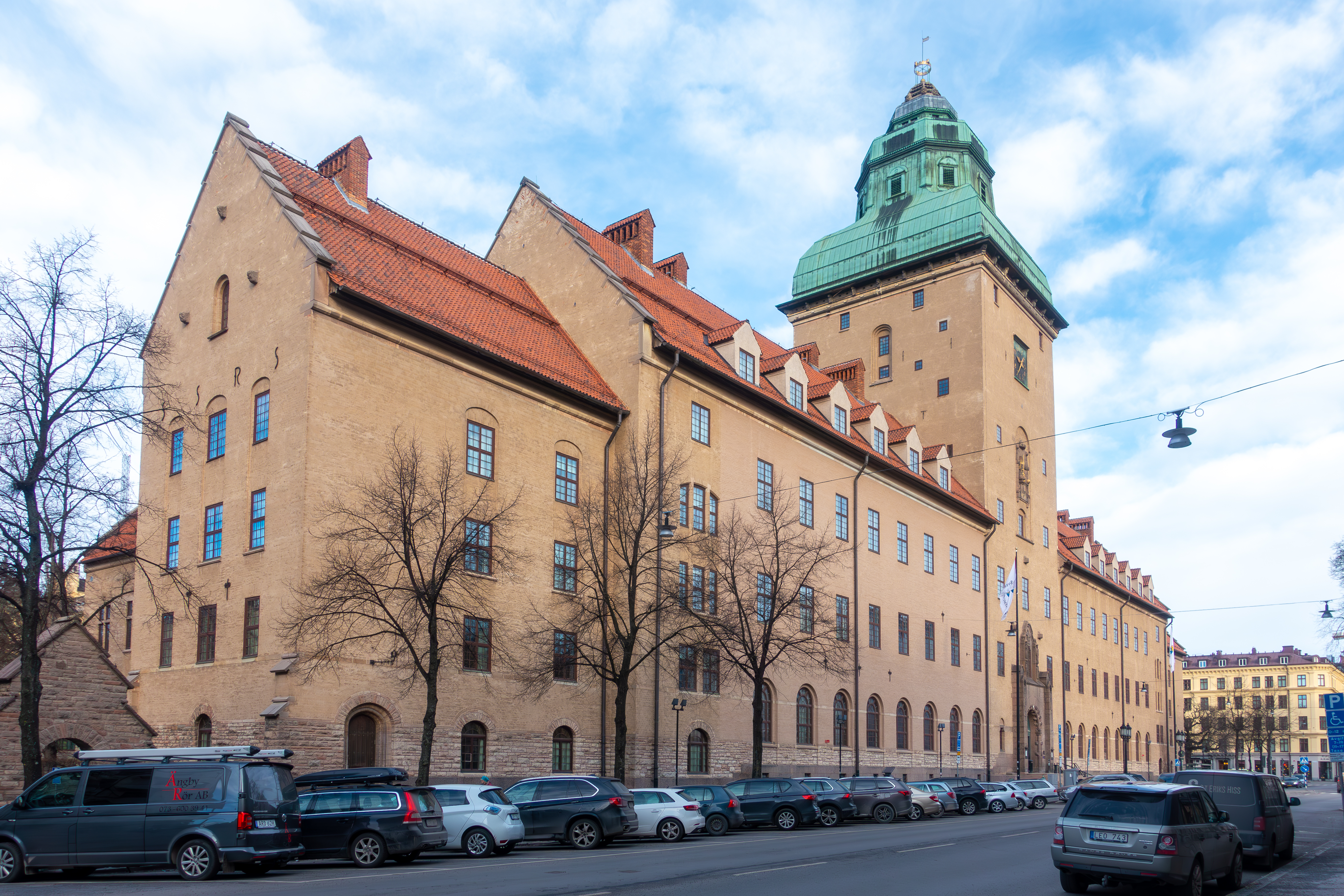
The trial was held at Stockholm District Court between October and December 1998.

On 7 October 1998, Sovdat was indicted on three counts of murder. He was also of interest in the continued investigation of an additional murder. After confessing to the crimes, Sovdat had provided an explanation that the police did not consider credible. Instead, investigators assessed the acts as pure lust murders. One circumstance that, according to the police, strengthened the suspicions against him was the icy coldness he displayed. As an example, they stated that after the murder of the elderly Karlsson, he had remained in Karlsson’s apartment watching television until nightfall, allowing him to leave the scene without being seen.

On the first day of the trial, 12 October 1998, Sovdat stated that Karlsson had offered him illicitly distilled alcohol in the apartment. According to Sovdat, Karlsson demanded sexual services as payment. Sovdat said that he then struck Karlsson in the face and subsequently used extremely excessive violence, something that also characterized the double murder in Skarpnäcks gård. In earlier police interrogations, Sovdat had said that he was under the influence of amphetamines at the time of Karlsson's murder, but he withdrew this statement before the court. He stated that he had been sober and explained that he had previously had difficulty recounting events without making excuses. Sovdat described how he covered Karlsson's body with furniture and debris and then remained in the apartment for five to six hours watching television while waiting for darkness to fall.

The police interrogations presented a contradictory picture of Sovdat. On the one hand, he had been in a steady relationship for nearly six years, had begun studies at the Stockholm Institute of Education, and was described as highly articulate. On the other hand, he had abused primarily Rohypnol in combination with alcohol, as well as cannabis, amphetamines, and LSD. He moved within rave circles and often frequented the techno club Docklands. Mental illness occurred within his family. A forensic psychiatric examination conducted in late summer showed that Sovdat did not suffer from any severe mental disorder. Sovdat subsequently requested that the Legal Council of the National Board of Health and Welfare (Socialstyrelsens rättsliga råd) issue an opinion, but no position had yet been taken. According to his defense attorney, Jan Karlsson, Sovdat preferred to be sentenced to psychiatric care rather than imprisonment.

The trial day of 14 October 1998 addressed the double murder. Sovdat stated that he had arrived at the apartment at approximately 05:00 to settle a business matter. According to him, David was not interested, whereupon Sovdat grabbed a knife from the kitchen to threaten him. Harriet then allegedly came out of the bedroom holding a hammer. Sovdat recalled stabbing David three times, but the autopsy showed that David had been subjected to nearly 50 stab wounds across his entire body. Sovdat further stated that he took the hammer from Harriet and struck her on the head, but she too had sustained far more injuries than that. He suspected that he had been under the influence of amphetamines and Rohypnol and stated that he therefore had memory gaps. For example, he could not explain how the bodies ended up in the bathroom, even though the murders had not been committed there. He described the experience as seeing everything through a dark red lens and stated that he did not recall any sounds.

On 14 October 1998, the National Board of Health and Welfare decided that its Scientific Council would meet with Sovdat to assess his mental condition, preliminarily in late November 1998. Only thereafter would the district court proceedings be concluded and a verdict delivered. When Sovdat recounted his version of the murders, he showed no emotion. When he described pulling a knife out of Harriet's eye, his voice did not tremble. He said that the couple had been decent and pleasant and that he had liked them, but that he could not understand how everything had developed in this way. In police interrogations, Sovdat had claimed that he had not felt any sexual desire in connection with the killings, despite semen having been found in his bloodstained trousers left in the apartment. David's and Harriet's families demanded financial compensation from Sovdat and that he pay for the couple's funerals. Among those seeking damages were several children who were half-siblings and step-siblings of the victims. The families had suffered greatly after the murders, and on the Tuesday an immediate family member had been admitted for treatment at a psychiatric clinic.

On 12 December 1998, it was reported that Sovdat suffered from a very severe mental disorder and was in need of care for a very long time. This was the conclusion of an opinion submitted to the district court by the Legal Council of the National Board of Health and Welfare. The opinion meant that Sovdat could not be sentenced to imprisonment and that the only possible sanction was forensic psychiatric care with special discharge review. Psychiatrist Gunnar Kullgren, who had examined Sovdat, assessed that there was a high risk that he could commit similar acts if at liberty. The care therefore had to be combined with special discharge review. According to Kullgren, at the time of the offenses Sovdat had been in a state in which he lacked the ability to control his actions, meaning that he suffered from a severe mental disorder in the legal sense and therefore could not be sentenced to prison. The first forensic psychiatric examination, conducted in Gothenburg, had reached the opposite conclusion and found that Sovdat was not severely mentally disordered. The closing arguments in the case were record-short, as there was only one possible sanction.

On 18 December 1998, Sovdat was convicted of murder, drug offenses, and violations of the knife act and sentenced to institutional psychiatric care with special discharge review. The special discharge review meant that it was the administrative court that would decide when Sovdat was considered sufficiently recovered to be released. In this assessment, his treating physician participated and, in cases of such serious criminality as this, the prosecutor as well. The most recent forensic psychiatric assessment was carried out by Gunnar Kullgren, who stated in his opinion to the Stockholm District Court that Sovdat would be in need of care for a very long time.

== Aftermath ==
=== Judgment, treatment, and gradual release ===
On 18 December 1998, Sovdat was sentenced by the Stockholm District Court to institutional psychiatric care with special discharge review for three murders. The judgment emphasized the extreme seriousness of the crimes and the significant risk of reoffending. Professor of forensic psychiatry Gunnar Kullgren stated that "it perhaps hardly needs to be pointed out that the 28-year-old will require a very long period of treatment." The court also noted that the mental disorder was of such a nature that the risk of renewed serious violent criminality could not be ruled out.

On 4 February 1999, Sovdat was transferred to Karsudden Hospital outside Katrineholm. Despite the clear wording of the judgment, a gradual release process began after just over one year. In 2000, he was granted his first ground privileges (frigång), and thereafter the number of temporary leaves increased continuously. Between 2000 and 2003, he was granted a total of 42 leaves and temporary ground privileges. (Note: The full list of leaves can be found here:) In 2000, he was granted nine; in 2001, thirteen; in 2002, fifteen; and during the first half of 2003, an additional five. From autumn 2002, he was able to spend up to approximately 60 hours per week outside the hospital and also had recurring weekend leaves. He participated in trips, including to Poland and to the Swedish mountain regions.

The leaves were decided by the County Administrative Court of Appeal in Södermanland County following applications submitted by Sovdat himself. The chief physician at Karsudden Hospital, Kent Persson, as well as a prosecutor, issued opinions in the matters before the court made its decisions. A recurring justification was that Sovdat was considered stable within the treatment environment and that he had formally complied with the conditions of his leaves, which gradually formed the basis for increasingly long and extensive freedoms.

=== Studies, internship, and growing criticism ===
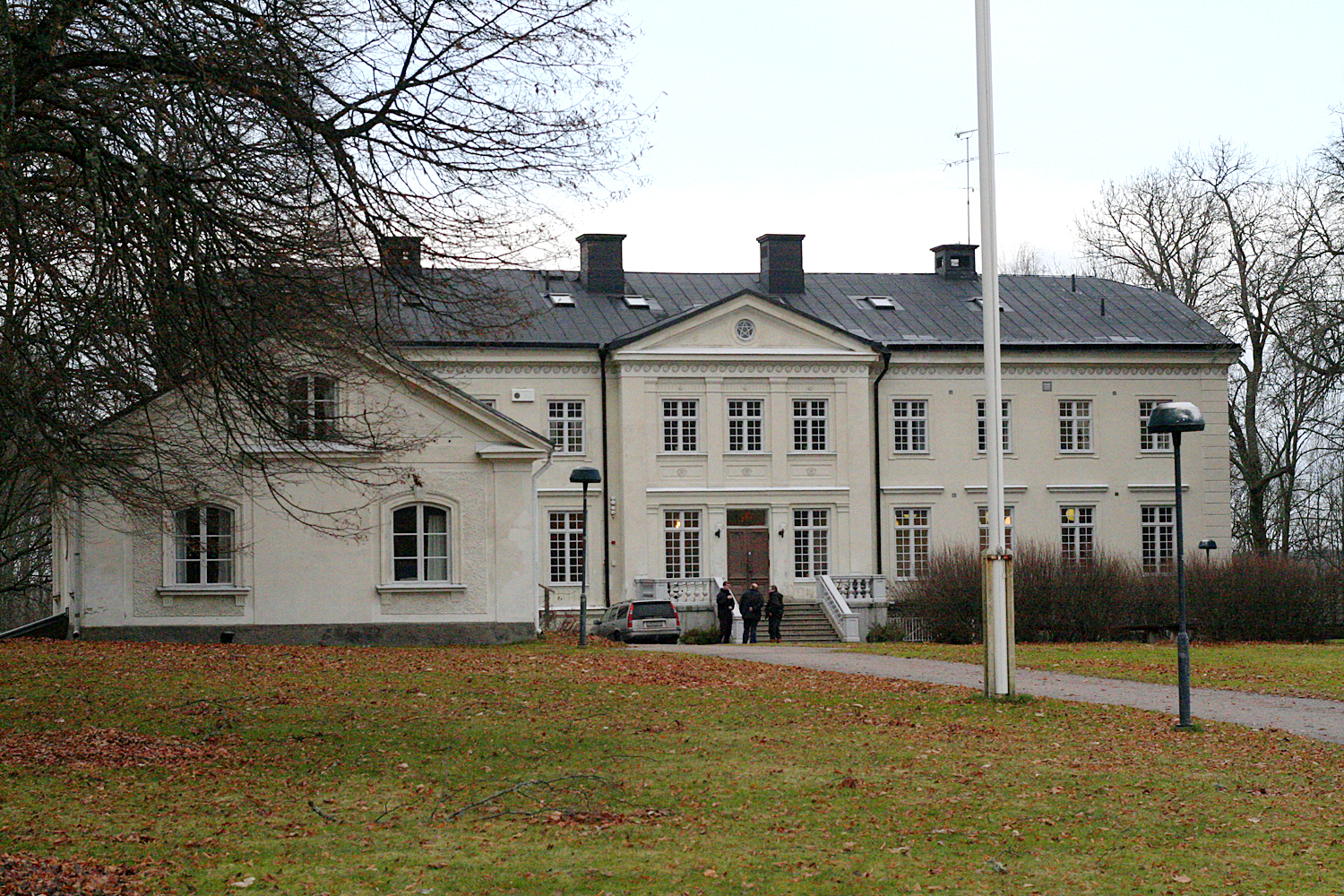
Kjesäters folkhögskola, where Sovdat studied to become a youth recreation leader four years after the murders.

As part of his treatment planning, Sovdat was granted leave for studies. From 2002, he studied to become a youth recreation leader at Kjesäters Folkhögskola in Södermanland. During the spring of 2003, he completed an internship at the Djäknepark youth center (Djäkneparks fritidsgård, Ungkan) in Norrköping. Neither the school management, staff, students, nor parents were informed that the intern had been convicted of three murders. The principal, Magnus Måhl, later stated that Karsudden Hospital had only informed them that Sovdat had been convicted of a serious violent offense. When the full background became known through the media, the school stated that the admission decision had been made on incorrect grounds.

The case exposed a gap in the legislation: interns within schools and youth recreation services were not subject to mandatory criminal record checks. This was criticized by both the National Agency for Education and the Swedish Association of Local Authorities (Svenska Kommunförbundet), who argued that responsibility was unclear and that the system did not sufficiently take children's safety into account.

At the same time, relatives of the murder victims began to learn about the extent of Sovdat's leaves. In May 2003, it was revealed that he had been alone at a pub in Katrineholm. Harriet's older sister and David’s mother stated that they had lived under the belief that he was continuously confined and that they had not been informed, despite having requested after the verdict to be notified of every leave. The discovery was described as a shock and a betrayal.

David's father, Bengt Eklund, became one of the most outspoken critics. He repeatedly directed sharp criticism at Karsudden Hospital, its chief physician Kent Persson, prosecutors, and the County Administrative Court of Södermanland. According to him, the seriousness of the crimes had been reduced to a formality in a system where the perpetrator's needs were given greater weight than the victims' sense of safety. Relatives openly questioned who would bear responsibility should Sovdat reoffend in violent crime.

=== Police warnings and the authorities' defense ===
Detective Commissar Hans Strindlund, who led the murder investigation, repeatedly expressed strong concern. He described Sovdat as the most dangerous offender he had encountered during his career and as extremely manipulative, articulate, and difficult to see through. Strindlund believed that Sovdat derived sexual gratification from the violence involved in the crimes and that the level of excessive violence was exceptional. He criticized the way forensic psychiatry assessed dangerousness, pointing out that such evaluations were conducted in a controlled environment without drugs, despite Sovdat's documented abuse of substances including Rohypnol, amphetamines, and cannabis.

Strindlund called for legislative changes, arguing that individuals assessed as extremely dangerous should not be eligible for release from forensic psychiatric care but should instead serve the remainder of their time in prison if they were deemed "healthy." His criticism was shared by several police officers involved in the investigation, who described the situation as irresponsible and dangerous.

From the perspective of forensic psychiatry and the courts, however, the focus was placed on treatment. Chief physician Kent Persson emphasized that forensic psychiatric care is not a punishment and that leave is a normal part of treatment. The County Administrative Court of Södermanland referred to the fact that neither the chief physician nor the prosecutor had generally raised objections to the leaves. Critics, however, argued that this created a closed system in which responsibility was shifted between actors without meaningful external oversight.

=== Incidents, Parliamentary Ombudsman complaints, and continued leave ===
During the summer of 2003, Bengt Eklund filed complaints with the Parliamentary Ombudsman (JO) against Karsudden Hospital and the County Administrative Court of Södermanland. The cases were forwarded to, among others, the National Board of Health and Welfare, but did not result in any clear consequences. Criticism from relatives and police continued, even as Sovdat was granted progressively longer leaves.

On 31 August 2005, a serious incident occurred during a leave. Sovdat, with a blood alcohol level of over 0.2% and under the influence of benzodiazepines, drove into a pole. He also threatened a security guard with death. Despite the severity of the incident, the prosecutor Moa Skerfving dropped the case, reasoning that he was already subject to compulsory forensic psychiatric care. His driver's license was not revoked. For the relatives, this became a clear example of a system lacking consequences even in the face of obvious misconduct.

In January 2006, Sovdat was granted a two-month leave and moved into his own residence outside Stockholm. According to chief physician Kent Persson, he was considered to be in sufficiently good mental health for this, under continued supervision with regular drug testing. The aim was for the leave to transition into a permanent arrangement.

For the victims' relatives, this represented the culmination of a long-standing crisis of confidence. They described a life marked by fear and the experience that the legal system and forensic psychiatric care had failed to adequately account for the severity of the crimes and the perspective of the victims. Several reported that they had relocated or lived in hiding and that they had completely lost faith in the authorities' ability to protect the public.

== Victims ==
- Henry Karlsson (9 January 1922 – 26 July 1996 (Note: 26 July 1996 is the official date of death. It was the date he was found dead in his apartment. At the time, the police suspected that Karlsson had been dead for an extended period. Later that same year, the police concluded that the murder had actually taken place on 18 July.)). He was buried on 28 August 1996 in the memorial grove at Skogskyrkogården in Stockholm.
- Rut Harriet Illerström (15 April 1977 – 1 May 1998). The funeral ceremony was held on 28 May 1998 at Hammarby Church in southern Stockholm. She was buried on 30 June 1998 at Sandsborgskyrkogården in Stockholm.
- Carl David Eklund (17 December 1975 – 1 May 1998). He was buried on 30 June 1998 at Sandsborgskyrkogården in Stockholm.

== In the media ==
On 29 August 1996, the murder of Henry Karlsson was featured on TV3 reality legal program Efterlyst.

On 26 January 2006, the murders of Harriet Illerström and David Eklund was featured on TV3 reality legal program Efterlyst.

On 21 November 2006, the case was revisited in episode 3 of the TV3 documentary Ondska.

On 7 October 2022, the case was revisited in an episode of the podcast Svenska Mordhistorier.

On 25 October 2023, the case was revisited in an episode of the podcast Spotify Dok.

== See also ==
- Roger Karlsson – triple murderer released after two years
- Sten Fransson – triple murderer released after nine months
