= Skarpnäcksfältet =

- Subdistrict of Stockholm
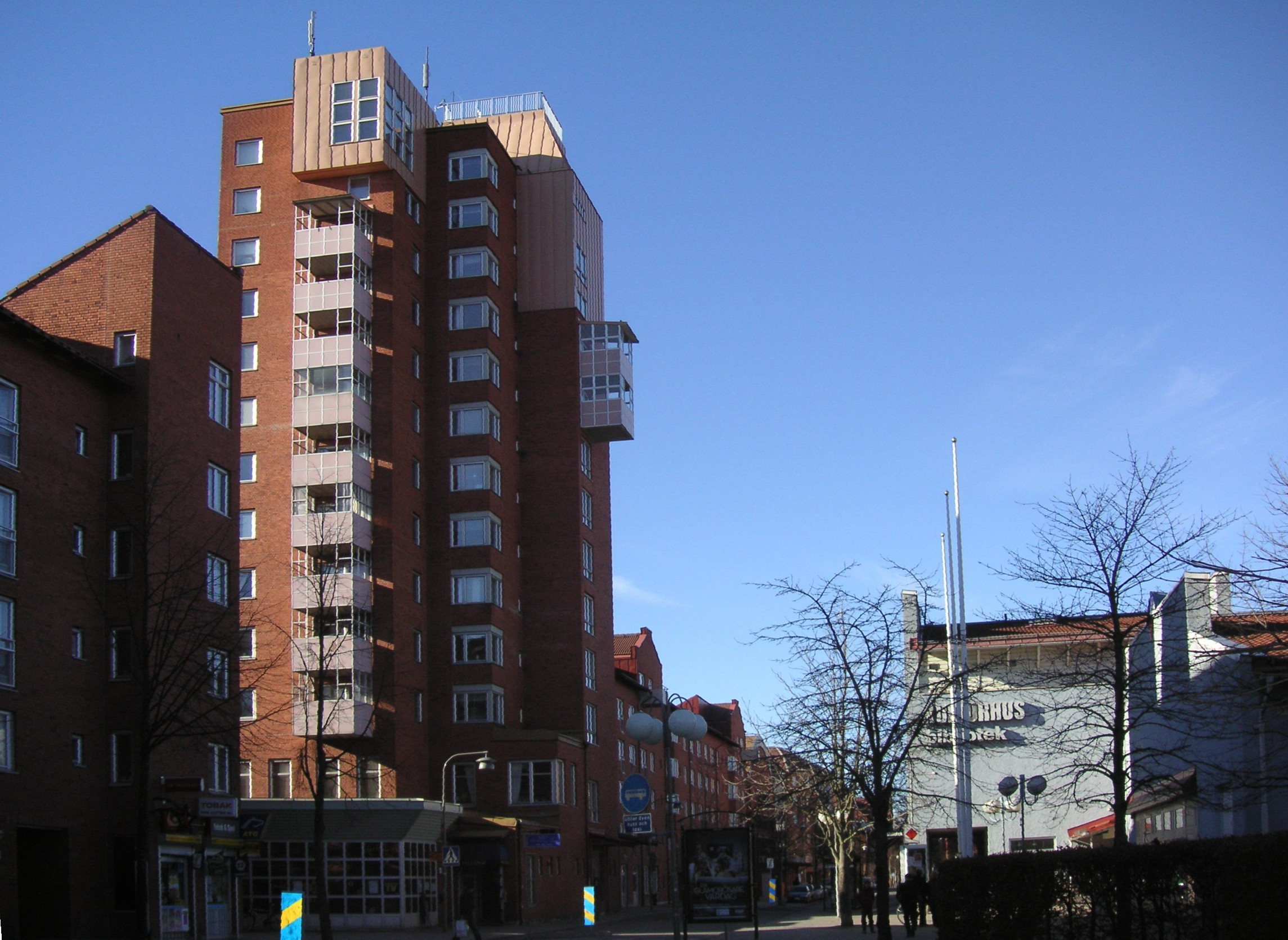
- Skarpnäcks Allé

- Location of Skarpnäcksfältet in Stockholm Municipality
- Coordinates: 59°16′4.28″N 18°7′6.65″E
- Country: Sweden
- Province: Södermanland
- County: Stockholm County
- Municipality: Stockholm Municipality
- Borough: Skarpnäck borough
- District: Skarpnäcks gård

Population (December 31, 2009)
  - Total: 8,734

Skarpnäcksfältet (English: The Skarpnäck Field) is a subdistrict of Skarpnäcks Gård in the Skarpnäck borough of Stockholm, Sweden. Skarpnäcksfältet was built in the 1980s, and has 8,734 inhabitants as of December 31, 2009.

== History ==
Archaeological findings, such as a hill fort and stone circles near Flatensjön, indicate that Skarpnäcksfältet and nearby areas were populated by vikings as early as the 10th century.

=== Skarpa by ===
Skarpa, a cottage of the Årsta property, was first mentioned in the will of Duke Valdemar in 1318, where it was listed as one of his donations to Uppsala domkyrka. Skarpa derives from the word skarp (English: sharp), and is believed to have indicated the soil quality, which was heavy loam. It is believed that the small village of Skarpa by, with the Skarpa cottage, also consisted of three homesteads dating as far back as the 13th century.

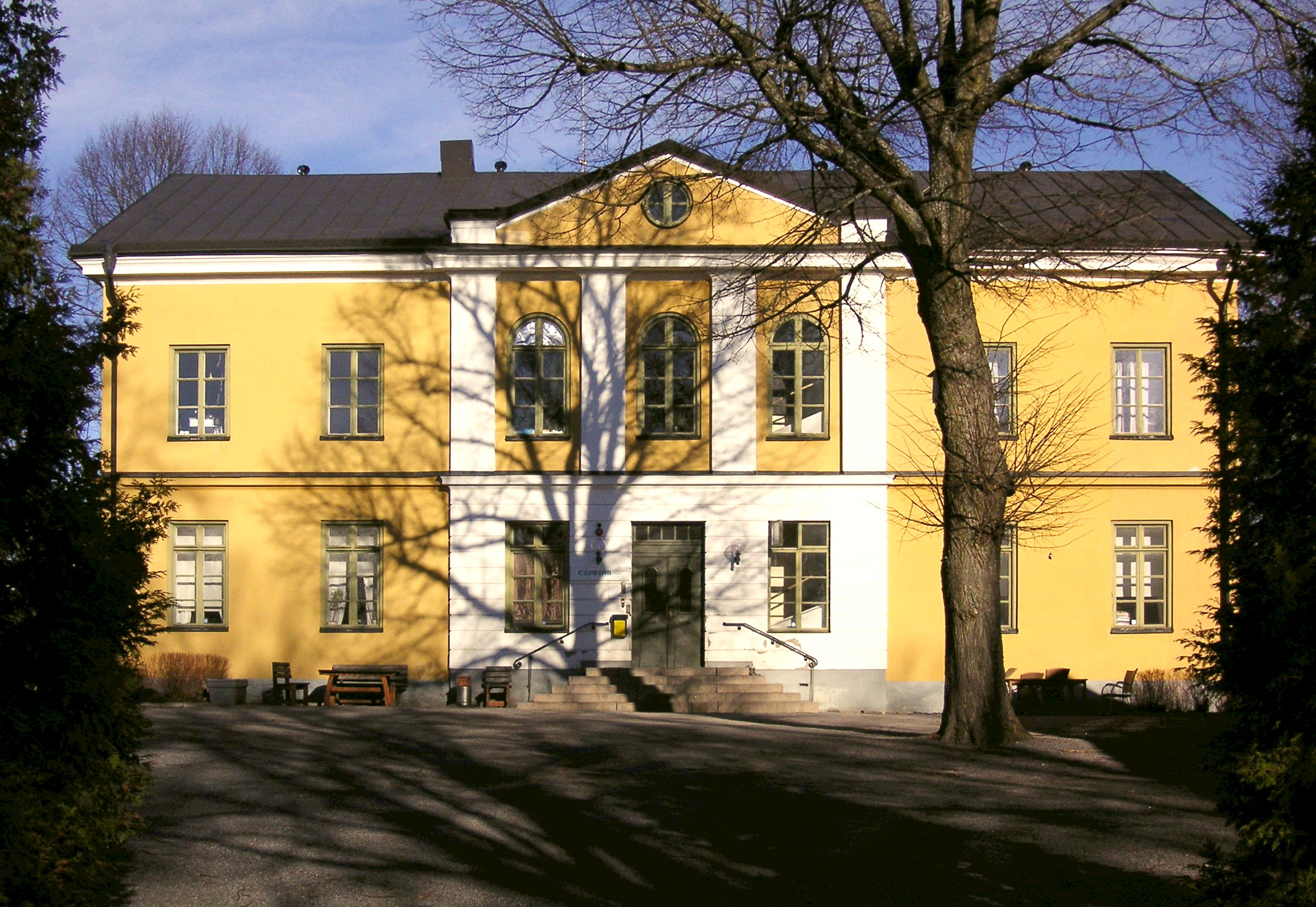
The main building of Skarpnäcks gård, as constructed in the 1860s.

According to a document from 1432, Skarpa was sold by the Archdiocese of Uppsala to Hans Kröpelin, the chieftain of Eric of Pomerania, who was the King of Sweden at the time. Like in the will of Duke Valdemar, Skarpa was part of the Årsta property.

During the 17th century, the land and cottages of Skarpa by were included in the Tyresö property. Tyresö was owned by the Oxenstierna family, which constructed a mansion in Skarpa by. A countess of the family (Maria Sofia de la Gardie) made Skarpa a manor (Swedish: säteri) which she named Skarpnäck. The manor continued to grow in the 18th century, now housing workers and farmers. The manor switched owners a few times, and in the beginning of the 19th century, there were almost 30 buildings in Skarpnäcks gård. The last owner, Friedrich Neumüller, constructed the main building which still exists today, roughly 150 years later. Eventually, in 1922, the property was sold to the Stockholm Municipality.

=== Skarpnäck Airfield ===
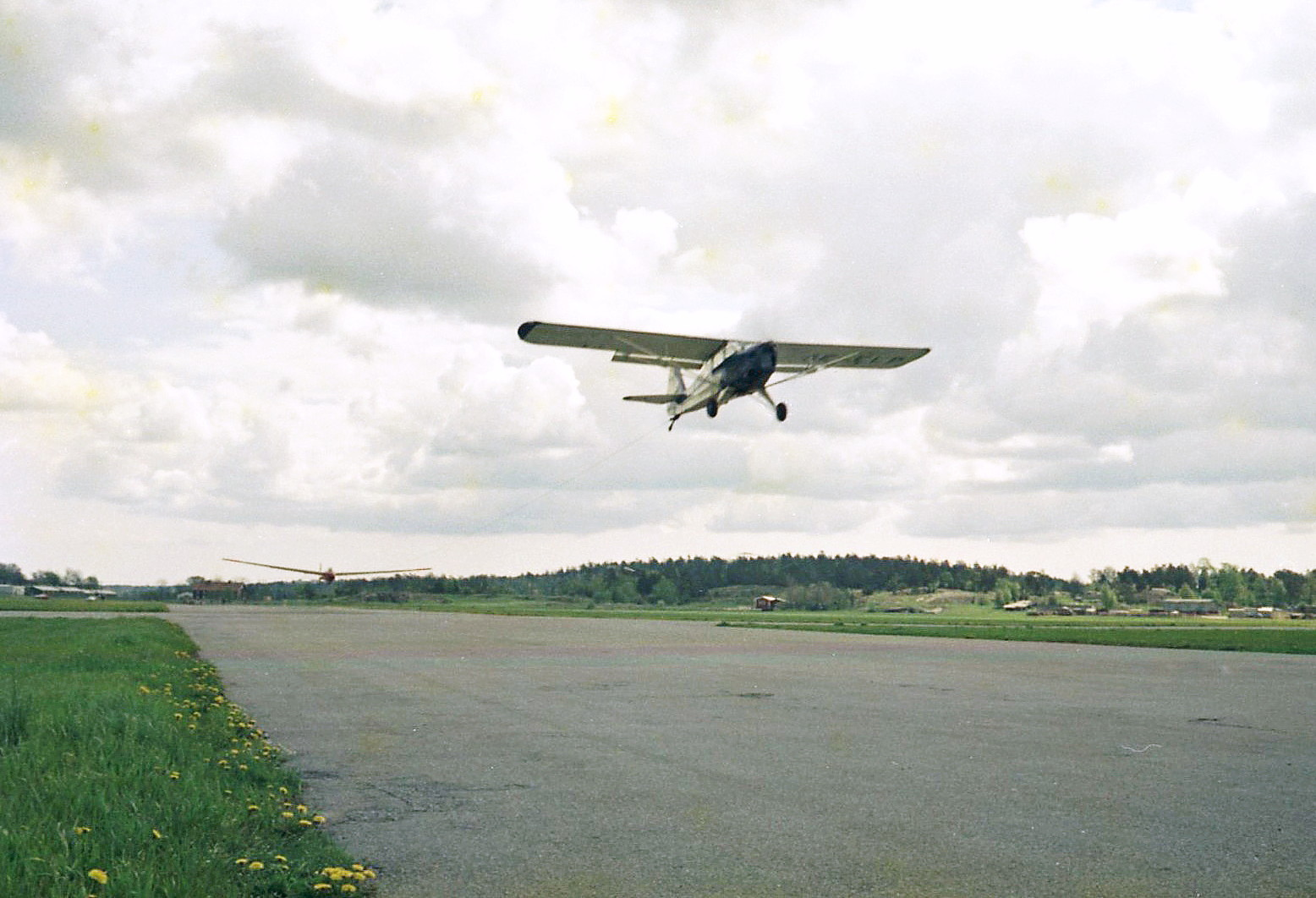
Sailplane at Skarpnäck in 1972.

The Skarpnäck Airfield was constructed on Skarpnäcksfältet around 1940. Originally intended to be a reserve airfield for the military, those plans were soon abandoned, and in 1943, Stockholms Segelflygklubb (English: Stockholm's Sailplane Association) moved its operations to the airfield. The airfield was commonly used for other activities, including balloon flying, races such as the 1948 Stockholm Grand Prix, baseball and greyhound racing.

The airfield became a centre for alternative society movements. In August 1950, the International Union of Socialist Youth, together with the Swedish Social Democratic Youth Association, organized a week-long international tent camp, in which Tage Erlander (prime minister of Sweden), participated. During the United Nations environmental conference in 1972, which took place in Stockholm, thousands of hippies, environmental activists and leftist activists gathered in a large tent camp at Skarpnäck Airfield, organized mostly by the Hog Farm and other Woodstock veterans. This also became a large musical event, with progressive artists like Peps Persson, Kebnekajse, Blå Tåget and Träd, Gräs & Stenar playing.

With the initiative of Motorförarnas Helnykterhetsförbund, a temperance organization, Sweden's first drive-in church service was held at Skarpnäck Airfield on May 30, 1957. Bishop Odd Hagen of the Methodist church spoke in front of 1,000 cars, and altogether around 6,000 people. The altar was placed on a lorry platform.

In September 1980, the Stockholm Municipality decided that a large residential area called Skarpnäcksstaden (English: The Skarpnäck City) would be constructed on the airfield. The baseball and greyhound-racing facilities remained and were included in the new residential area, but the greyhound-racing was closed in 2006 in favour of a football field of artificial turf.

== Geography ==
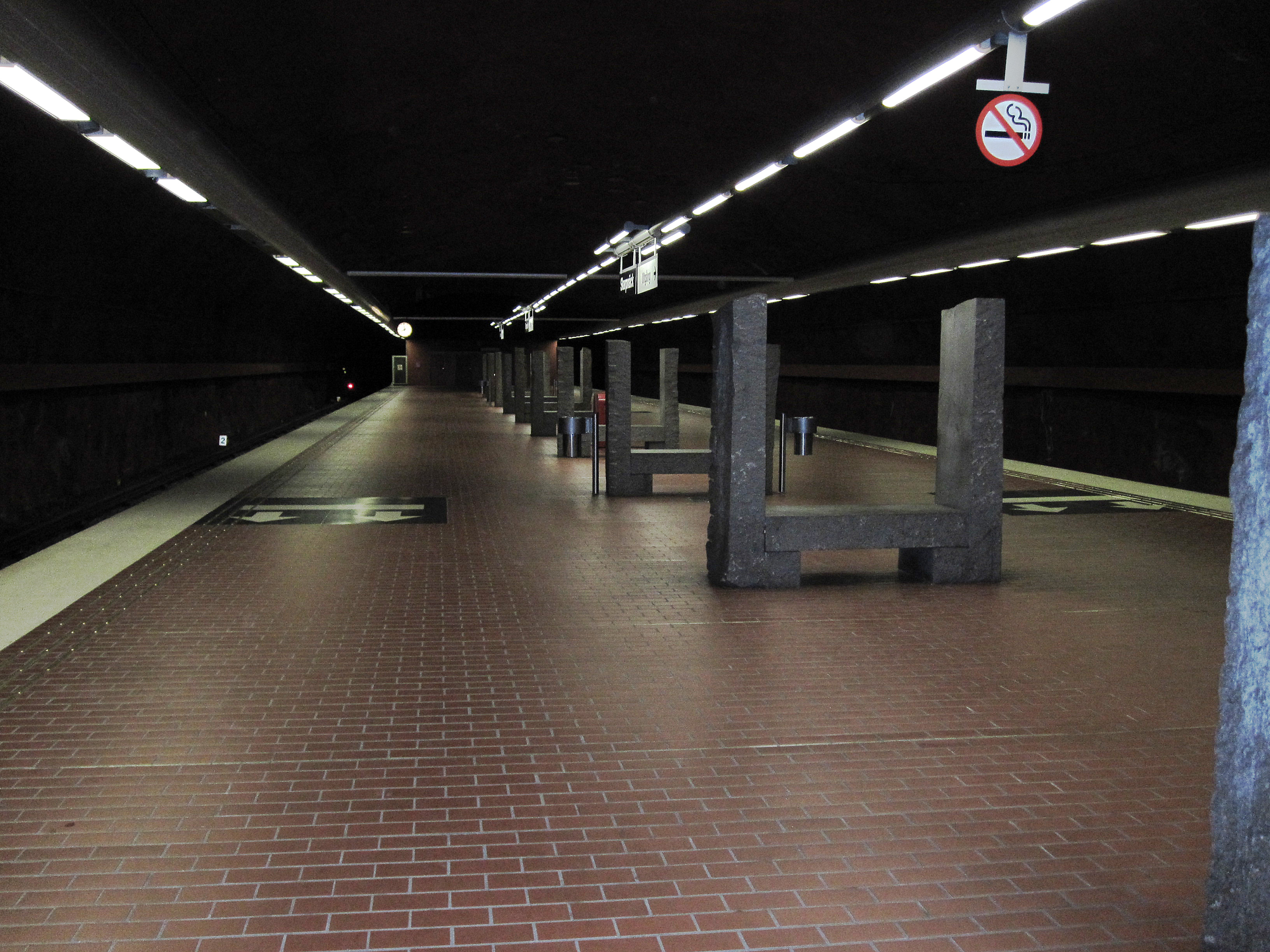
Skarpnäck metro station.

Skarpnäcksfältet is a subdistrict of Skarpnäcks gård in the Skarpnäck borough. However, since the area's construction in the 1980s, the police and Stockholm Municipality publish their statistics for Skarpnäcks gård separately between Skarpnäcksfältet and Pungpinan (the two subdistricts). Skarpnäcksfältet accounts for the majority of the Skarpnäcks gård district's population, and is colloquially referred to as Skarpnäck. Skarpnäcksfältet is served by a metro station named Skarpnäck, contributing to the name confusion.

Skarpnäcksfältet neighbours Flaten to the southeast, Orhem to the south, Sköndal in the Farsta borough to the southwest, Pungpinan to the northwest, Bagarmossen to the north, and the nature reserve Nackareservatet in Nacka Municipality to the east.

=== Transportation ===
The Skarpnäck metro station is located below ground, and has one entrance on Skarpnäcks Allé. The original plan was to have two entrances, the other one located south of the current one, but those plans were never carried out. Skarpnäck metro station opened in 1994, making it the 100th and newest station of the Stockholm Metro. Skarpnäck is the terminus of the Green Line (Line 17), a role it took from Bagarmossen in 1994. A number of buses also pass through Skarpnäcksfältet – 180 between Kärrtorp and Orhem, 811 between Gullmarsplan and Älta and 816 between Gullmarsplan and Tyresö Centrum. 181 to Farsta strand, 172 to Norsborg and 173 to Skärholmen all have their terminus on Skarpnäcksfältet.

== Architecture ==
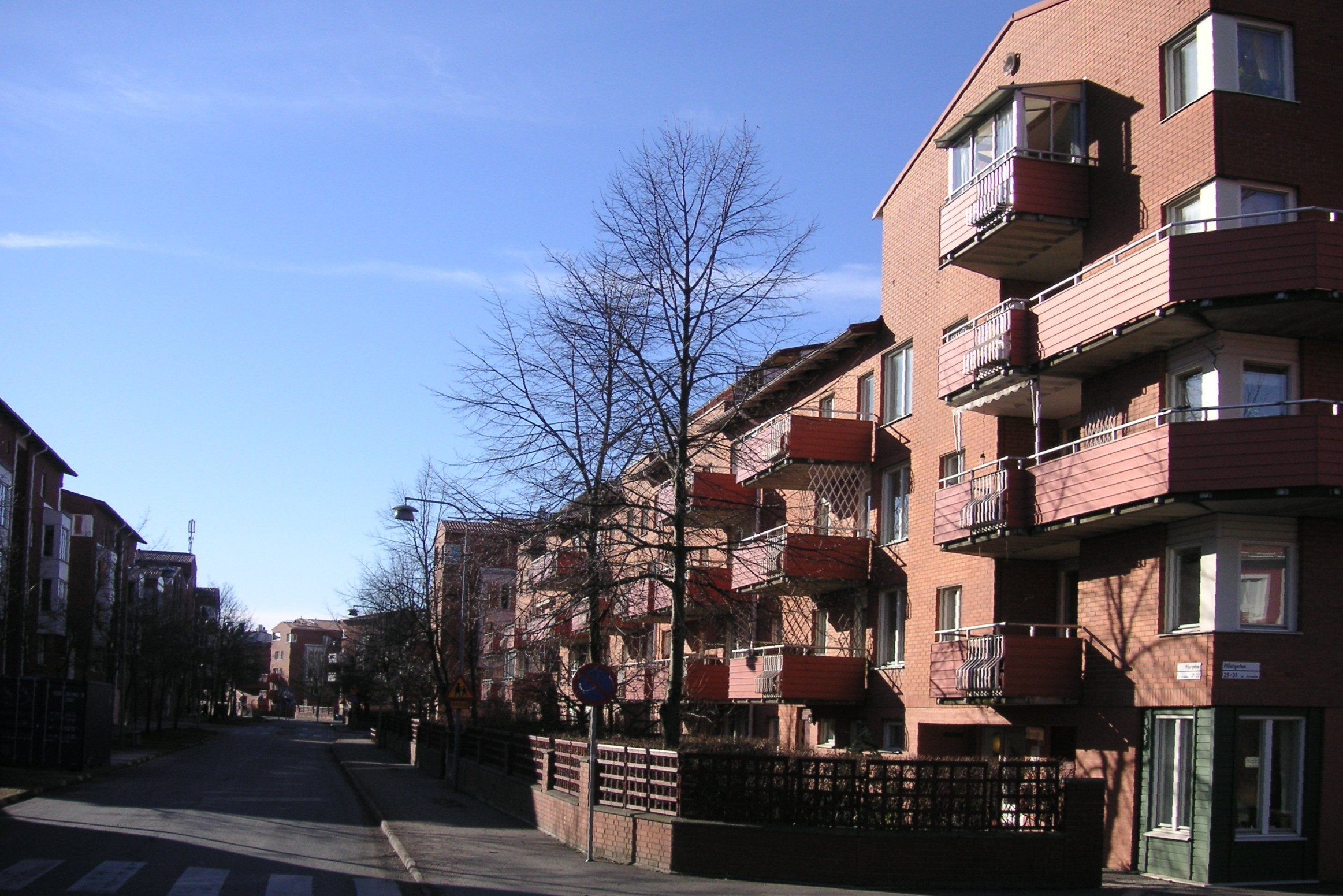
Pilotgatan, Skarpnäcksfältet.

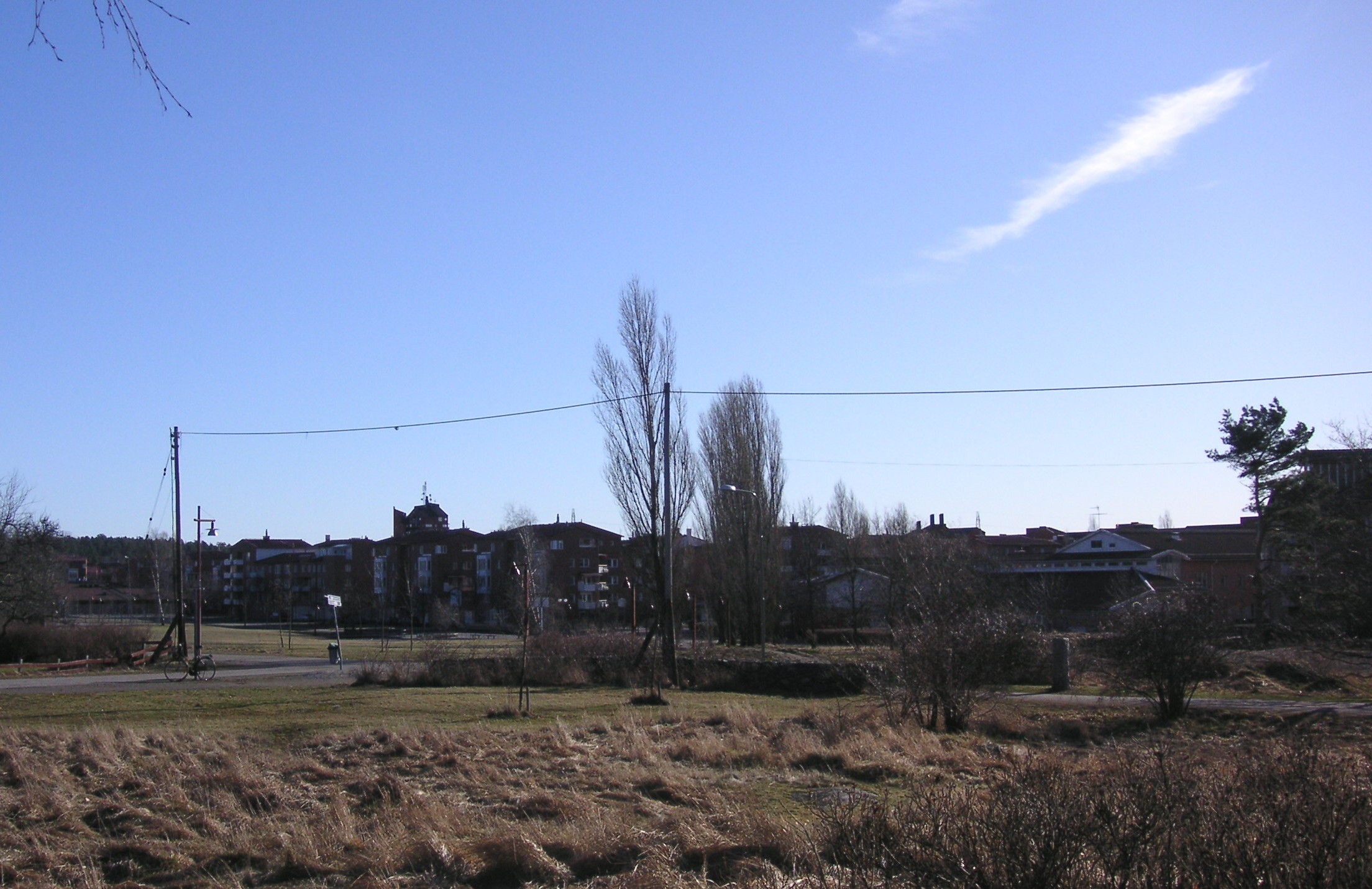
View of northern Skarpnäcksfältet from the Bagarmossen side.

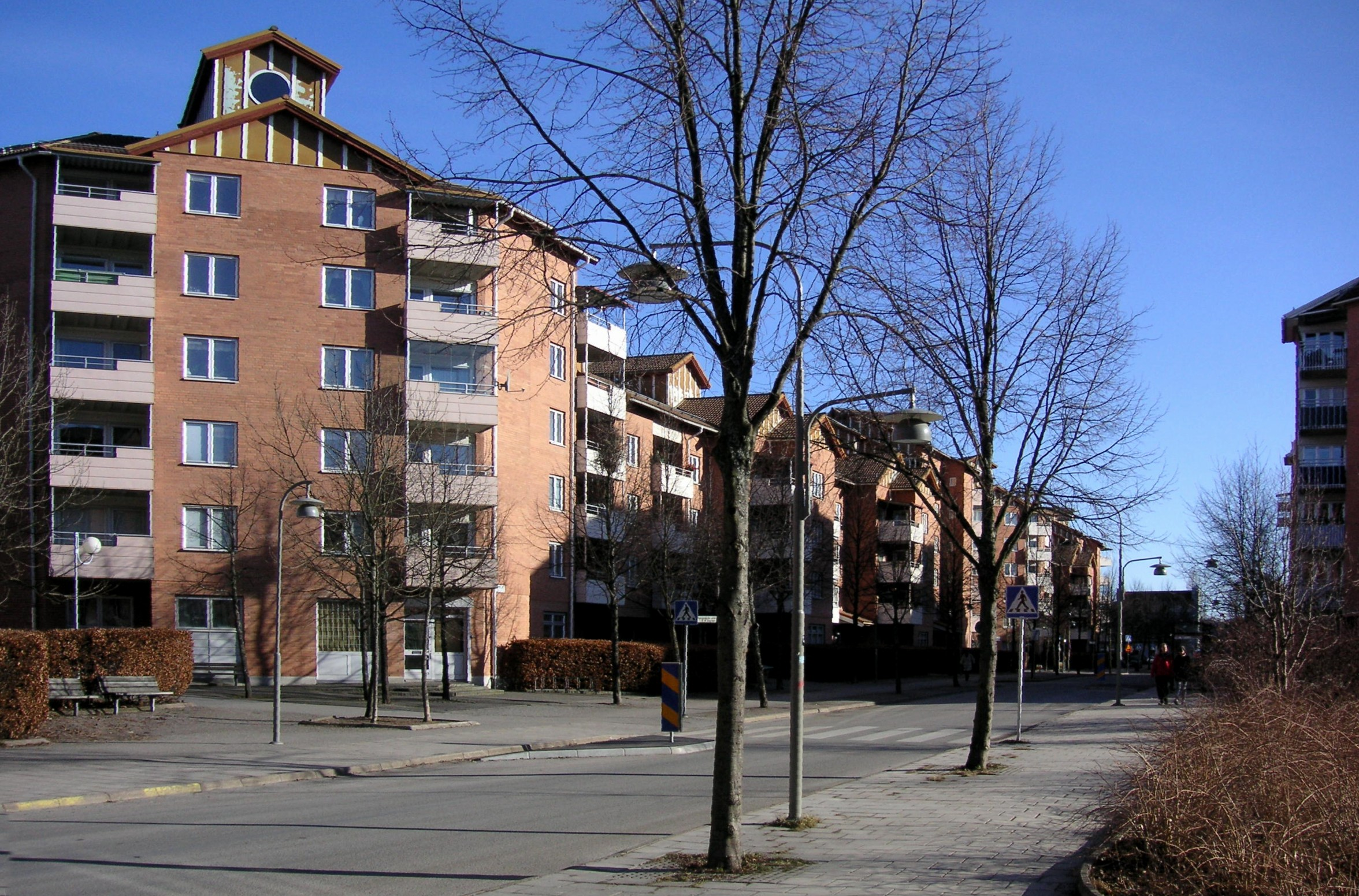
Skarpnäcks Allé, Skarpnäcksfältet.

The construction of Skarpnäcksstaden began in the early 1980s. This was a few years after the finish of the Million Programme, a project designed to offer everyone a reasonably priced home by building one million dwellings in a 10-year period, 1965 to 1974. While the project succeeded, it was heavily criticized for the buildings' lack of aesthetics, the common image of a Million Programme building being a large, gray apartment complex of cement in a monotone dormitory suburb.

Thus, with the planning of Skarpnäcksstaden, time was spent to assure that the mistakes of the Million Programme were not repeated. The area was to move away from the mass production-style of the Million Programme, instead focusing on a variation of houses and apartments. Skarpnäcksstaden was intended to be a complete small town in itself, with housing, workplaces and schools. In all, the classical elements of a small town inspired the design of Skarpnäcksfältet greatly, for instance in the structure of blocks with streets, squares and courtyards.

The characteristical orange-red brick buildings of Skarpnäcksfältet have received international attention, partially because the relatively large area consists of exclusively such buildings. Other than the apartment buildings, a number of row-houses and an industrial area were built around the same time, painted in similar colours to fit with the rest of Skarpnäcksfältet. The design, by architect Leif Blomquist, has received several awards for its extraordinarity. Skarpnäcksfältet has considerably few connections with other districts, giving it the image of a slightly isolated area, and some argue that a road to Bagarmossen with new housing developments would lead to a better integration of Skarpnäcksfältet, while others think that the nature between the two areas should be preserved.

== Housing ==
Between 1982 and 1990, 3,390 apartments were built on Skarpnäcksfältet. On December 31, 1990, 1,419 of those were publicly owned rental apartments, 736 were privately owned rental apartments and 1,235 were condominiums. As of December 31, 2009, there are 3,564 apartments on Skarpnäcksfältet - 1,323 publicly owned rental apartments, 194 privately owned rental apartments and 2,047 condominiums. There are also 277 other dwellings, mostly row-houses.

As of December 31, 2009, there are 332 studio apartments, 1,155 two-room apartments, 1,199 three-room apartments, 816 four-room apartments and 150 five-room apartments. Most of the other 277 dwellings have four or five rooms. Given that there were many big apartments on Skarpnäcksfältet, plenty of families with children moved there, which lead to Skarpnäcksfältet having the highest child density (highest number of children per square km) in northern Europe during the mid-90s.

== Demographics ==
Skarpnäcksfältet has 8,734 inhabitants as of December 31, 2009. People with a foreign background (born outside Sweden, or with both parents born outside Sweden) made up for 42.8% of Skarpnäcksfältet's population, compared to 26.6% of the entire Skarpnäck borough, and 28.7% of Stockholm as a whole.

The unemployment rate of Skarpnäcksfältet was 4.8% on October 31, 2009. In comparison, 3.8% of the Skarpnäck borough population were unemployed, and 3.6% of Stockholm as a whole. The average income on Skarpnäcksfältet was 227,000 Swedish kronor, this was below the Skarpnäck borough average of 250,200 Swedish kronor as well as the Stockholm average of 294,500 Swedish kronor.

== See also ==
- Skarpnäck
- Skarpnäcks gård
- Skarpnäck metro station
