= 1952 Skarpnäcksloppet =

- Non-championship race in the 1952 Formula One season
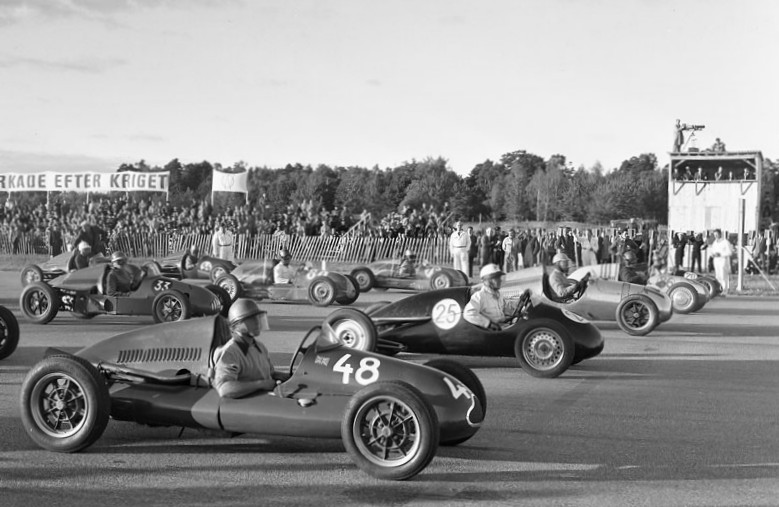

Race details
- Date: 14 September 1952
- Official name: II Skarpnäcksloppet
- Location: Skarpnäck, Stockholm, Sweden
- Course: Skarpnäck Airfield
- Course length: 1.70 km (1.06 miles)
- Distance: 25 laps, 42.51 km (26.50 miles)

Podium
First	(Sweden) Gunnar Carlsson	Mercury Special
Second	(Sweden) Erik Lundgren	Ockelbo Special
Third	(Norway) Carl Stausland	Ford Special

The II Skarpnäcksloppet was a non-championship Formula One motor race held at Skarpnäck Airfield, Skarpnäck, Stockholm on 14 September 1952. The race was won by Gunnar Carlsson in a Mercury Special.

== Results ==
Pos	Driver	Car	Time/Retired
1	(Sweden) Gunnar Carlsson	Mercury Special	26:49.4
2	(Sweden) Erik Lundgren	Ockelbo Special	+2.4s
3	(Norway) Carl Stausland	Ford Special	+4.4s
4	(Sweden) Valdemar Stener	Ferrari 166MM	+54.5s
5	(Sweden) Ake Jonsson	BJS-Volvo	+55.3s
6	(Sweden) Eric Carlsson	Ford Special	+58.3s
7	(Sweden) Lars-Emil Bergstrom	Buick Special	24 laps
8	(Sweden) Ola By	Ford Special	24 laps
9	(Sweden) John Kvarnstrom	Hudson Special	24 laps
10	(Sweden) Gosta Kvarnstrom	Ford Special	23 laps

Previous race: 1952 Circuit de Cadours	Formula One non-championship races 1952 season	Next race: 1952 Modena Grand Prix
Previous race: 1951 Skarpnäcksloppet	Skarpnäcksloppet	Next race: 1953 Skarpnäcksloppet
