= Bagarmossen =

- District of Stockholm
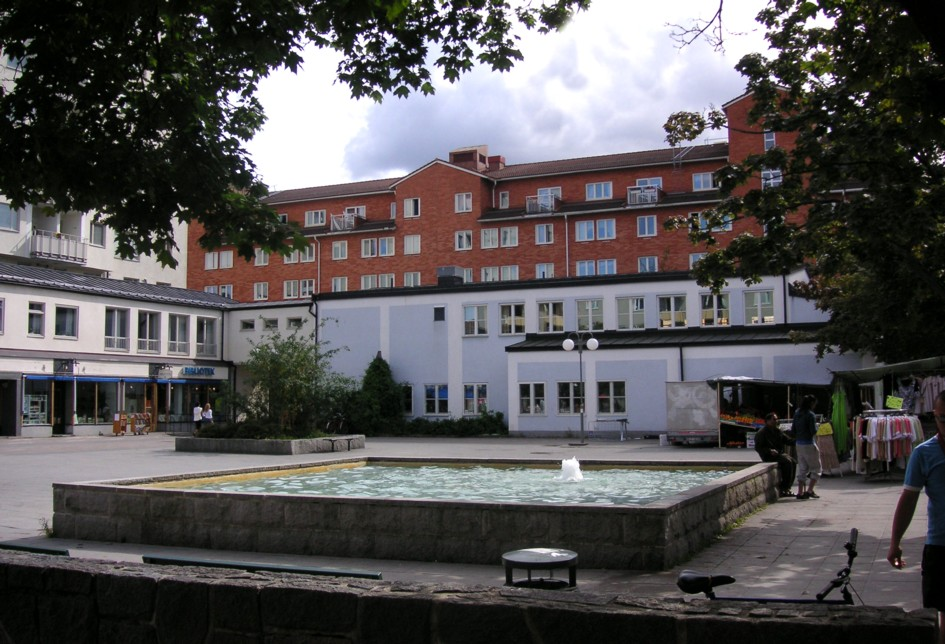
- Lagaplan, Bagarmossen

- Location of Bagarmossen in Stockholm Municipality
- Coordinates: 59°16′37″N 18°7′55″E
- Country: Sweden
- Province: Södermanland
- County: Stockholm County
- Municipality: Stockholm Municipality
- Borough: Skarpnäck borough
- Founded: 1963

Area
  - Total: 1.98 km^{2} (0.76 sq mi)
  - Land: 1.98 km^{2} (0.76 sq mi)
  - Water: 0.00 km^{2} (0 sq mi) 0.0%

Population (December 31, 2009)
  - Total: 10,915
  - Density: 5,510/km^{2} (14,300/sq mi)

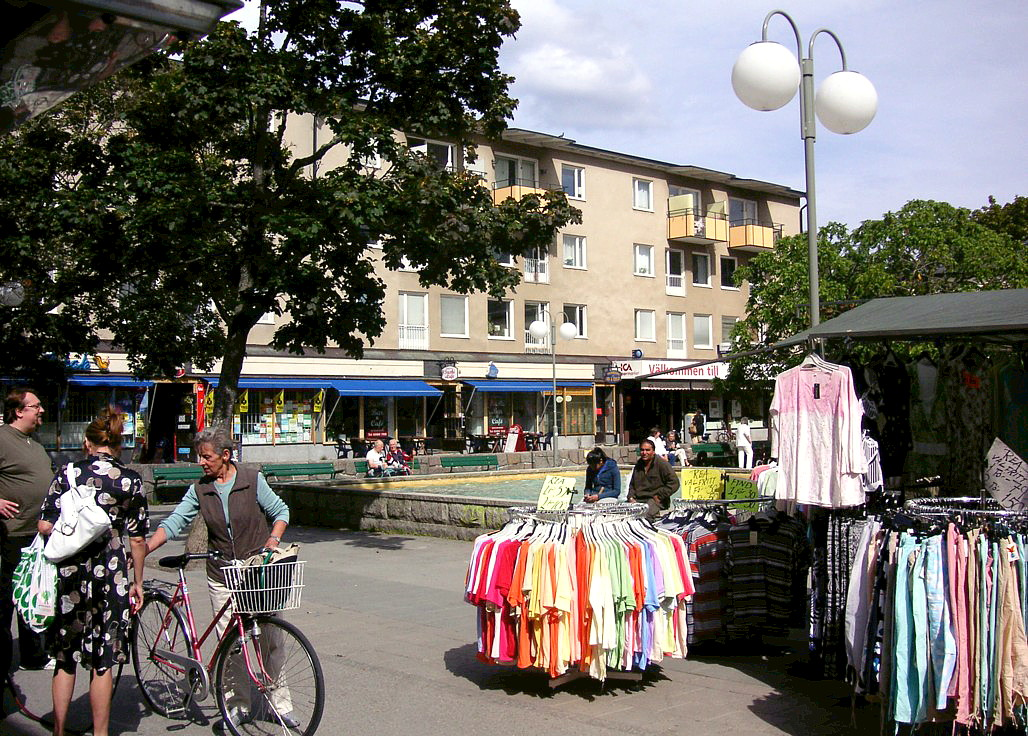
Lagaplan, Bagarmossen.

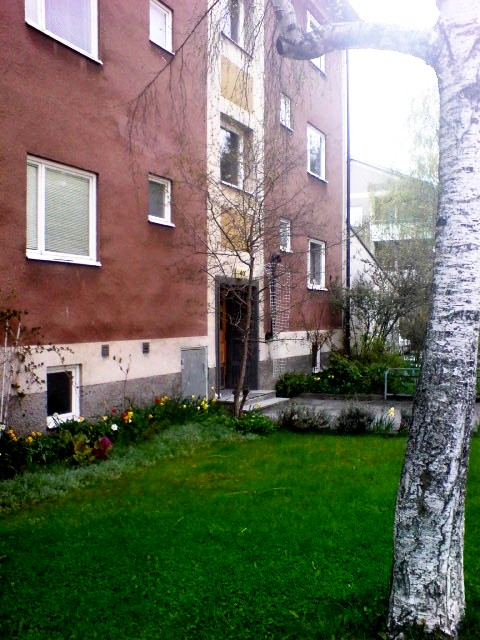
The entrance of a typical 1950s apartment building in Bagarmossen.

Bagarmossen is a district within Skarpnäck borough of Stockholm, Sweden. Bagarmossen had 10 914 inhabitants as of December 31, 2009.

== Geography and transportation ==
Bagarmossen is located southeast of central Stockholm, neighbouring the Skarpnäcks gård district to the south and west, Kärrtorp to the northwest, and the nature reserve Nackareservatet in Nacka Municipality to the east.

Bagarmossen is served by the Bagarmossen metro station, which is located along the Green Line (Line 17). When the station opened in 1958, it was a surface station and the terminus of Line 17. When Line 17 was extended to Skarpnäck in 1994, this included a new underground station in Bagarmossen, replacing the old surface one. Bagarmossen is also the terminus of the 161 bus line to Gröndal.

== Architecture ==
Bagarmossen was built mostly during the 1950s, and remains a relatively well-preserved '50s suburb. The apartment buildings along Byälvsvägen were built in the early 1970s as a part of the million programme. New apartment buildings were constructed near the metro station in the early 1990s, and in recent years, Bagarmossen has seen several new developments, mostly in the northwest.

When the area was first built in the 1950s, it received some international recognition because of the consistent separation of pedestrian and road traffic - leading to plenty of walking paths. The houses were also built to fit with the natural conditions. The courtyards constructed along with the houses in the 1950s are well-designed with pines, vulvae, spruce trees and lawns.

== Demographics ==
Bagarmossen has 10,951 inhabitants as of December 31, 2009. People with a foreign background (in this case, born outside Sweden, or with both parents born outside Sweden) constituted 33.3% of the population. The same figure for Skarpnäck borough was 26.6%, and 28.7% for Stockholm as a whole.

The unemployment rate in Bagarmossen was 4.9% as of October 31, 2009. In comparison, the unemployment rate of the Skarpnäck borough was 3.8%, and 3.6% of Stockholm as a whole. The average annual income per person in Bagarmossen was 222,200 Swedish kronor in 2008, this was lower than the average income of the Skarpnäck borough, 250,200 Swedish kronor, as well as the Stockholm average of 294,500 Swedish kronor.

=== Election results ===
==== Stockholm municipal election, 2006 ====
The results of the 2006 Stockholm municipal election differed largely between Bagarmossen, Skarpnäck borough and Stockholm as a whole. While the centre-right Alliance for Sweden earned a majority in Stockholm, they were behind the red-greens in both Bagarmossen and Skarpnäck borough. The voter turnout in Bagarmossen was 71.0%, compared to 76.3% in Skarpnäck borough, and 79.1% for Stockholm as a whole. Overall, the results were very similar to those of the Kärrtorp district.

Party	Stockholm	Skarpnäck	Bagarmossen
Social Democrats (s)	24.4%	30.6%	36.0%
Left Party (v)	7.9%	13.1%	15.5%
Green Party (mp)	9.2%	13.9%	13.0%
Moderate Party (m)	37.2%	23.2%	17.8%
Liberal People's Party (fp)	9.6%	7.8%	5.7%
Christian Democrats (kd)	3.9%	3.5%	3.6%
Centre Party (c)	3.1%	2.8%	2.0%
Other	4.5%	5.1%	6.3%

Alliance for Sweden (m, c, fp, kd)	53.9%	37.2%	29.1%
Red-Green bloc (s, v, mp)	41.5%	57.6%	64.5%

== Sports ==
The following sports clubs are located in Bagarmossen:

- Bagarmossen Kärrtorp BK
