= Skarpnäck metro station =

Stockholm Metro station

Skarpnäck
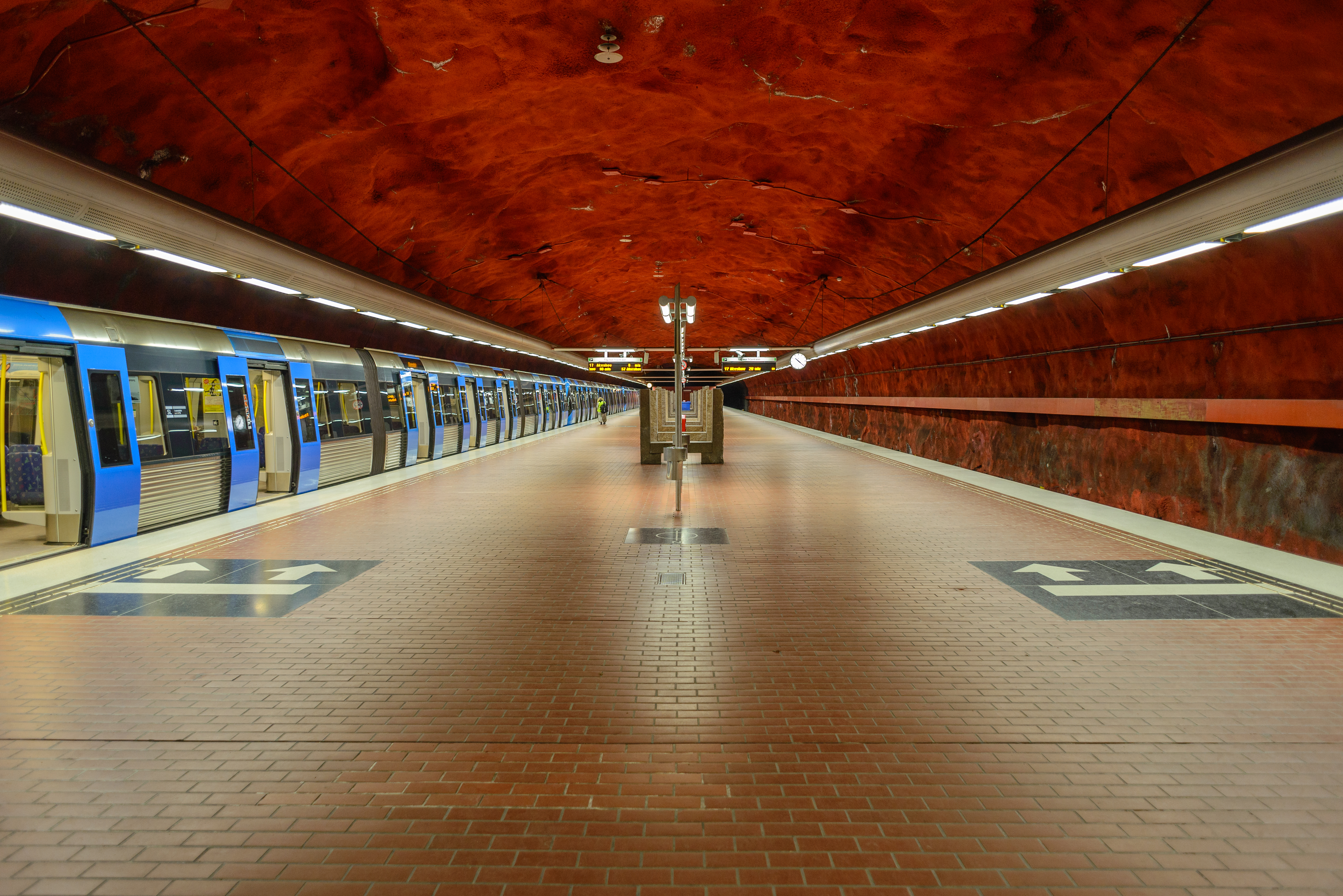
- Platform with a C20 train, 2014

General information
- Coordinates: 59°15′59″N 18°7′57″E
- Elevation: 1.7 m (5.6 ft) AMSL
- System: Stockholm Metro station
- Owner: Storstockholms Lokaltrafik
- Line: Green Line
- Distance: 8.1 km (5.0 mi) from Slussen
- Platforms: 1 island platform
- Tracks: 2

Construction
- Structure type: Underground
- Depth: 25 m (82 ft)
- Accessible: Yes

Other information
- Station code: SNK

History
- Opened: 15 August 1994; 32 years ago

Passengers
- 2019: 5,200 boarding per weekday

Services
Preceding station	Stockholm Metro	Following station
Bagarmossen towards Åkeshov	Line 17	Terminus
Location
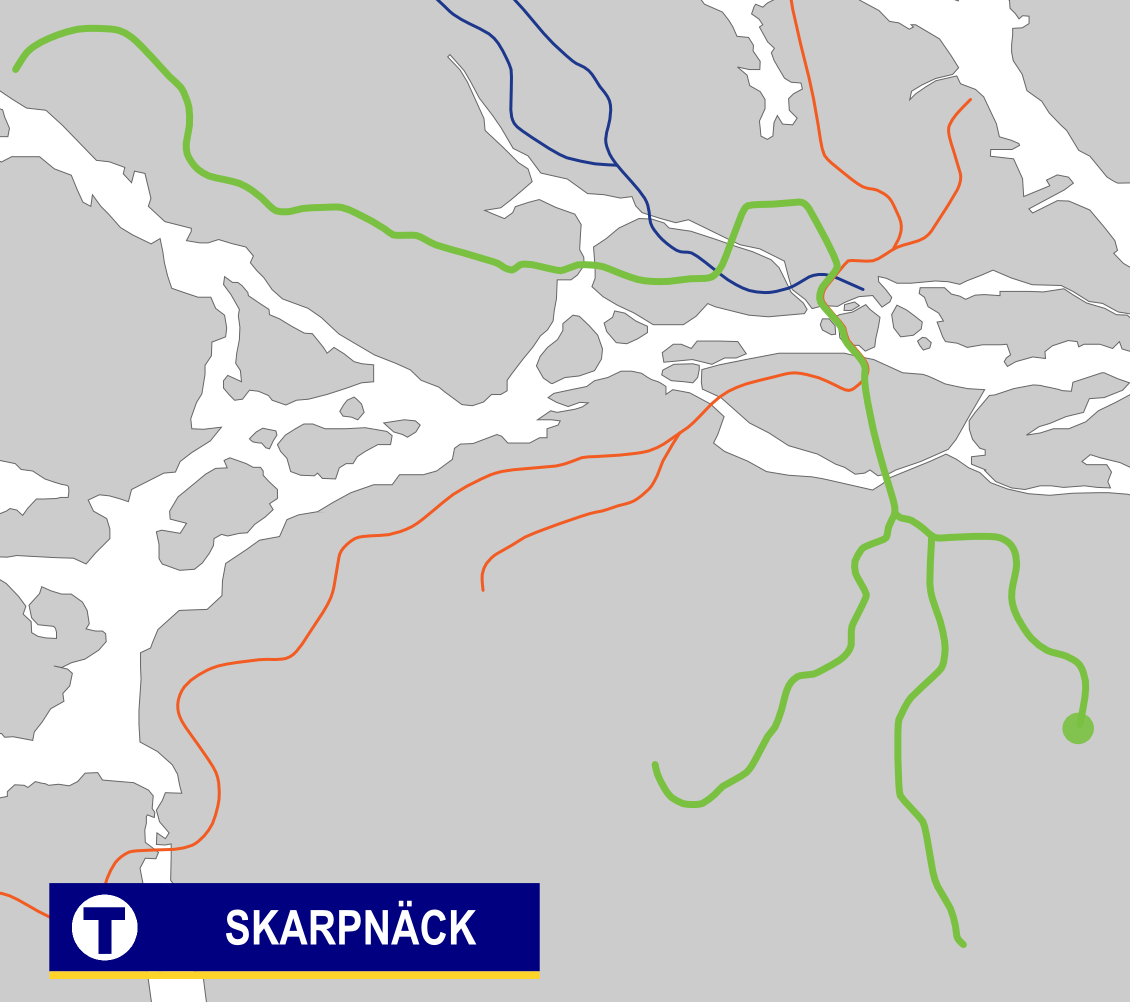

Skarpnäck is a Stockholm Metro station located in the Skarpnäcksfältet subdistrict of Skarpnäcks Gård district, Skarpnäck borough.

The station is the southern terminus for the Green Line 17 and the easternmost Stockholm Metro station (as of 2026). The station is 25 metres (82 ft) below ground and was opened on 15 August 1994 as a one-station extension from Bagarmossen, making it the hundredth station in the Stockholm metro. As of September 2026 it is still the newest station in the system. The underground Bagarmossen metro station was opened at the same time, but replaced an older station in Bagarmossen, which was closed on 8 July 1994.

Skarpnäck is an underground station with a single vault spanning across the island platform and tracks; its span of 22 metres (72 ft) is the largest in the Stockholm metro. The station artwork by American sculptor Richard Nonas consists of seventeen granite "benches" placed along the platform, as well as a red clinker floor and red-painted shotcrete walls alluding to the red brick buildings in Skarpnäck.

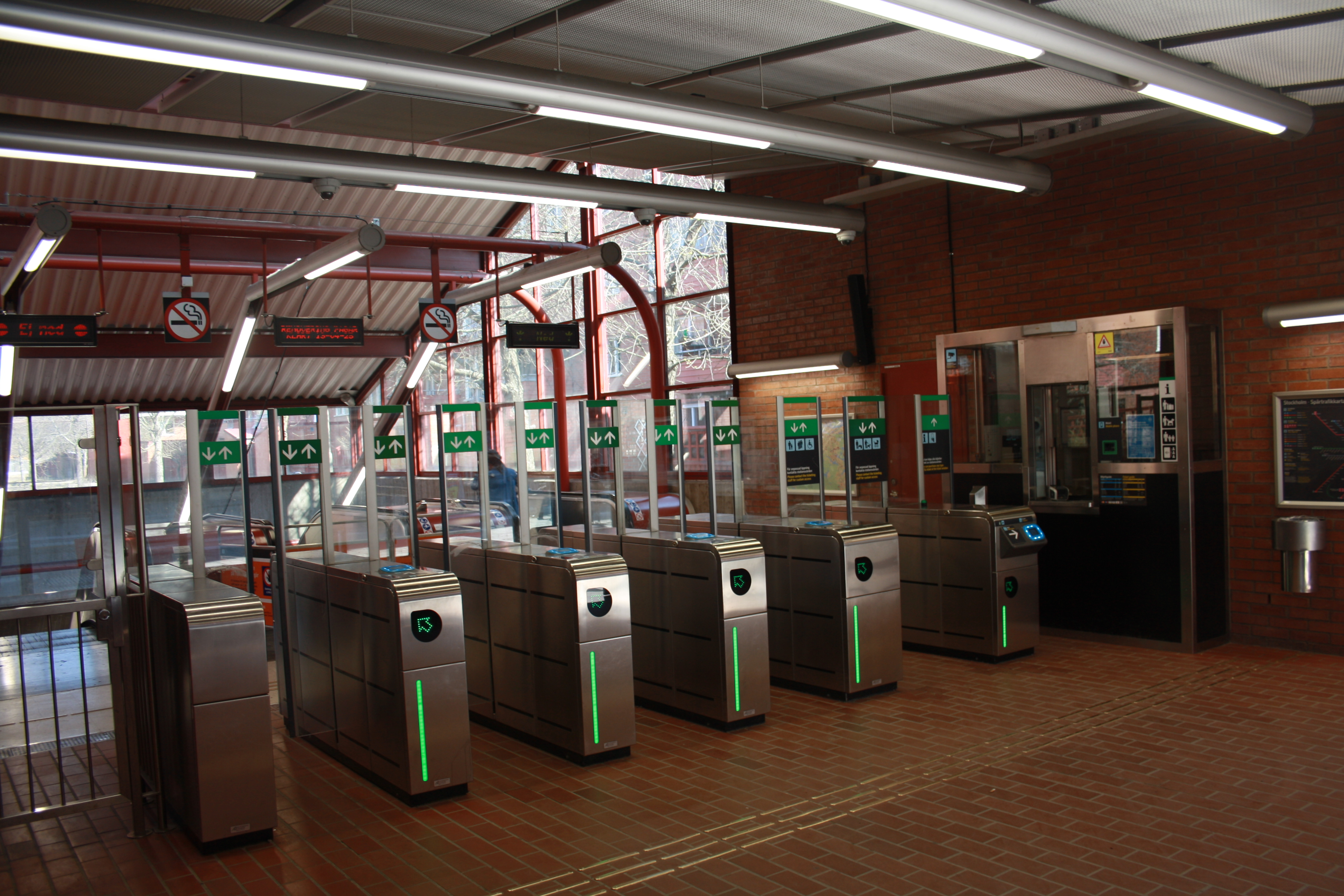
Ticket barriers and escalator access to the underground platform

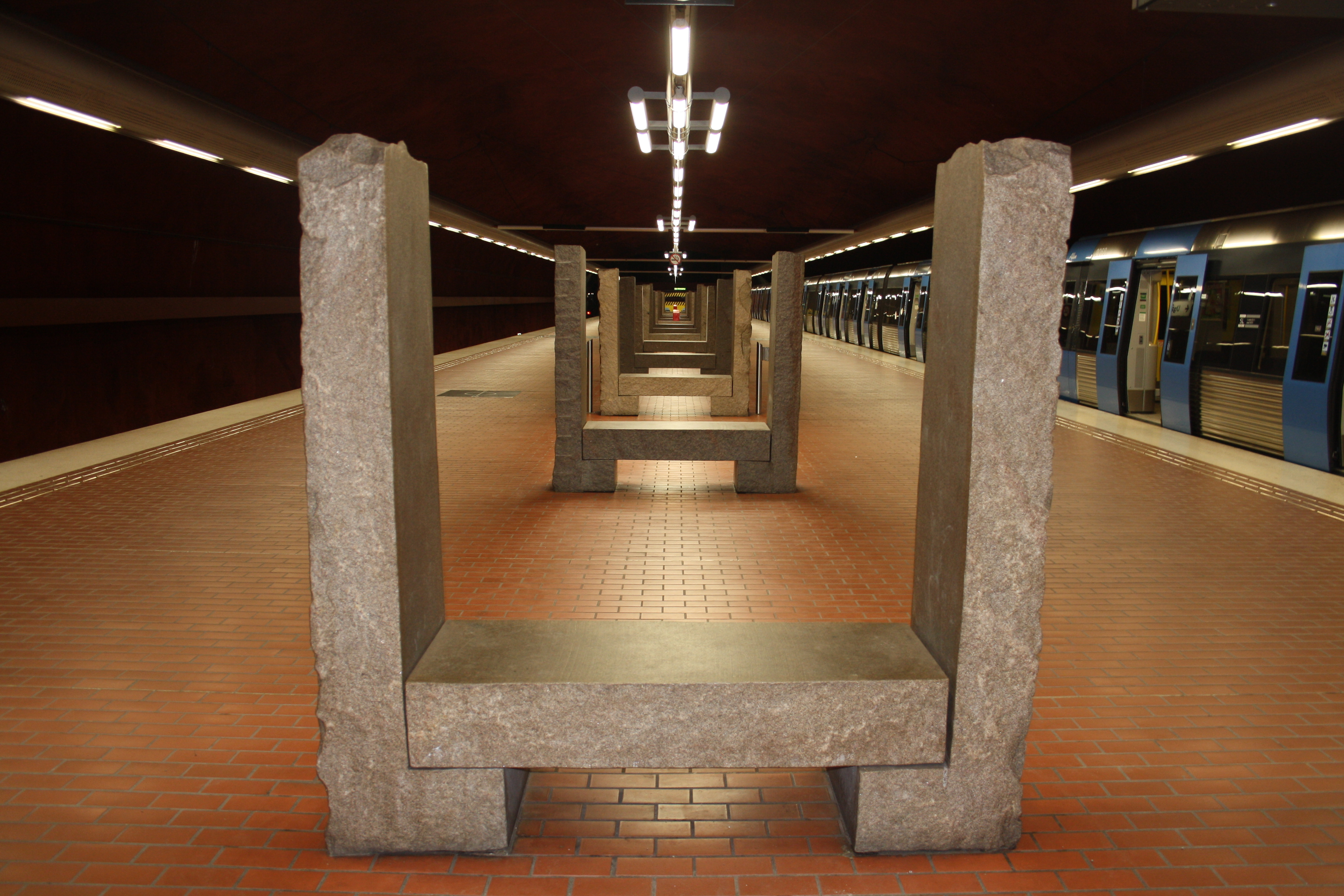
Granite bench
