= 1953 Skarpnäcksloppet =

- Non-championship race in the 1953 Formula One season

Race details
- Date: 13 September 1953
- Official name: III Skarpnäcksloppet
- Location: Skarpnäck, Stockholm, Sweden
- Course: Skarpnäck Airfield
- Course length: 1.70 km (1.06 miles)
- Distance: 15 laps, 25.50 km (15.90 miles)

Pole position
Driver	(United Kingdom) Rodney Nuckey	Cooper-Bristol
- Time: 59.8s

Podium
First	(Sweden) Erik Lundgren	Ford Special
Second	(Finland) Leo Mattila	Cooper T12-JAP
Third	(Sweden) Ewald Hagström	Ford Special

The III Skarpnäcksloppet was a non-championship Formula One motor race held at Skarpnäck Airfield, Skarpnäck, Stockholm on 13 September 1953. The race was won by Erik Lundgren in a Ford Special.

== Results ==
Pos	No.	Driver	Car	Time/Retired
1	49	(Sweden) Erik Lundgren	Ford Special	15:41.9, 97.47kph
2	13	(Finland) Leo Mattila	Cooper T12-Bristol	+3.5s
3	57	(Sweden) Ewald Hagström	Ford Special	+8.2s
4	43	(Sweden) Arne Lindberg	Kaiser Special	+54.5s
5	11	(Finland) Evert Saloranta	Ford Special	+58.7s
6	47	(Sweden) Lars-Emil Bergström	Buick Special	+1 lap
7	60	(Sweden) Gösta Kvarnström	Ford Special	+1 lap
8	53	(Sweden) Valdemar Sterner	BL Special-Ferrari	+1 lap
Ret	68	(Sweden) Gunnar Carlsson	Maserati	
Ret	52	(Sweden) Erik Carlsson	Ford Special	
Ret	56	(Sweden) Ola By	Alfa Romeo 8C-Ford	
Ret	69	(West Germany) Adolf Lang	Veritas RS-BMW 328	
Ret	84	(United Kingdom) Rodney Nuckey	Cooper T23-Bristol	
DNA	48	(United Kingdom) Bernhard Eriksson	Ford Special	

Previous race: 1953 RedeX Trophy	Formula One non-championship races 1953 season	Next race: 1953 London Trophy
Previous race: 1952 Skarpnäcksloppet	Skarpnäcksloppet	Next race: 1954 Skarpnäcksloppet
