= Bagarmossen metro station =

Stockholm Metro station

Bagarmossen
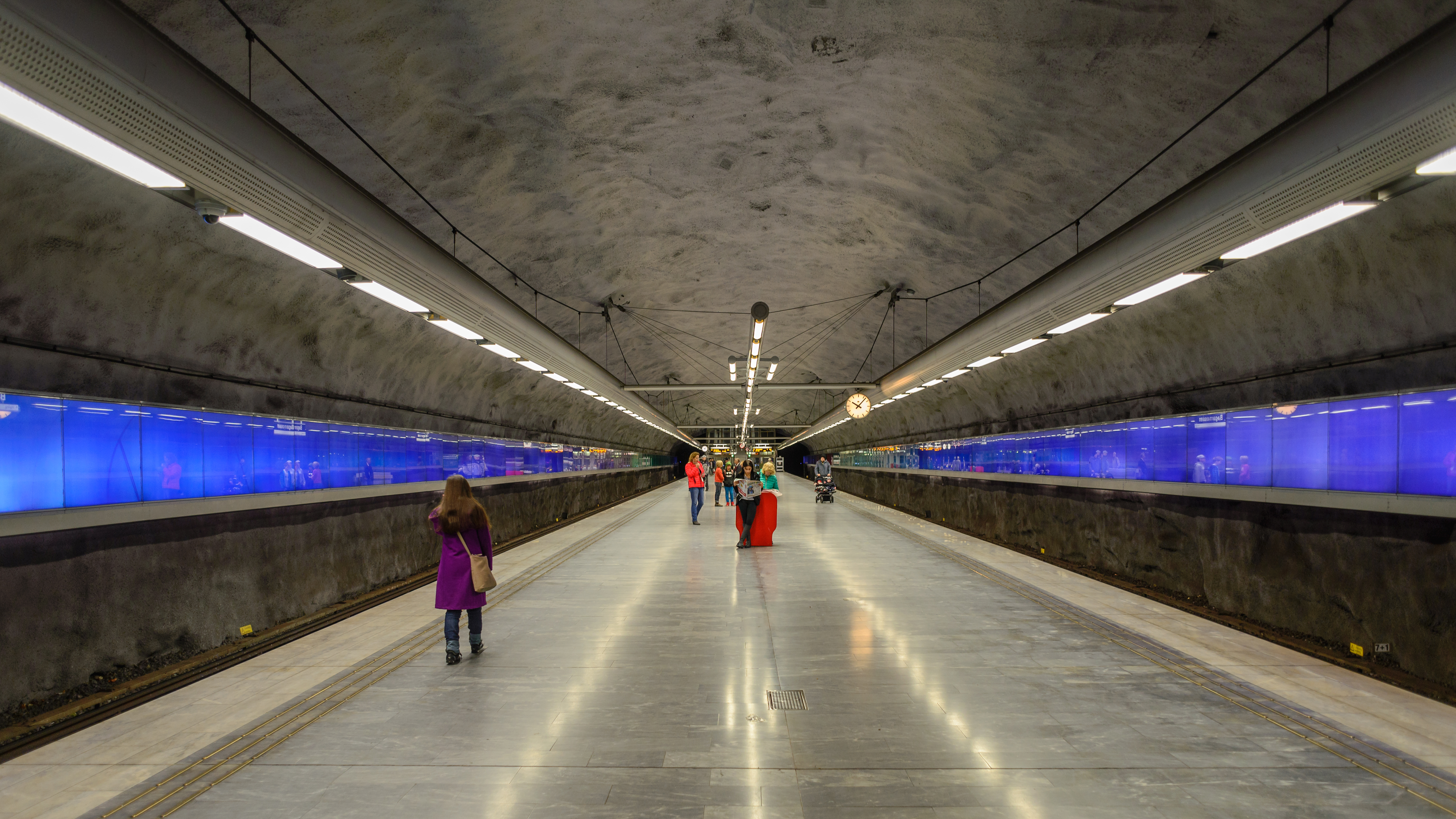
- Bagarmossen metro station platform, October 2014

General information
- Location: Bagarmossen, Söderort
- Coordinates: 59°16′34″N 18°07′53″E
- System: Stockholm Metro station
- Owner: Storstockholms Lokaltrafik
- Platforms: 1 island platform
- Tracks: 2

Construction
- Structure type: Underground
- Depth: 19 m (62 ft)
- Accessible: Yes

Other information
- Station code: BAM

History
- Opened: 18 November 1958; 67 years ago
- Closed: August 15, 1994 (Surface-level station)
- Rebuilt: 15 August 1994 (Underground station)

Passengers
- 2019: 6,650 boarding per weekday

Services
Preceding station	Stockholm Metro	Following station
Kärrtorp towards Åkeshov	Line 17	Skarpnäck Terminus
Location
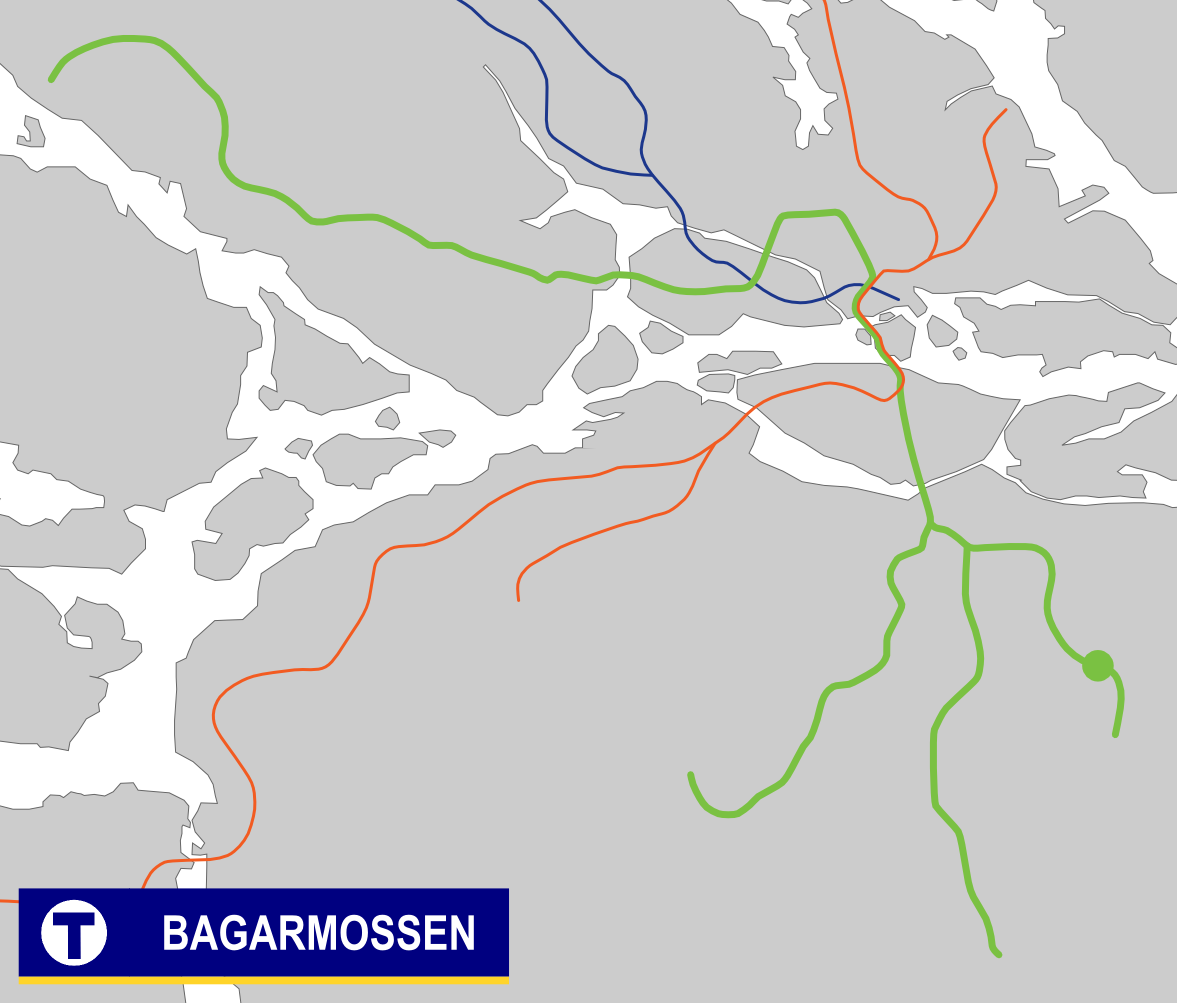

Bagarmossen metro station is a station on the Green Line of the Stockholm Metro, located in Bagarmossen, Söderort in the south of Stockholm. The surface station was opened on 18 November 1958 as the southern terminus of the extension from Hammarbyhöjden. On 15 August 1994, the line was extended further to Skarpnäck.

The current station is 19 metres (62 ft) below ground level and was opened on 15 August 1994 as the extension to Skarpnäck was taken into service and Bagarmossen no longer served as a terminus. The old surface-level station with the same name was in use between 18 November 1958 and 8 July 1994. After the surface level station closed, a number of residential buildings were constructed on the site of the station and its approaches.

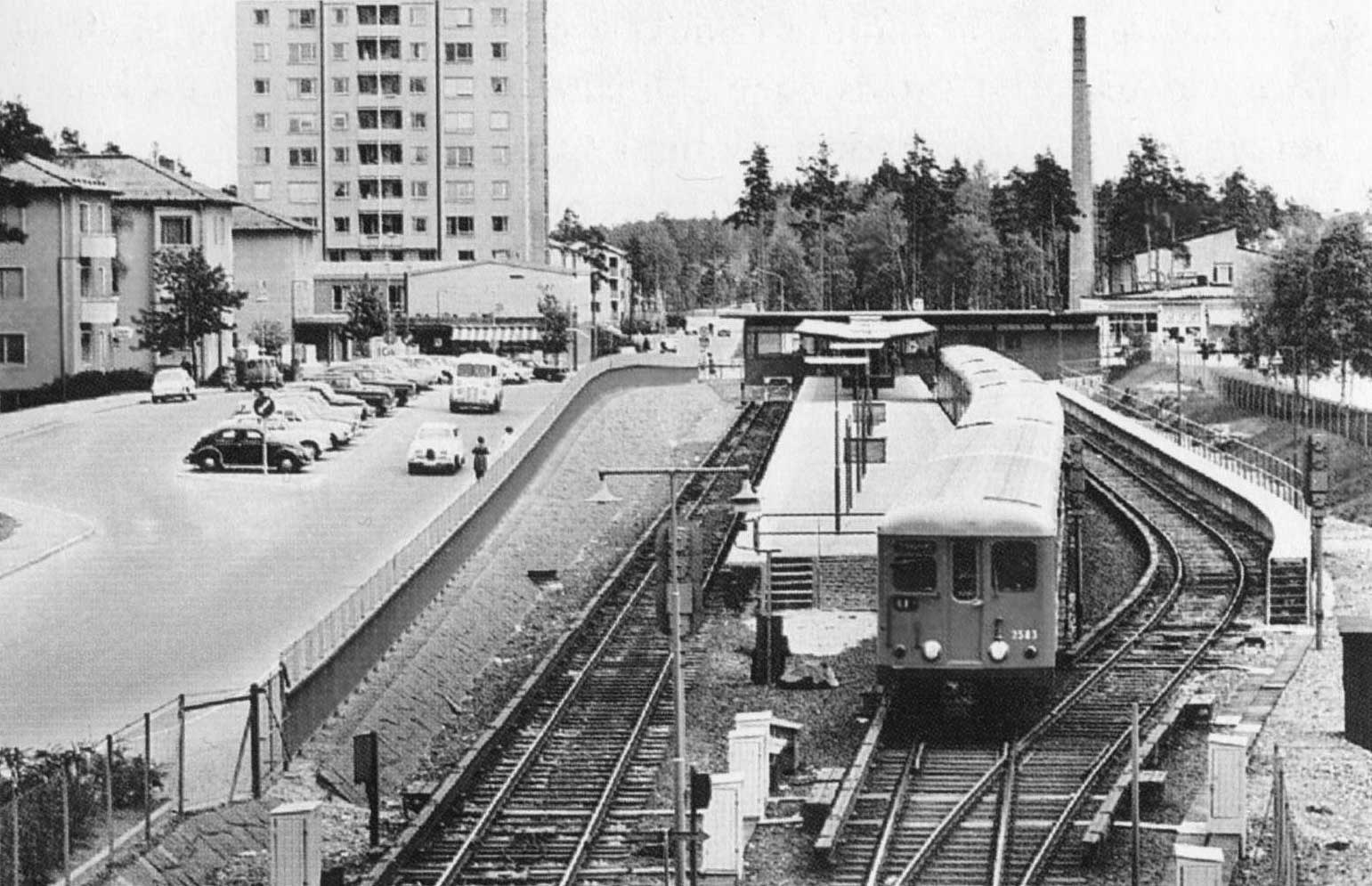
The former station, circa 1960
