= 1948 Stockholm Grand Prix =

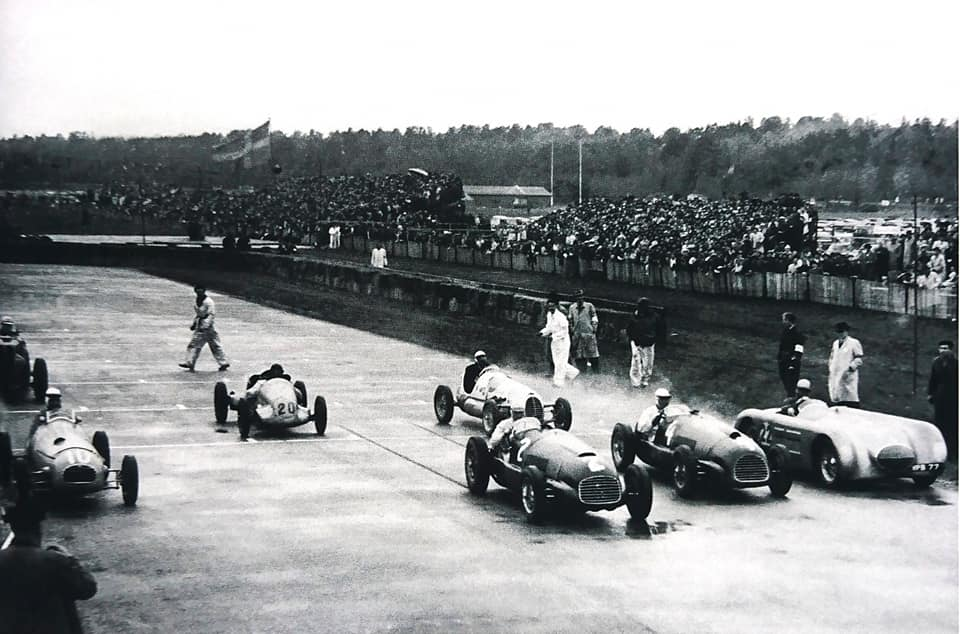
- Start of this race, including two Ferraris (#2 and #4)

Race details
- Date: 29–30 May 1948
- Location: Stockholm, Sweden
- Course: Converted airfield
- Course length: 2.20 km (1.37 miles)

Podium
First	(Thailand) B. Bira	Simca-Gordini
Second	(Italy) Clemente Biondetti	Scuderia Ferrari
Third	(United States) Harry Schell	Cisitalia

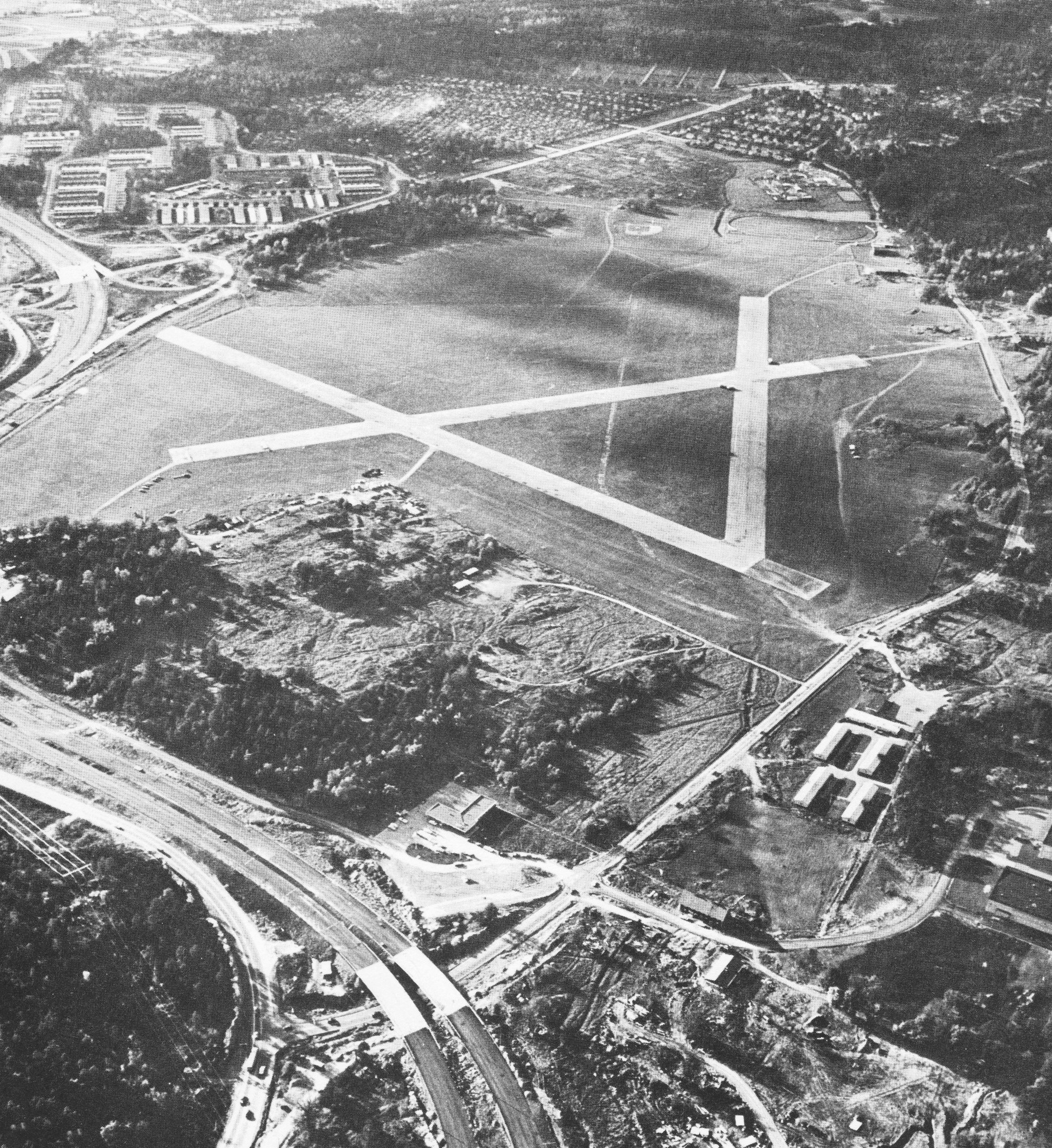
Skarpnäck Airfield in 1967 showing the track formed from the triangular shape of the three intersecting runways

The 1948 Stockholm Grand Prix was a Grand Prix race held according to the then new Formula Two rules, at Skarpnäck Airfield outside Stockholm on 30 May 1948. It was won by B. Bira in a Simca-Gordini T15 entered by Equipe Gordini. At first he was stripped of his victory. This was due to the start, in which Prince Bertil had provided help by push-starting B. Biras car. First a year later, B. Bira was officially acknowledge winner again.

The circuit was 1.37 miles (2.20 km) long and had five turns in an overall triangular shape.

It was the only running of the Stockholm Grand Prix.
