= Pungpinan =

- subdistrict
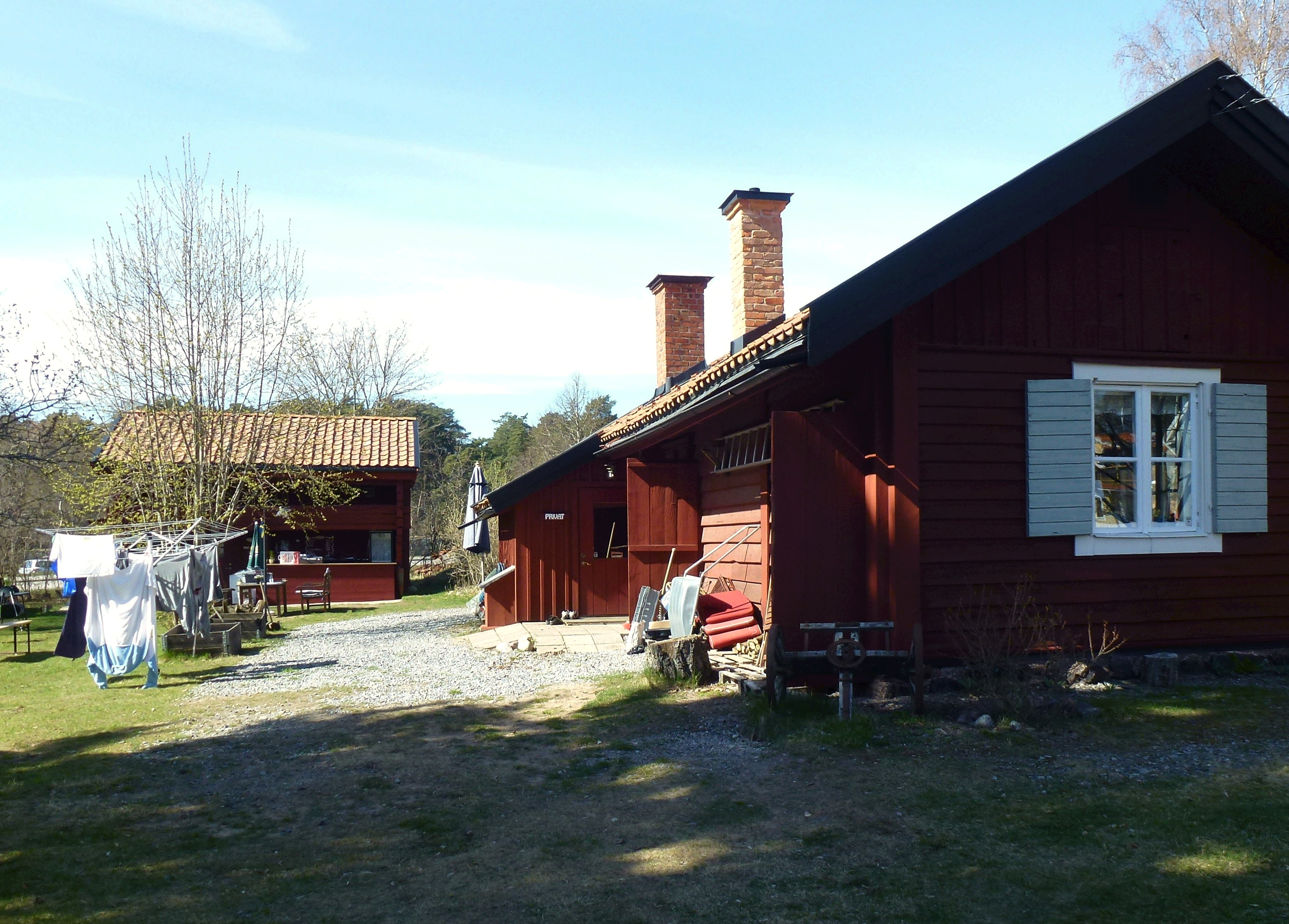

- Location within Stockholm
- Coordinates: 59°16′21.17″N 18°6′38.57″E

Pungpinan is a small subdistrict of Skarpnäcks Gård in Skarpnäck borough in Stockholm that consists mostly of detached houses.
