= Skarpnäck Airfield =

Former airfield in Sweden

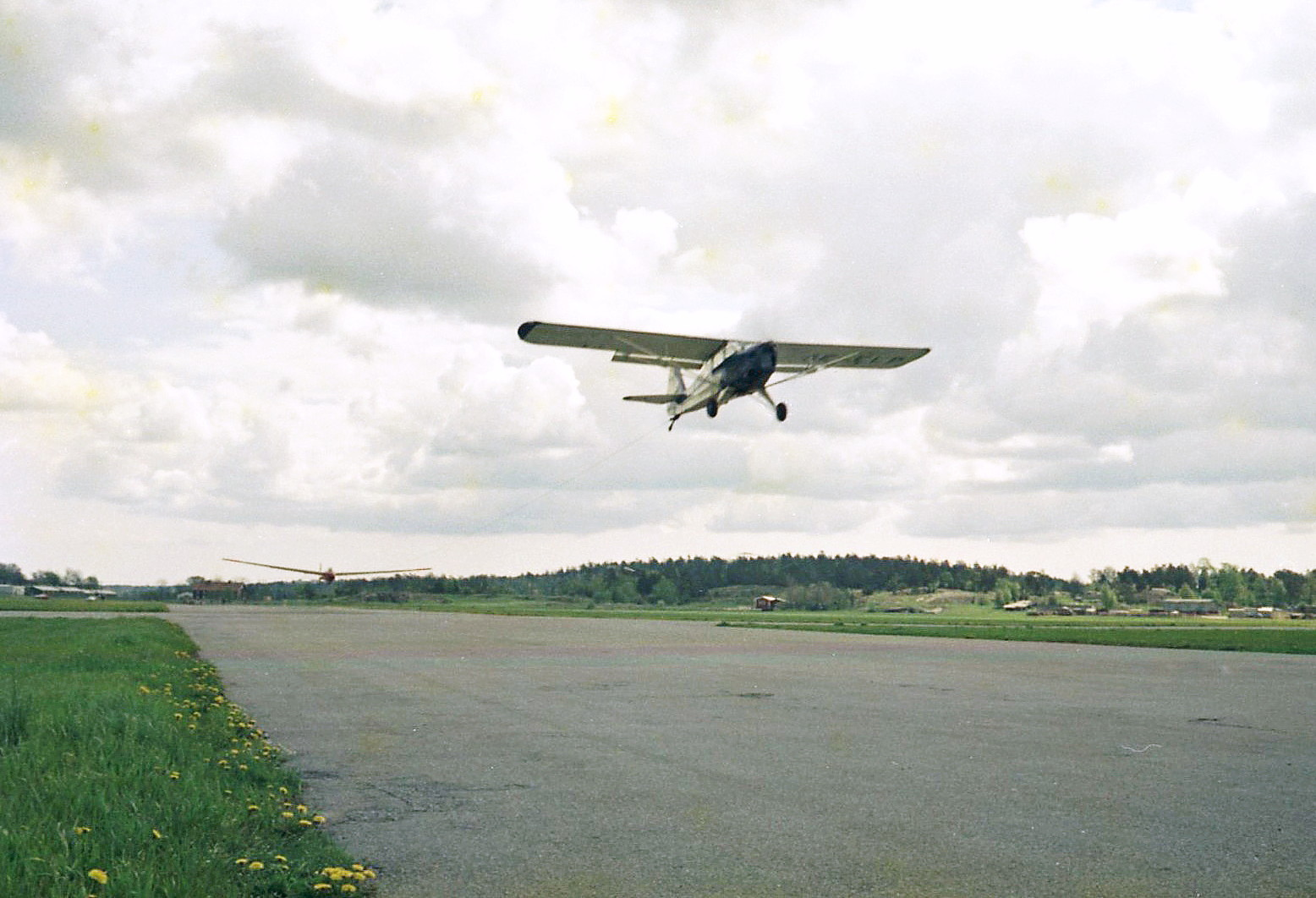
Sailplane at Skarpnäck Airfield in 1972.

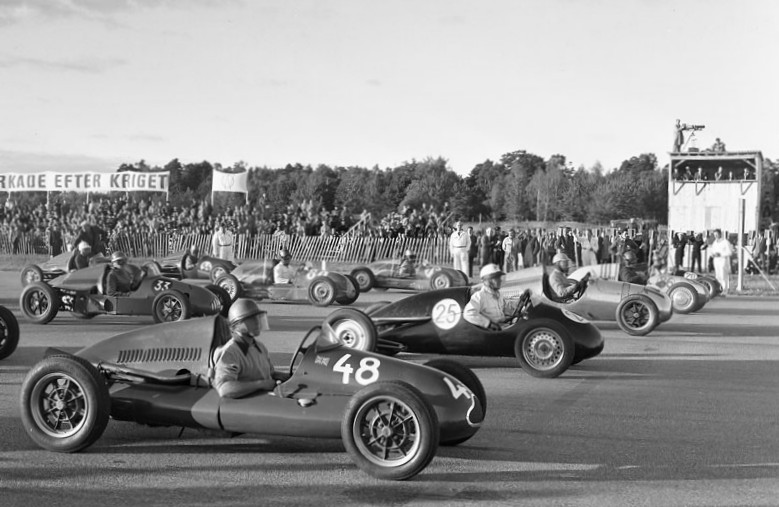
Skarpnäcksloppet 1952.

Skarpnäck Airfield (Swedish: Skarpnäcks Flygfält) was an airfield on Skarpnäcksfältet, a subdistrict of Skarpnäck borough, Stockholm, Sweden. It was mostly used for gliding, and was closed in 1980. Apartment buildings were built at the site in the following years.

The airport was used as an auto racing circuit for the 1948 Stockholm Grand Prix, a Formula Two race, and the following year the Swedish Summer Grand Prix was held here. Automobile Racing were arranged the following years as well.

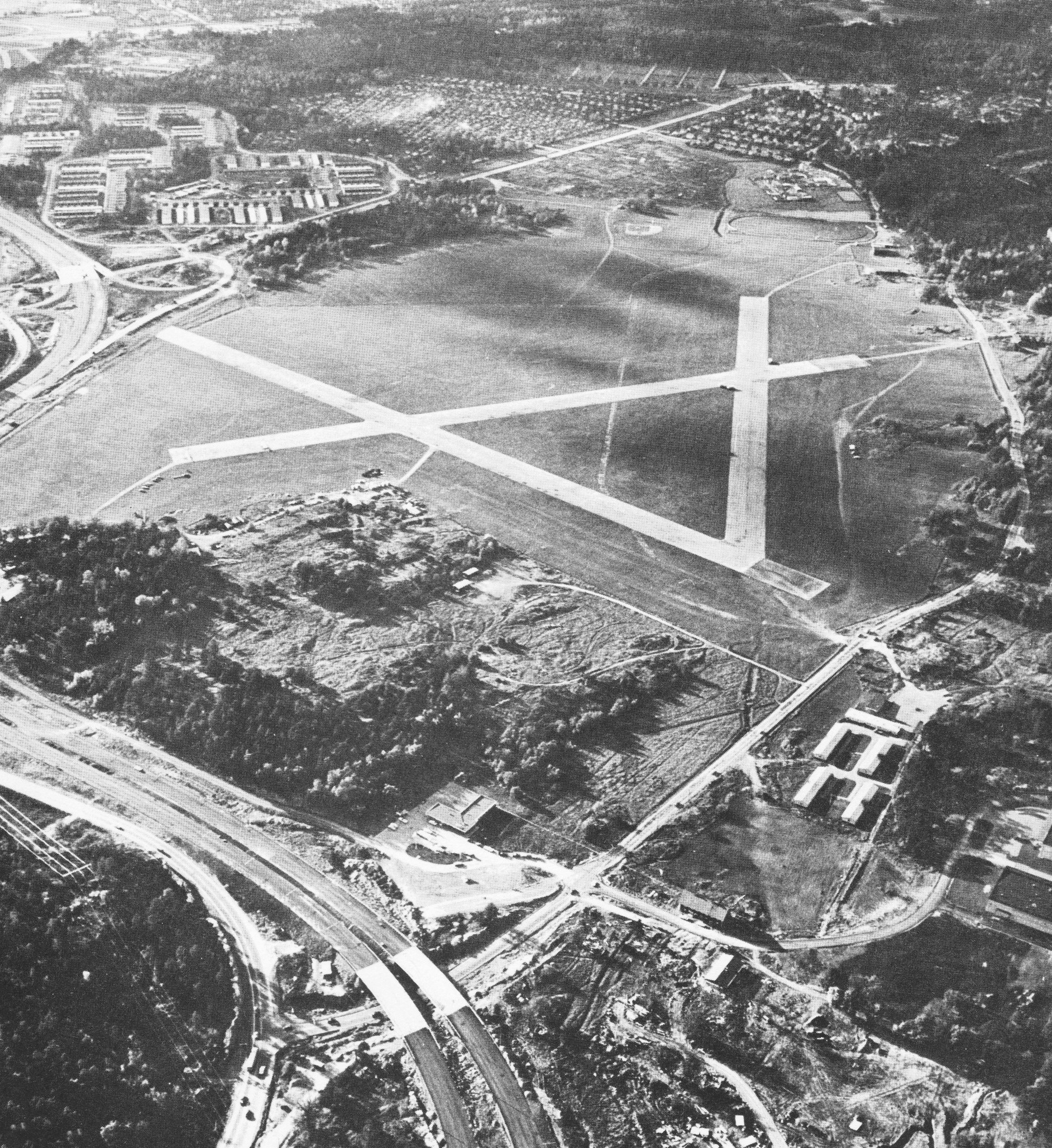
Skarpnäck Airfield in 1967.

== Lap Records ==
The official race lap records at Skarpnäck Airfield are listed as:

Category	Time	Driver	Vehicle	Date
Original Circuit (1952–1955): 1.700 km
Formula Two	0:59.800	Rodney Nuckey	Cooper T23	1953 Skarpnäcksloppet
Original Circuit (1948–1951): 3.000 km
Formula Two	1:59.000	Raymond Sommer	Ferrari 166 F2	1948 Stockholm Grand Prix

== See also ==
Skarpnäcksfältet
