= Skarpnäcks gård =

Coordinates: 59°16′1.55″N 18°8′12.04″E

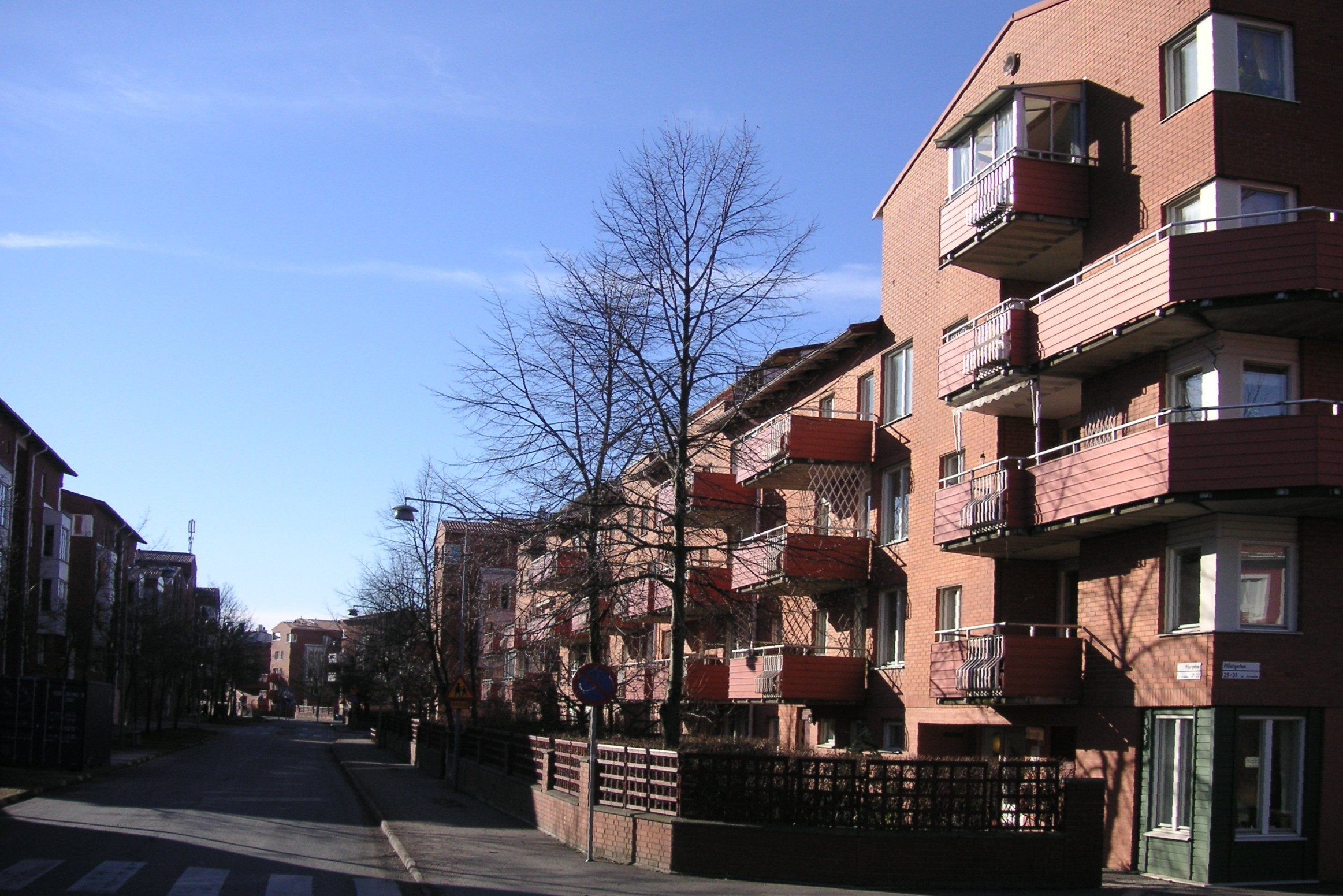
Skarpnäcks gård

Skarpnäcks gård is a district (Swedish: stadsdel) in Skarpnäck in Stockholm Municipality, Sweden. Skarpnäcks Gård has 10,348 inhabitants as of December 31, 2007.

The district was formed in 1963, but the name Skarpnäcks gård has not entered common usage for the area, instead a mixture of the previous district names is used. The Stockholm Municipality and the Police among others present the statistics for the district in two separate parts, one set for the subdistrict Skarpnäcksfältet, and another for the subdistrict Pungpinan.
