= Kärrtorp =

- District of Stockholm
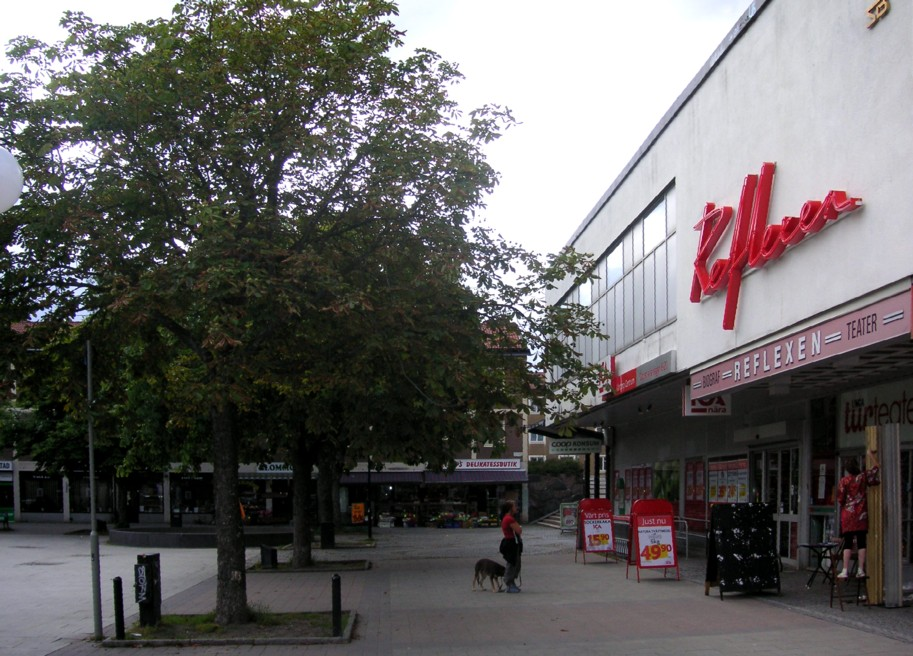
- The square in central Kärrtorp in 2007 (looking southwest from the metro station)

- Location of Kärrtorp in Stockholm Municipality
- Coordinates: 59°17′5.29″N 18°6′48.27″E
- Country: Sweden
- Province: Södermanland
- County: Stockholm County
- Municipality: Stockholm Municipality
- Borough: Skarpnäck borough
- Founded: 1948

Area
  - Total: 1.04 km^{2} (0.40 sq mi)
  - Land: 1.04 km^{2} (0.40 sq mi)
  - Water: 0.00 km^{2} (0 sq mi) 0.0%

Population (December 31, 2009)
  - Total: 4,296
  - Density: 4,130/km^{2} (10,700/sq mi)

Kärrtorp is a district (Swedish: stadsdel) in the Skarpnäck borough of Stockholm, Sweden,. Kärrtorp has 4,296 inhabitants as of December 31, 2009.

== Geography ==
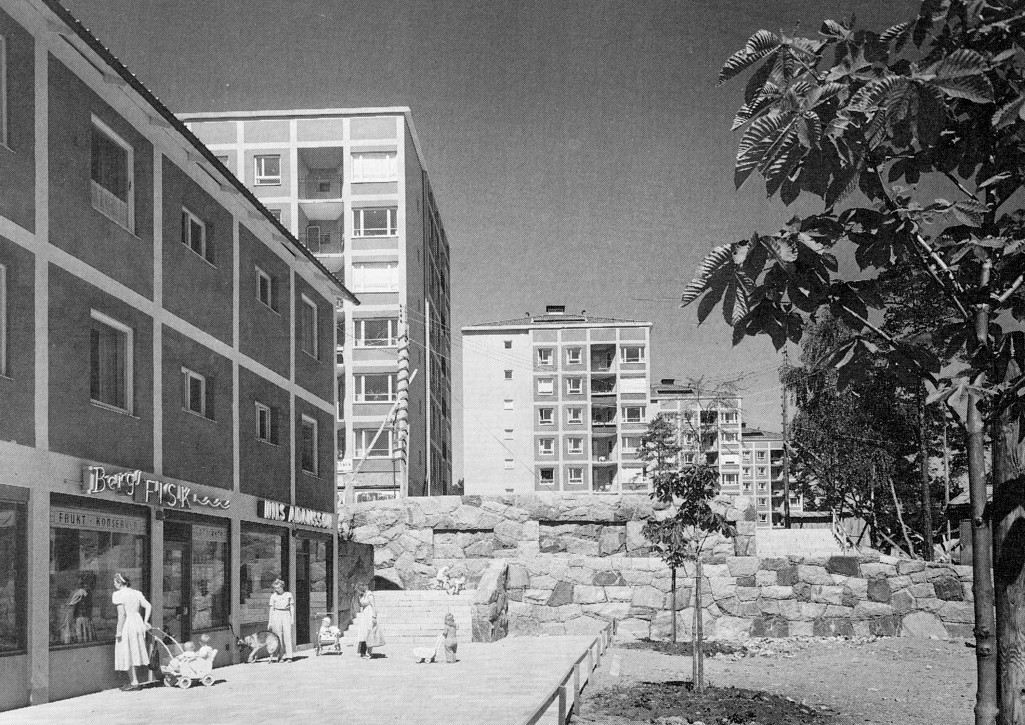
Central Kärrtorp in 1955.

Kärrtorp is a small district located in the southeast of Stockholm. Kärrtorp neighbours Bagarmossen, Skarpnäcks gård (subdistrict Pungpinan), Enskededalen, Gamla Enskede in the Enskede-Årsta-Vantör borough, Hammarbyhöjden, Björkhagen, and the nature reserve Nackareservatet in Nacka municipality.

=== Transportation ===
Kärrtorp is served by the elevated Kärrtorp metro station, which was opened in 1958 and is located along the Green Line (Line 17). Kärrtorp is the terminus of the 163 bus line to Bredäng, and the 180 line to Orhem via Skarpnäcks gård.

The north-south Nynäsvägen motorway is reachable within a few minutes from Kärrtorp. Nynäsvägen goes north towards Södra Länken and the city centre, and south towards the outer suburbs and eventually Nynäshamn.

== History ==
The first development plan of Kärrtorp was made in 1947. At the time, Kärrtorp was intended to be a district of about 8,000 inhabitants. The neighbouring district of Bagarmossen was intended to serve Kärrtorp with a city centre. That plan was however cancelled, and instead a new one was created and followed through with.

Construction of the area was completed in 1952. The majority of houses are three-story apartment buildings, but there are also several higher constructions, including the 13-story building next to the Kärrtorp metro station. The area has largely remained the same, and the original 1950s architecture has been kept, much like in Bagarmossen. Since 2008, new housing developments have begun near Kärrtorps gymnasium.

In December 2013, armed members the neo-Nazistic Nordic Resistance Movement (NMR) attacked an anti-racist demonstration. The attack was counteracted by members of far-left Antifascistisk Aktion and Revolutionary Front (Sweden), who had predicted the attack, as well as the police. The following week, a bigger demonstration was set up as a reaction to the attack, attracting an estimate of 16,000 attendees.

== Demographics ==
Kärrtorp has 4,296 inhabitants as of December 31, 2009. People with foreign background (in this case, born outside Sweden or with both parents born outside Sweden) constituted for 21.0% of the population, which is less than the figure for Skarpnäck borough, 26.6%, as well as the figure for Stockholm as a whole, which is 28.7%.

The unemployment rate in Kärrtorp was 4.1% as of October 31, 2009. In comparison, the unemployment rate of the Skarpnäck borough was 3.8%, and 3.6% of Stockholm as a whole. The average income per person in Kärrtorp was 228,200 Swedish kronor in 2008, lower than the Stockholm average of 294,500 Swedish kronor.

=== Election results ===
==== Stockholm municipal election, 2006 ====
The results of the 2006 Stockholm municipal election differed largely between Kärrtorp, Skarpnäck borough and Stockholm as a whole. While the centre-right Alliance for Sweden earned a majority in Stockholm, they were behind the red-greens in both Kärrtorp and Skarpnäck borough. The voter turnout in Kärrtorp was 76.0%, compared to 76.3% in Skarpnäck borough, and 79.1% for Stockholm as a whole.

Party	Stockholm	Skarpnäck	Kärrtorp
Social Democrats (s)	24.4%	30.6%	36.4%
Left Party (v)	7.9%	13.1%	15.9%
Green Party (mp)	9.2%	13.9%	12.1%
Moderate Party (m)	37.2%	23.2%	18.8%
Liberal People's Party (fp)	9.6%	7.8%	5.8%
Christian Democrats (kd)	3.9%	3.5%	3.3%
Centre Party (c)	3.1%	2.8%	1.9%
Other	4.5%	5.1%	6.0%
Alliance for Sweden (m, c, fp, kd)	53.9%	37.2%	29.7%
Red-Green bloc (s, v, mp)	41.5%	57.6%	64.3%

== Sports ==
The following sports clubs are located in Kärrtorp:

- Bagarmossen Kärrtorp BK

== See also ==
- Anti racism demonstration in Kärrtorp 2013
- Kärrtorp metro station
