= Markuskyrkan =

Church in Björkhagen, Stockholm, Sweden

St. Mark's Church
- Markuskyrkan
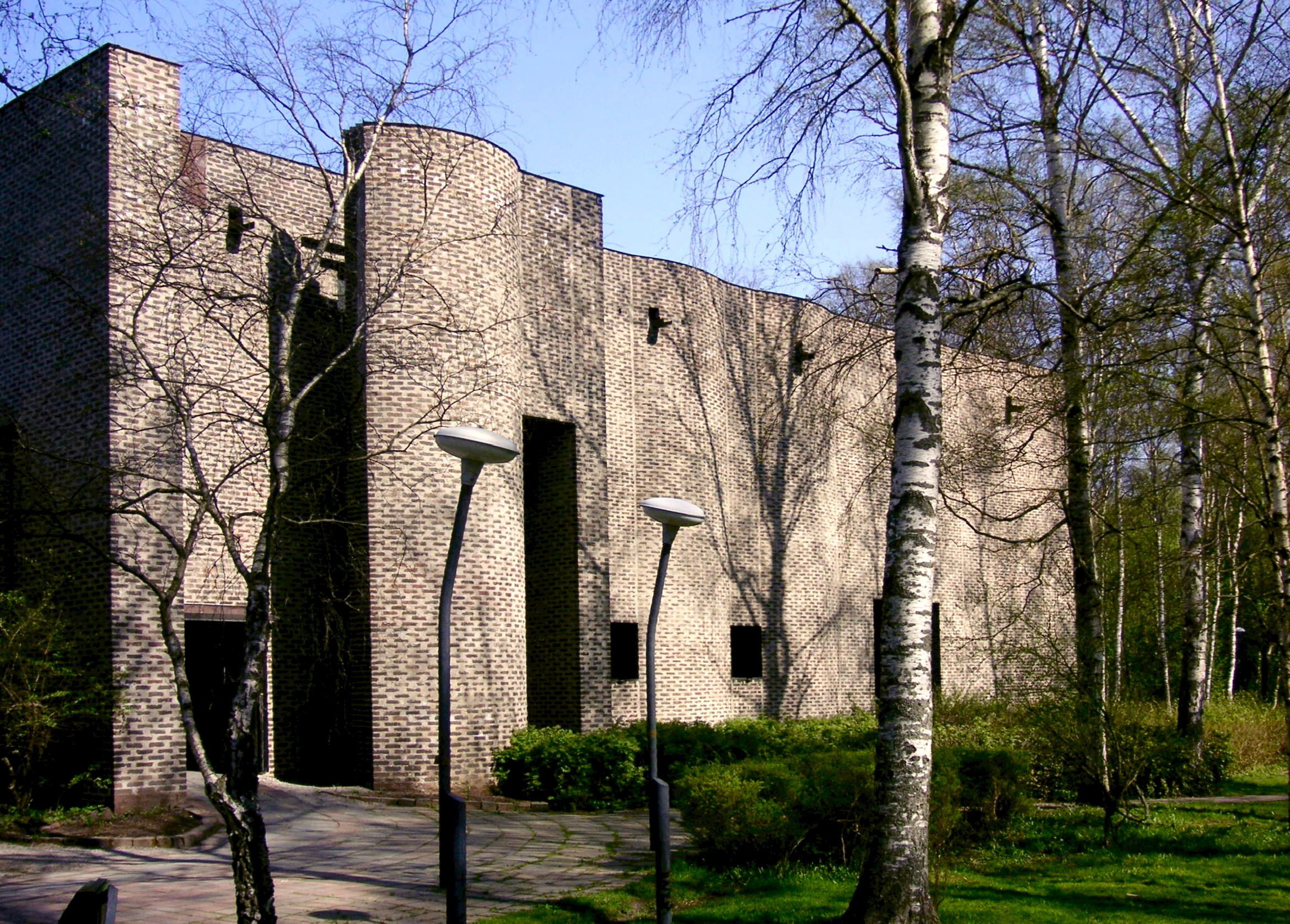
- St. Mark's Church in 2008
- St. Mark's Church
- 59°17′31″N 18°07′01″E
- Address: Malmövägen 51, Björkhagen, Stockholm, Sweden
- Country: Sweden
- Denomination: Church of Sweden

History
- Status: Active parish church

Architecture
- Architect: Sigurd Lewerentz
- Style: Brick church; Brutalist influences
- Groundbreaking: 29 March 1958

Specifications
- Materials: Brick; timber; tile

Administration
- Diocese: Diocese of Stockholm
- Parish: Skarpnäck Parish

Markuskyrkan (St. Mark's Church) is a church in the district of Björkhagen in southern Stockholm, Sweden. It belongs to Skarpnäck Parish in the Church of Sweden and is part of the Diocese of Stockholm.

The church was designed by the architect Sigurd Lewerentz and constructed between 1958 and 1963. Since 1990 the church has been a designated cultural monument by the Swedish National Heritage Board.

The church building is located within a birch grove on former lakebed, a condition that influenced the low and horizontally oriented design. Its construction makes extensive use of brick, timber, and visible technical installations.

== History ==
Björkhagen was established as a new suburb in the 1940s, with the church site identified as a response to the needs of the growing district.

An architectural competition was held in 1955 by the parish council of Enskede and adjudicated by architects Sven Markelius and Ragnar Hjorth. Groundbreaking took place on 29 March 1958. The church was consecrated on 8 May 1960 by Bishop Helge Ljungberg. The building received the inaugural Kasper Salin Prize in 1962. It was designated a protected historic building in 1990.

Markuskyrkan underwent renovation between 2016 and 2018 and reopened in October 2018.

== Architecture ==
The design of Markuskyrkan originated in an invited competition in 1955, in which Lewerentz's proposal was awarded first prize. The commission became his first major church project since the 1930s. The church was built in stages: the nave was consecrated in 1960, and the remainder of the complex was completed in 1963.

Lewerentz drew on early Christian and Near Eastern brick construction traditions, using small, recessed windows and untreated materials. Other materials include ceramic tiles, limestone flooring, and pine seating.

The church precinct is arranged around a rectangular reflecting pool (spegeldammen), with an administration wing and free-standing bell tower to the west. The entrance incorporates a separate timber portico placed in front of the brick façade.

=== Brickwork and craftsmanship ===
Lewerentz required that bricks not be cut on-site; dimensional adjustments were made by varying the width of mortar joints.

Technical installations, such as electrical conduits, were left visible on the interior surfaces. Window units were mounted with elastic sealant directly into brick openings, noted as an early Swedish example of frameless glazing.

Lewerentz also designed the interior fittings, including seating, metalwork, and light fixtures.

=== Spatial character ===
The interior consists mainly of exposed brick walls supported by steel beams. Numerous brass pendant lamps hang over the nave. The altar is placed along the southern wall rather than a central axis. Sliding wooden doors allow the nave to expand into an adjacent assembly hall.

=== Furnishings and art ===
Interior furnishings and liturgical objects were produced by artists Barbro Nilsson and Robert Nilsson. Their works include woven chancel textiles, a bronze crucifix, the baptismal font, silver vessels, candlesticks, and a bronze door relief. The courtyard’s pool features their bronze fountain Lotusblomman (The Lotus Flower).

The original organ, designed by Lewerentz, was later replaced. A new instrument by Bergenblad & Jonsson, with Åkerman & Lund, was completed in 2024.

=== Other buildings ===
The complex includes parish offices, meeting rooms, and a bell tower containing four bells. Since 1960 the bells have been rung manually by the volunteer group Markusringarna. A separate bell outside the entrance is used for the Saturday helgmålsringning (evening ringing).

== Gallery ==
=== Exterior ===
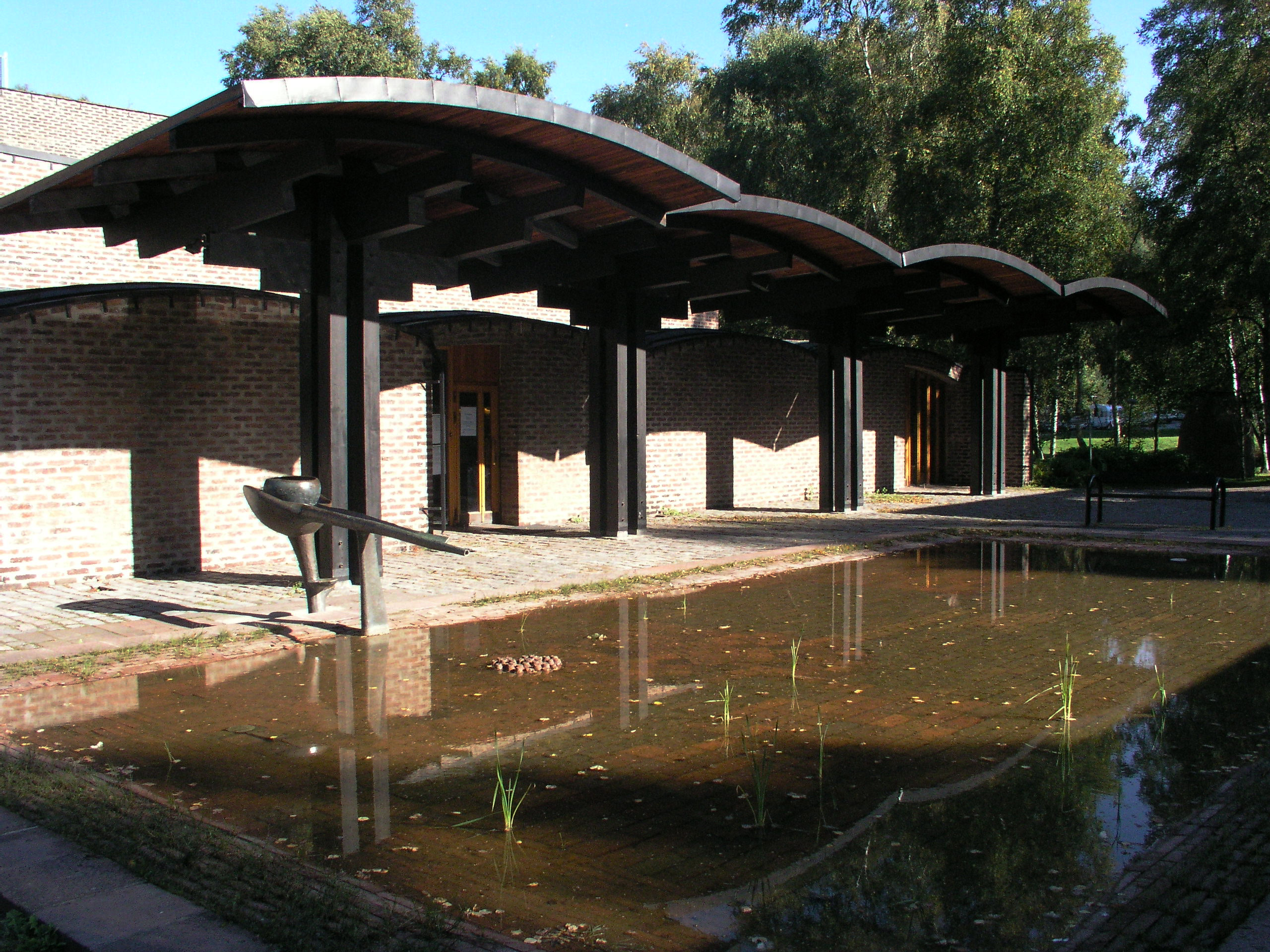
Mirror pond and Lotusblomman

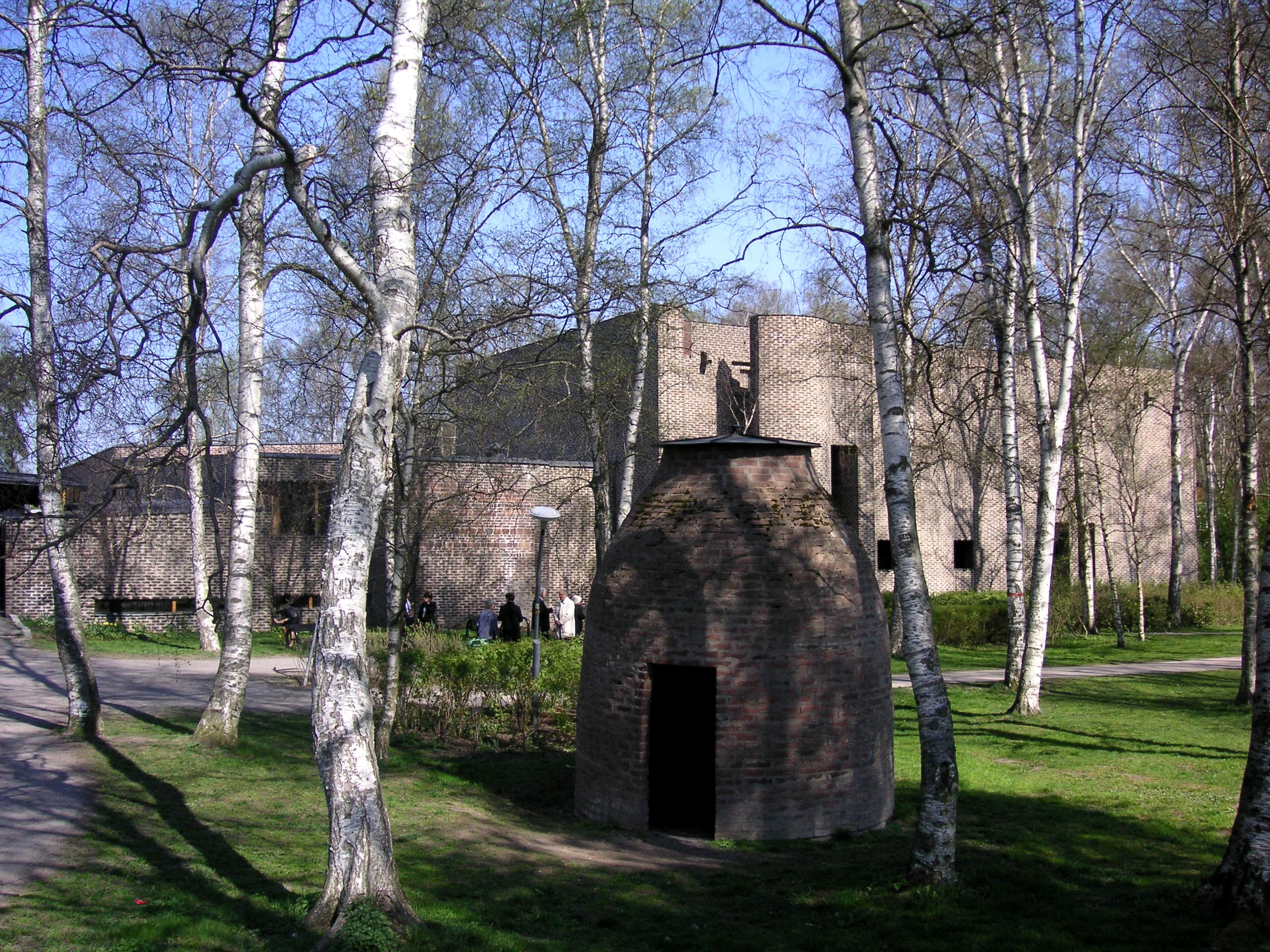
Entrance side with canopy

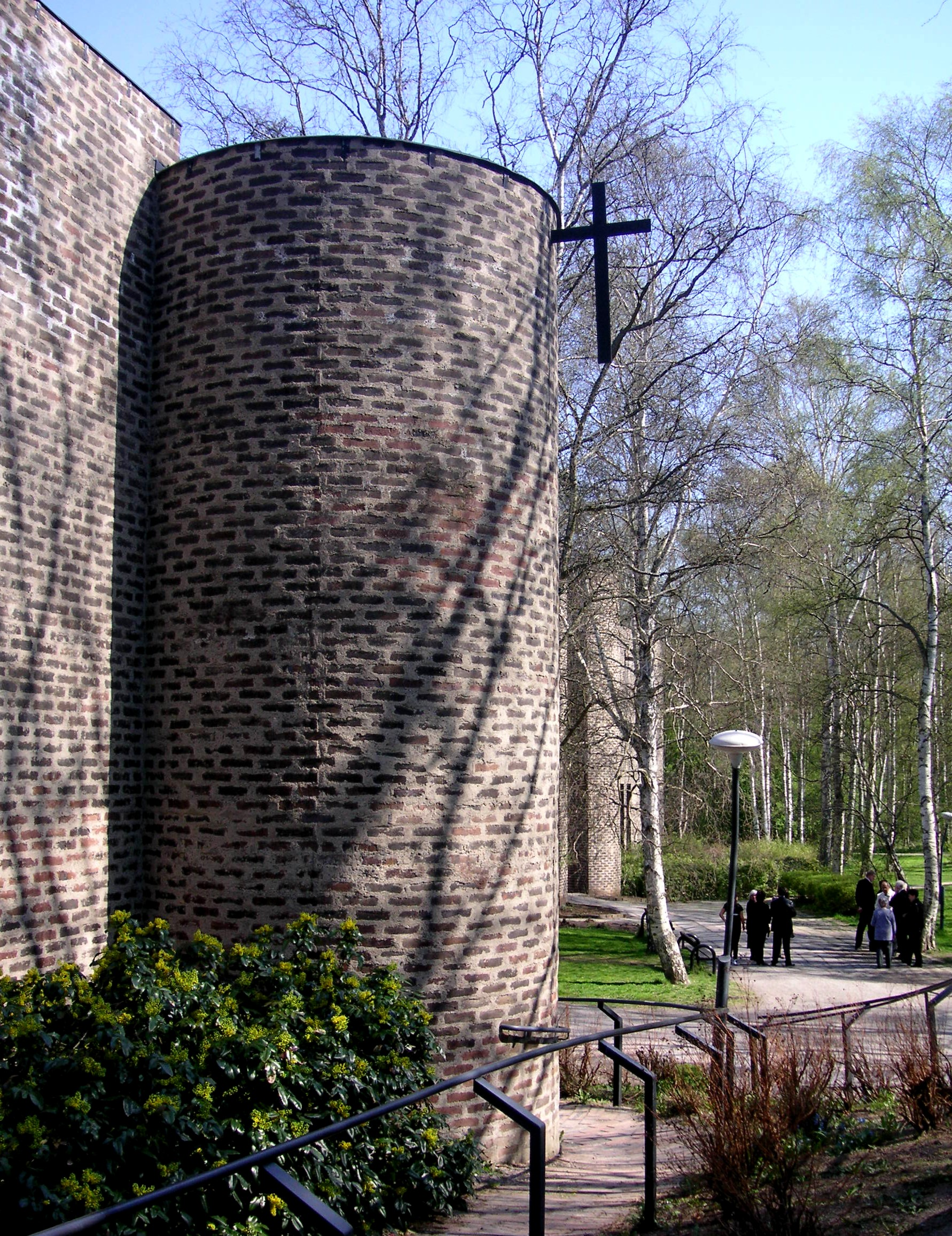
Bell tower

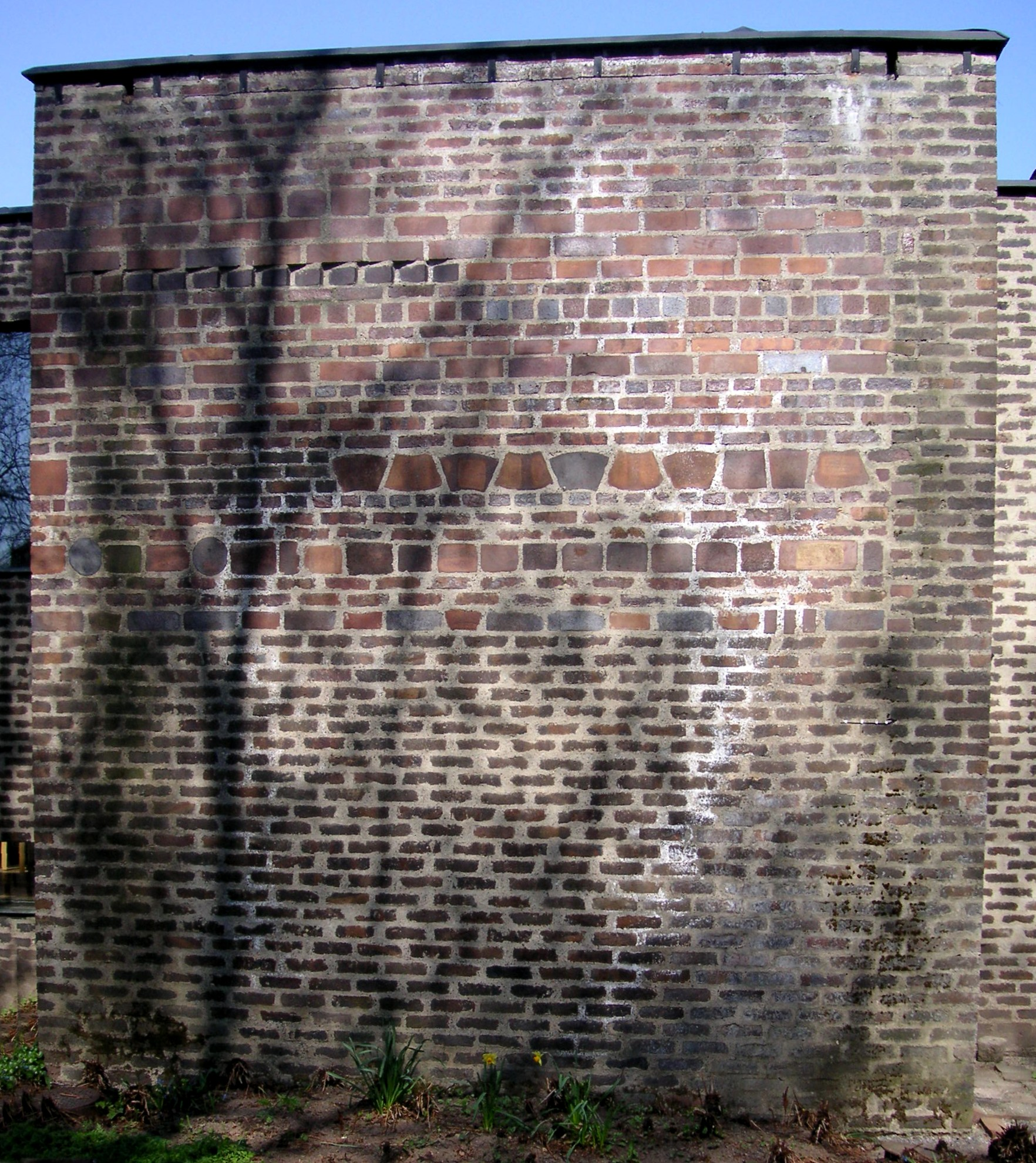
Brickwork detail

=== Interior ===
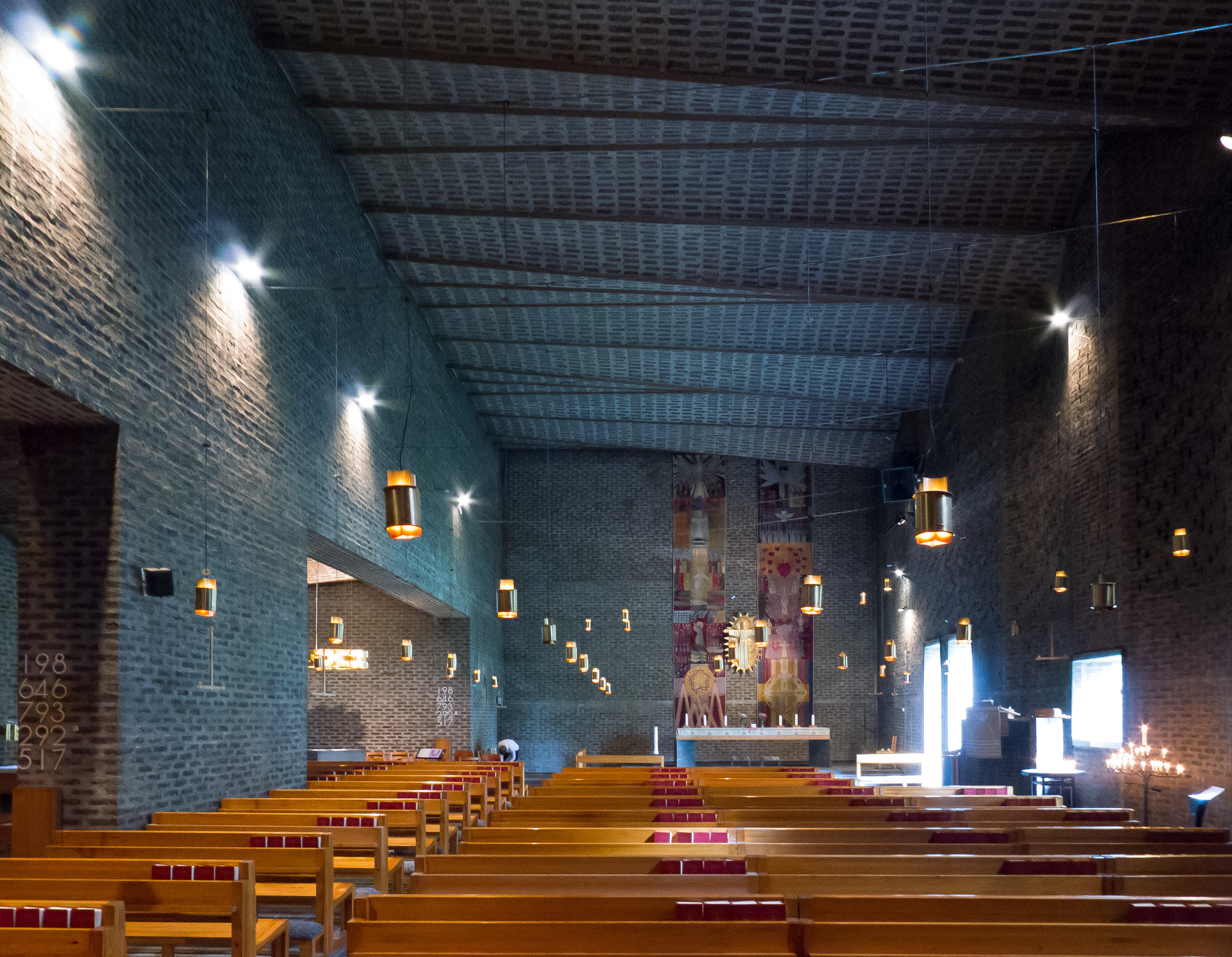
Nave

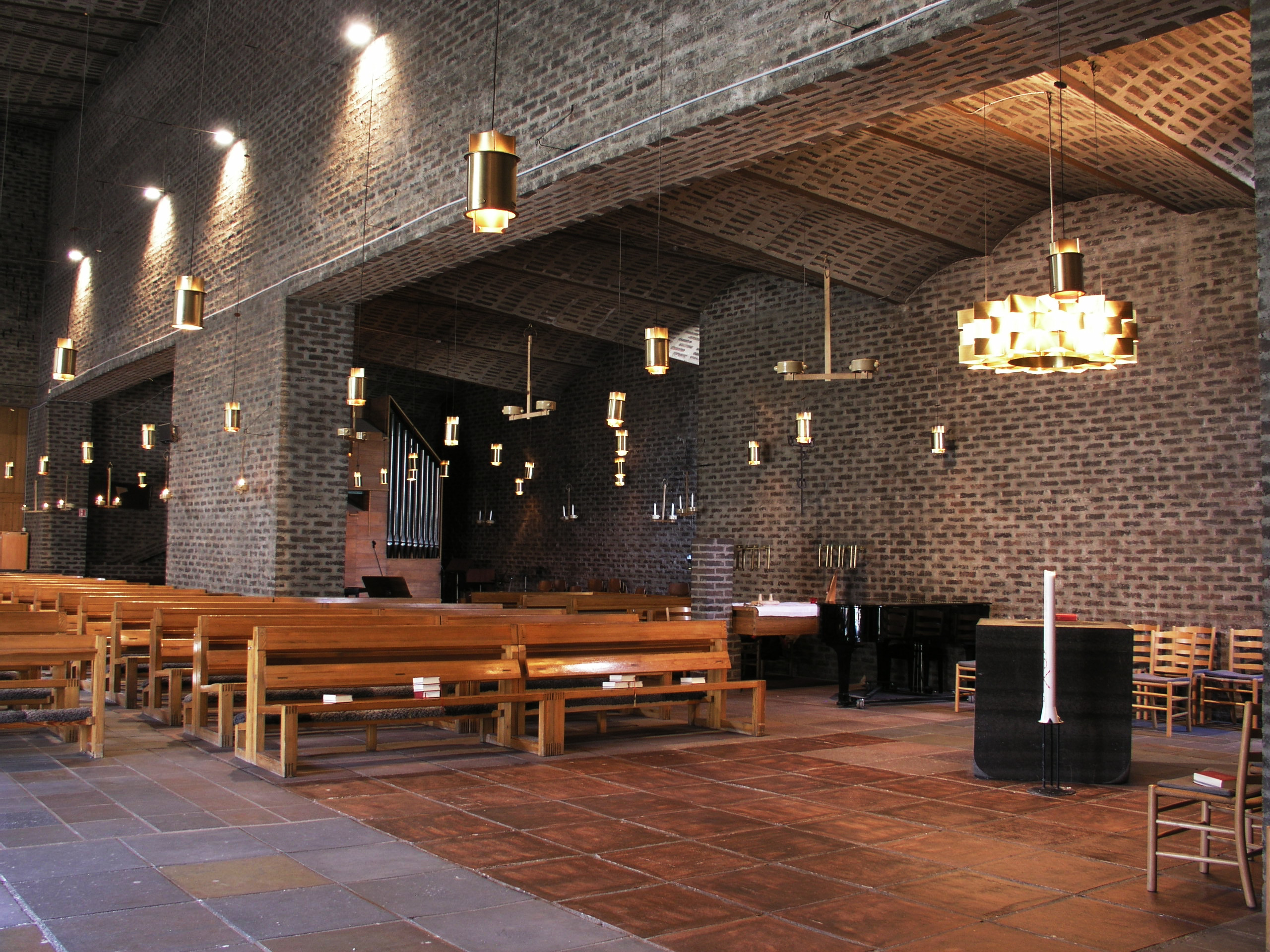
View towards nave

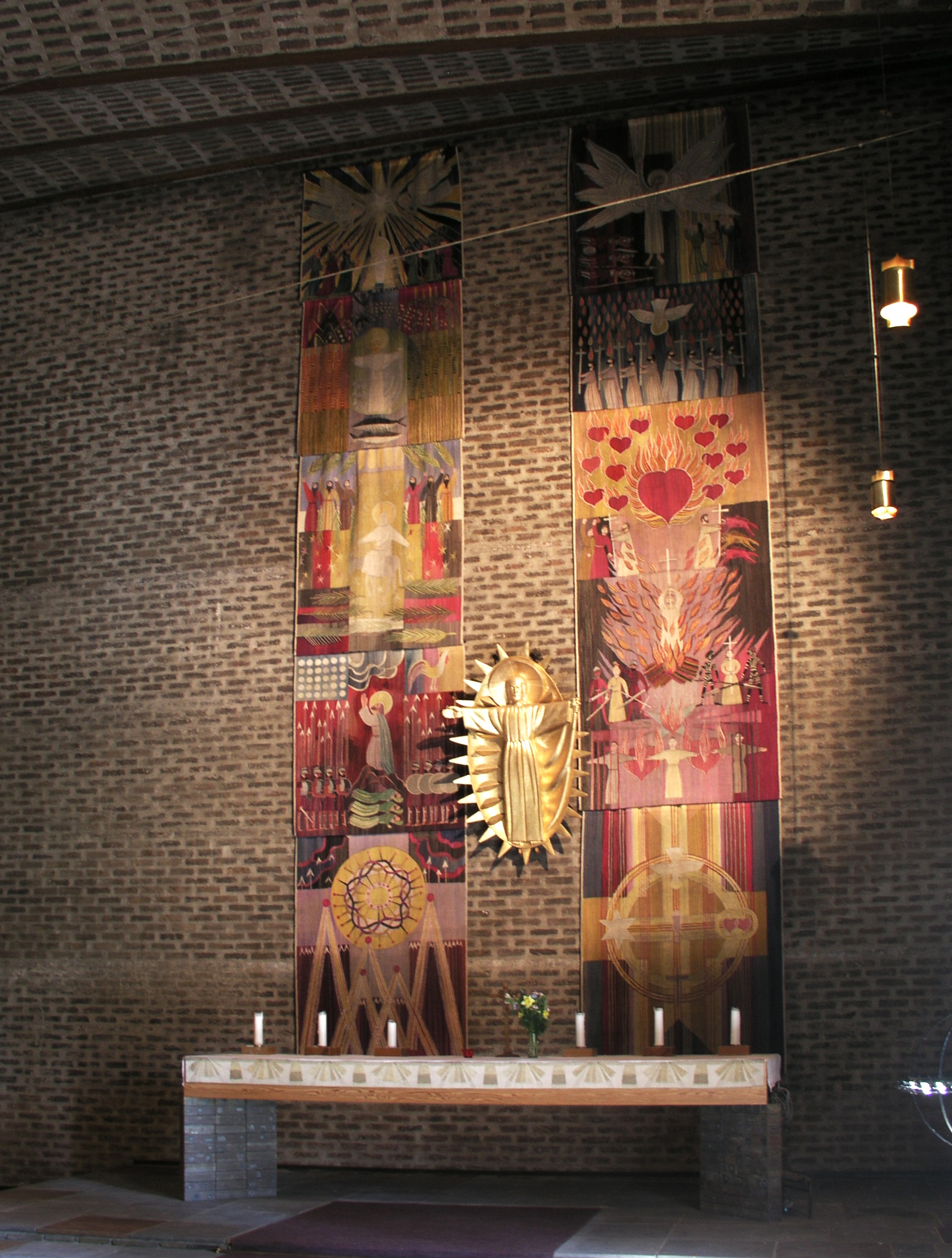
Altar

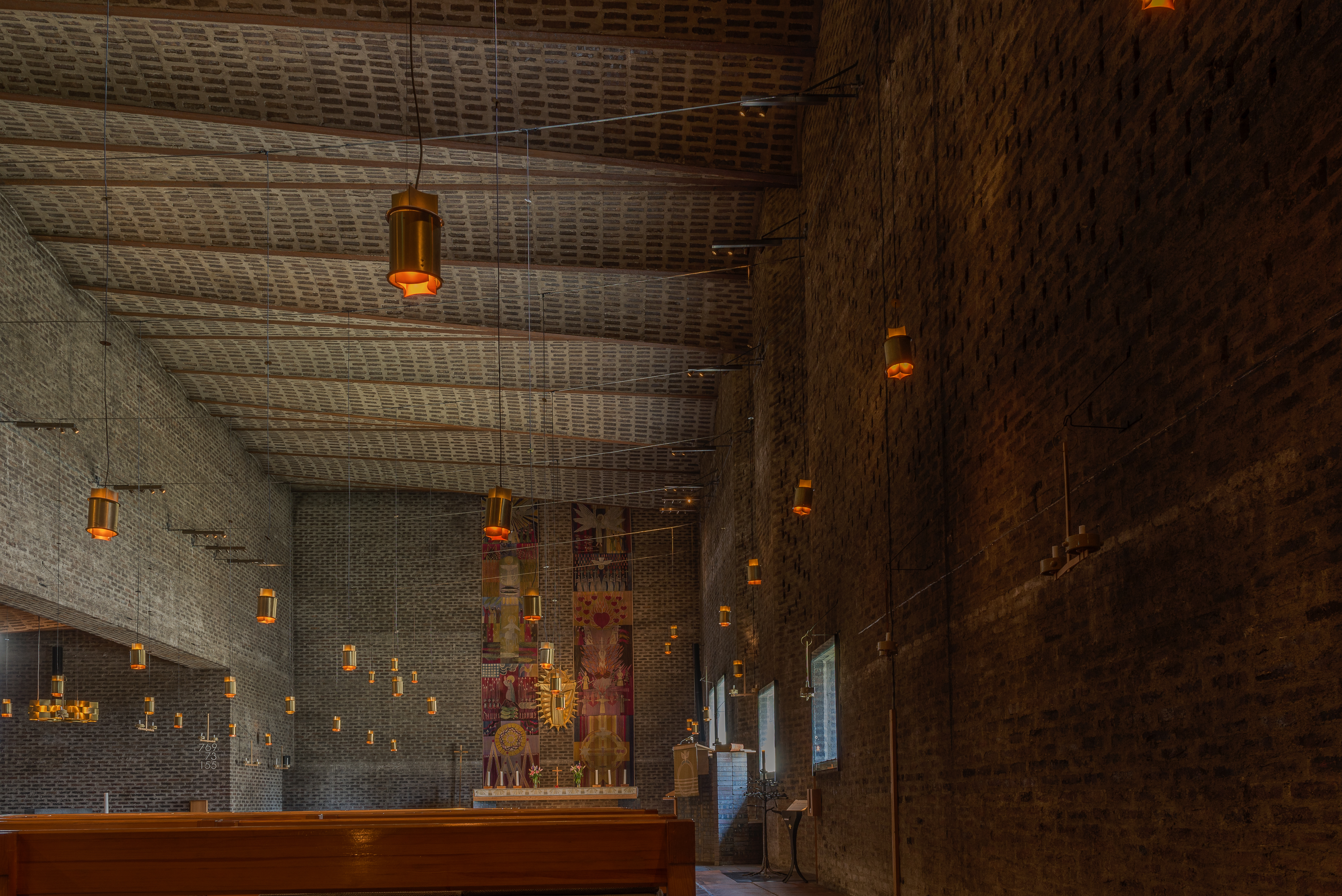
Interior view
