= Skrubba =

Coordinates: 59°14′15.79″N 18°10′37.62″E

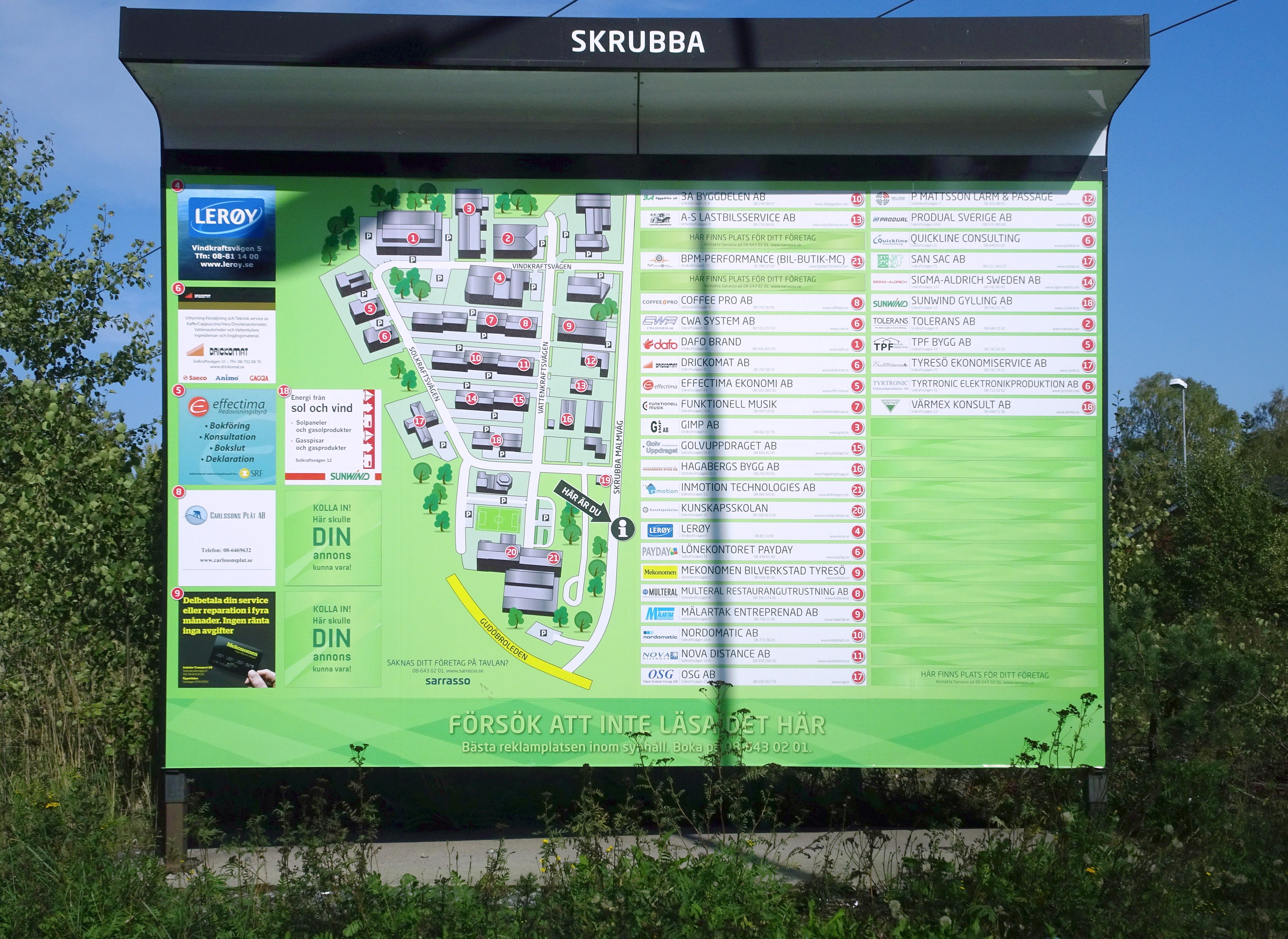
Skrubbatriangeln

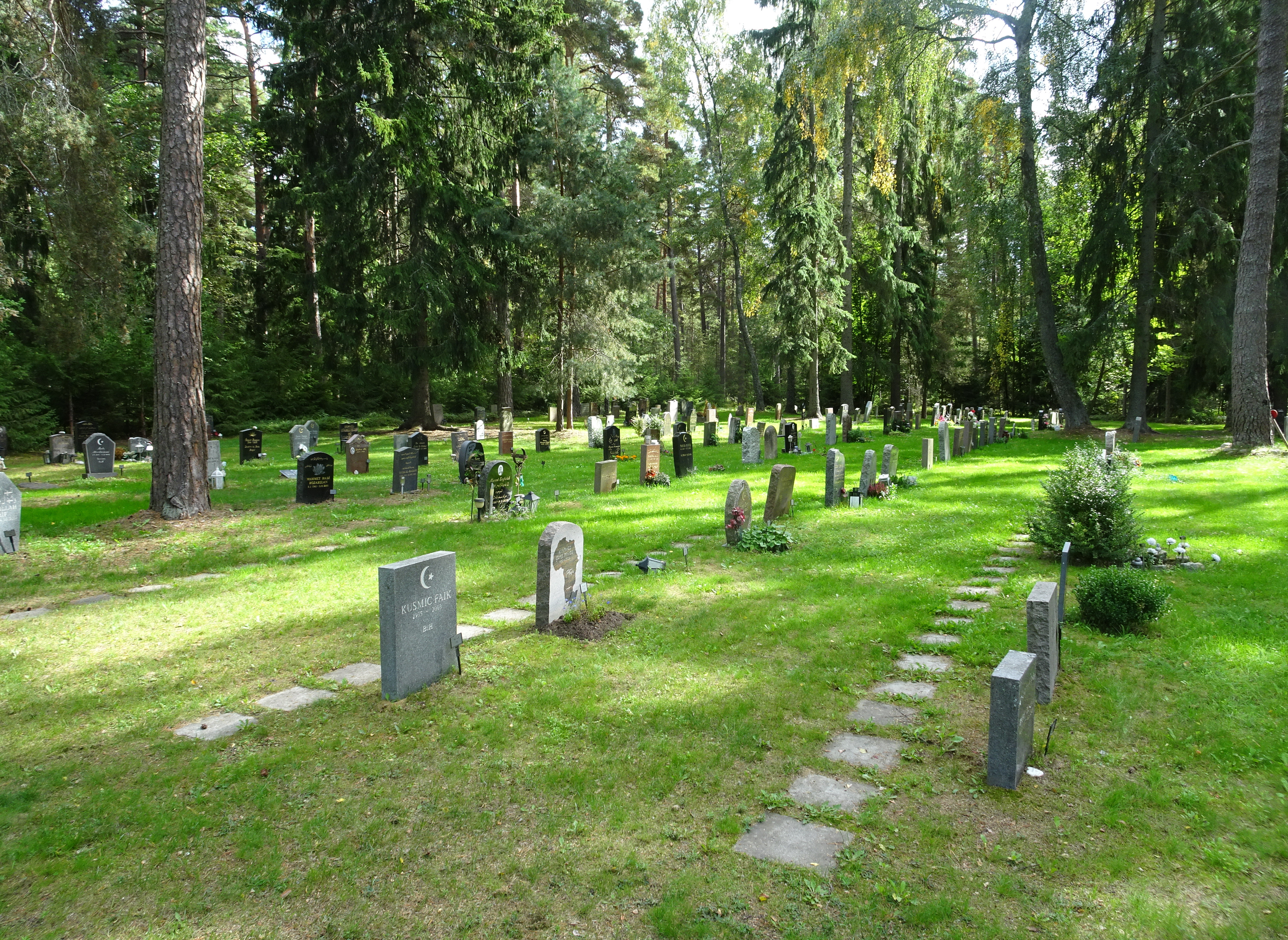
Strandkyrkogården

Skrubba is a district (Swedish: stadsdel) in the Skarpnäck borough of Stockholm, Sweden.

Skrubba borders in the north to the district of Flaten, in the east to Trollbäcken in Tyresö municipality and in the west and south to Lake Drevviken. As of 2017, Skrubba has 14 permanent residents. Skrubbatriangeln is an industrial area on the eastern end of the district, next to the border to Tyresö Municipality. The area was inaugurated in 1987.

Strandkyrkogården is a cemetery which was inaugurated in 1996. The area encompasses 25 hectares of land that alternates between open parkland and enclosed forest areas. An allotment garden is near to the shore of lake Drevviken. Except for Strandkyrkogården, the western parts of Skrubba are part of Flaten nature reserve (Flatens naturreservat).
