= Kärrtorp metro station =

Stockholm Metro station

Kärrtorp
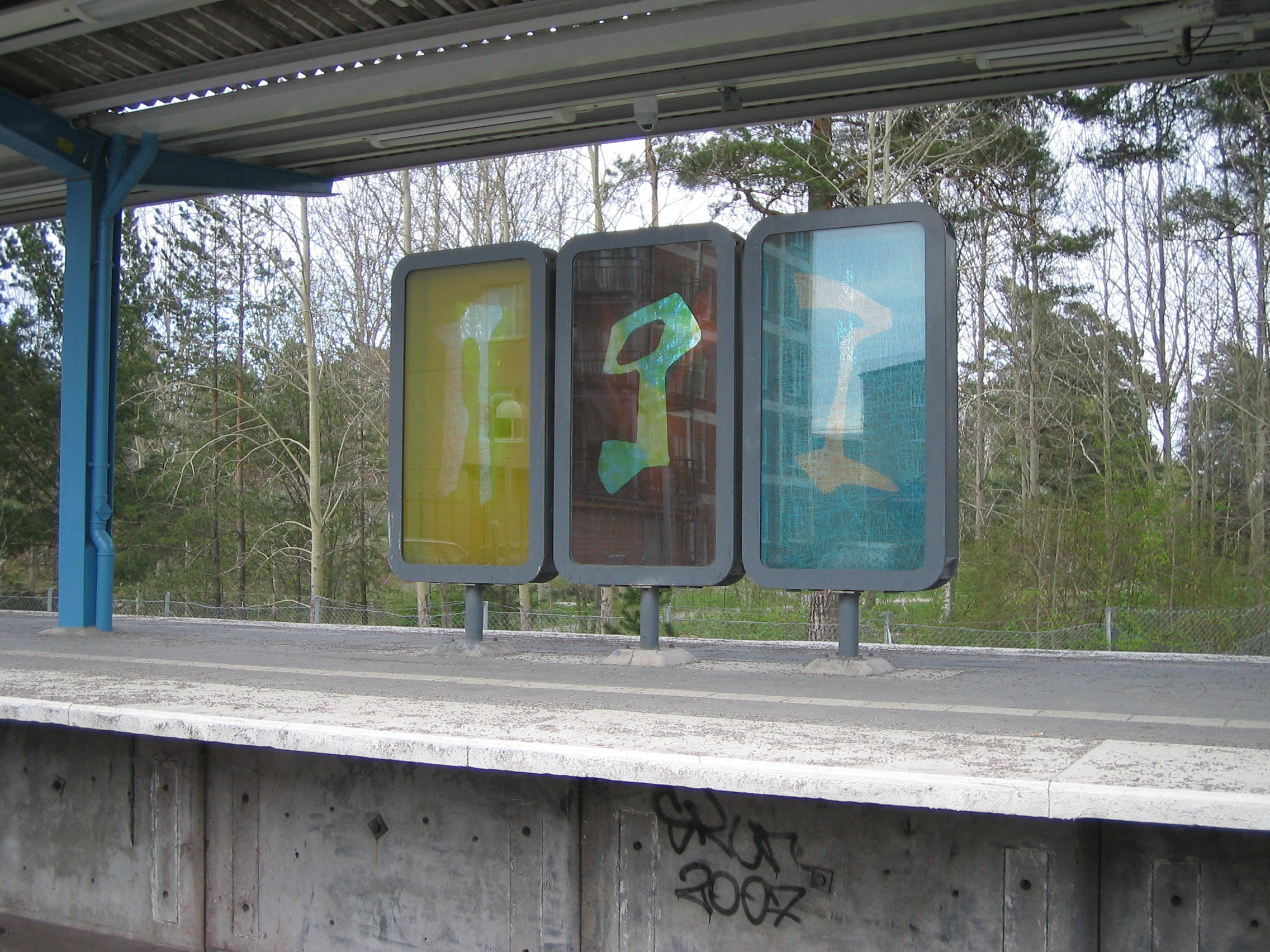

General information
- Coordinates: 59°17′04″N 18°06′51″E
- System: Stockholm Metro station
- Owner: Storstockholms Lokaltrafik
- Platforms: 1 island platform
- Tracks: 2

Construction
- Structure type: Elevated
- Accessible: Yes

Other information
- Station code: KÄT

History
- Opened: 18 November 1958; 67 years ago

Passengers
- 2019: 4,200 boarding per weekday

Services
| Preceding station | Stockholm Metro | Following station |
|---|---|---|
| Björkhagen towards Åkeshov | Line 17 | Bagarmossen towards Skarpnäck |
Location
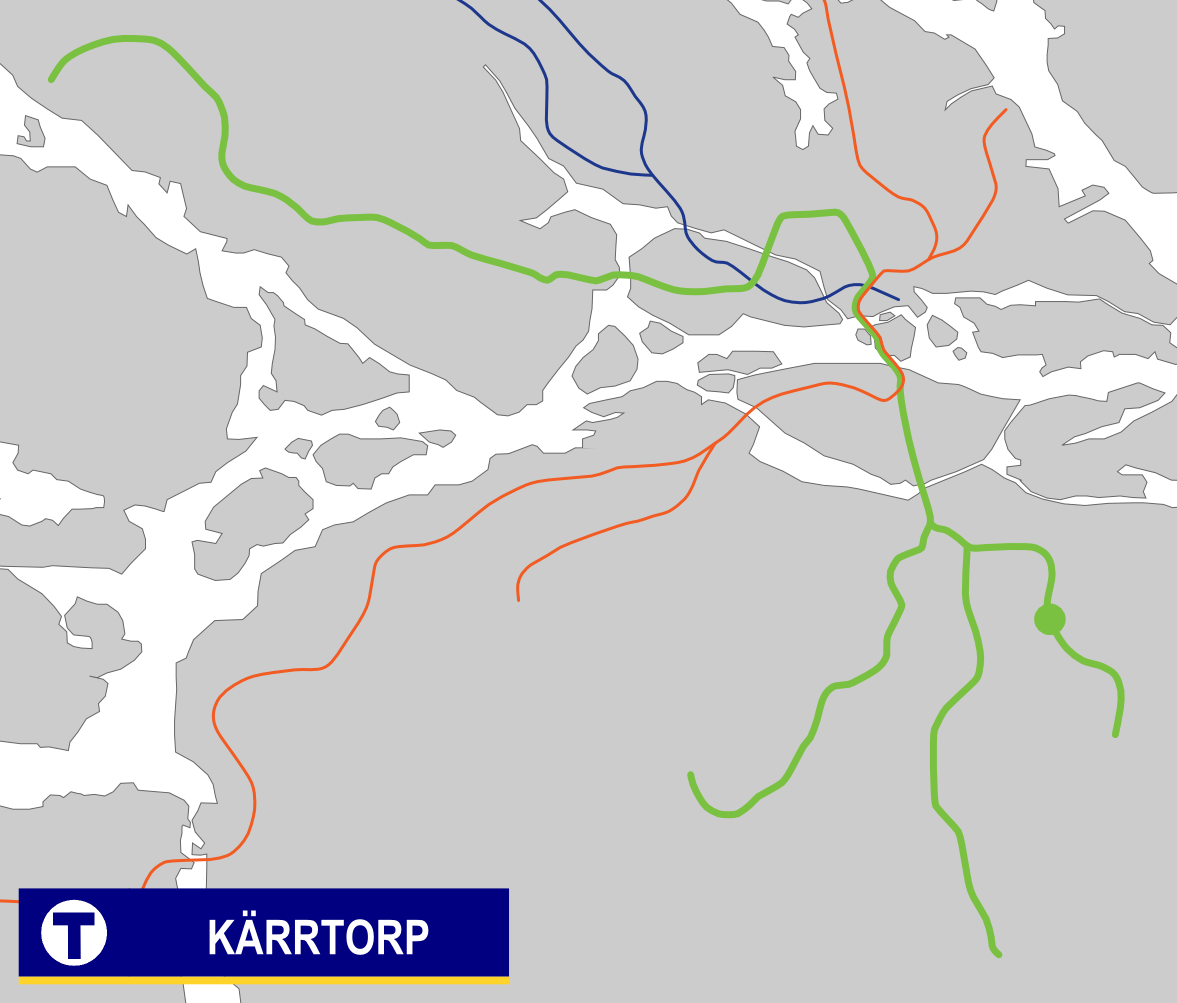

Kärrtorp metro station is a station on the Green Line of the Stockholm Metro, located in Kärrtorp, Söderort. The station was inaugurated on 18 November 1958 as a part of the extension from Hammarbyhöjden to Bagarmossen. The distance to Slussen is 5.5 km (3.4 mi).
