= Sigurd Lewerentz =

Swedish architect

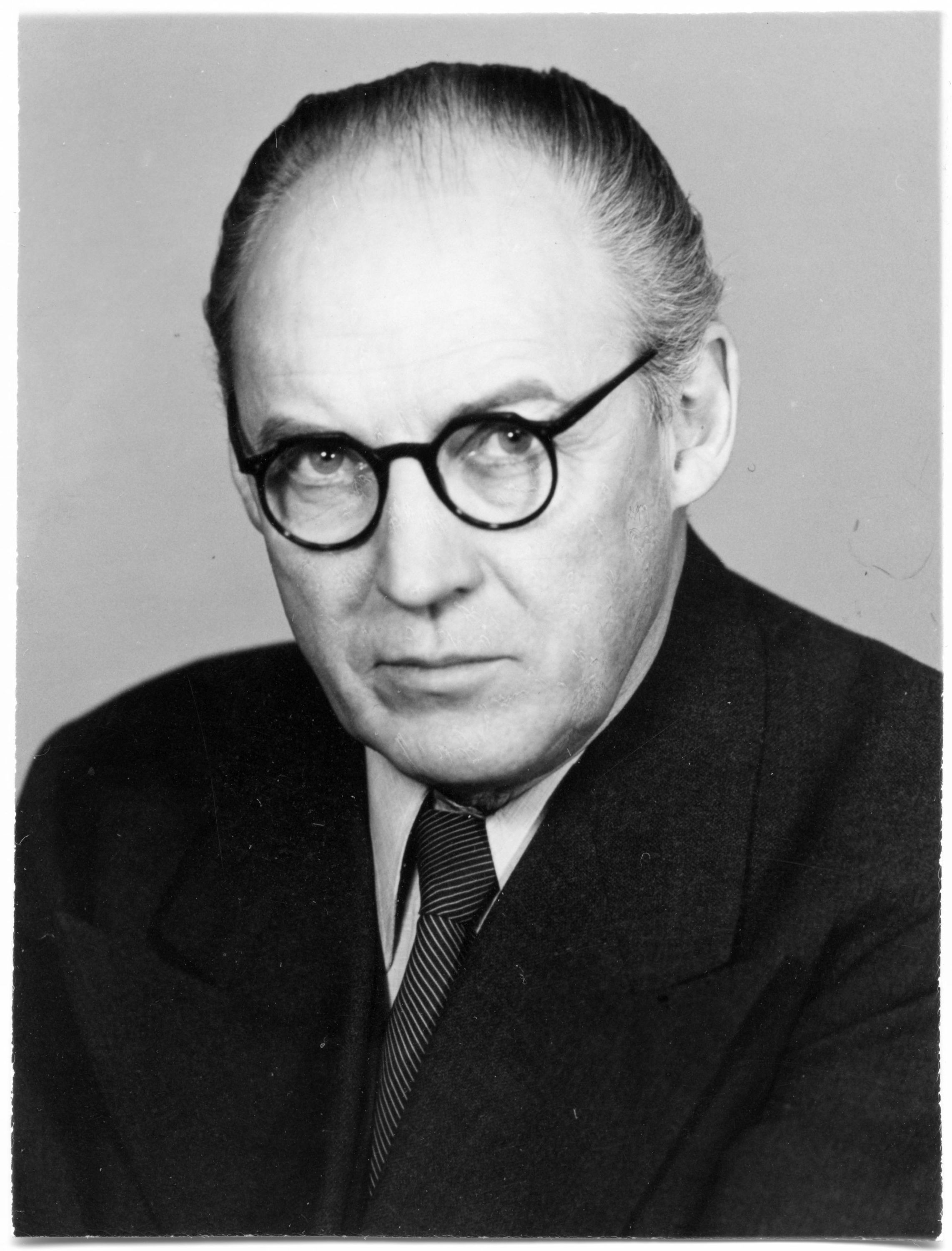
- Born: 29 July 1885; Bjärtrå, Sweden
- Died: 29 December 1975 (aged 90); Lund, Sweden
- Occupation: Architect

Sigurd Lewerentz (29 July 1885 – 29 December 1975) was a Swedish architect.

== Biography ==
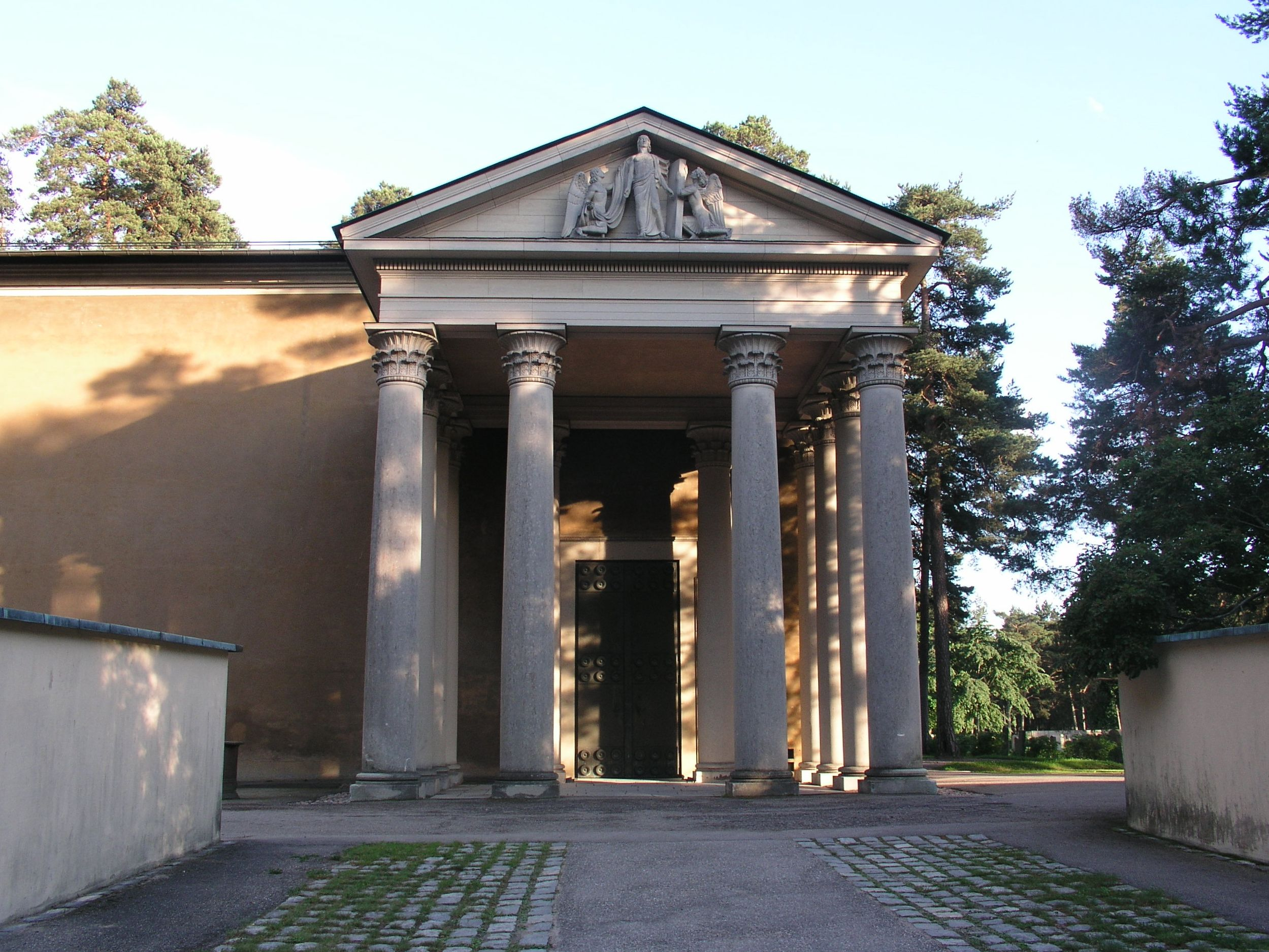
Resurrection Chapel at Skogskyrkogården

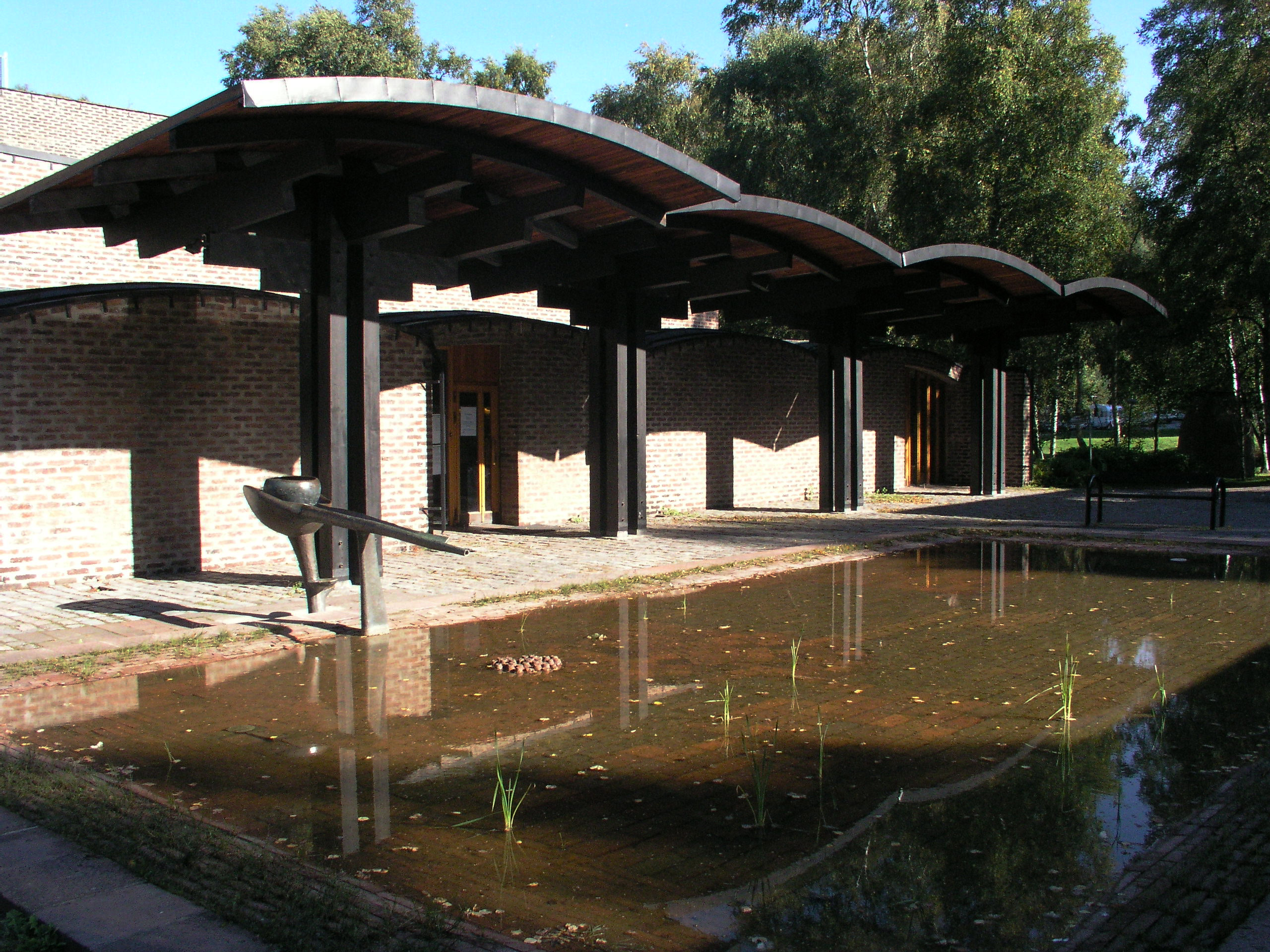
Church of St. Mark at Björkhagen

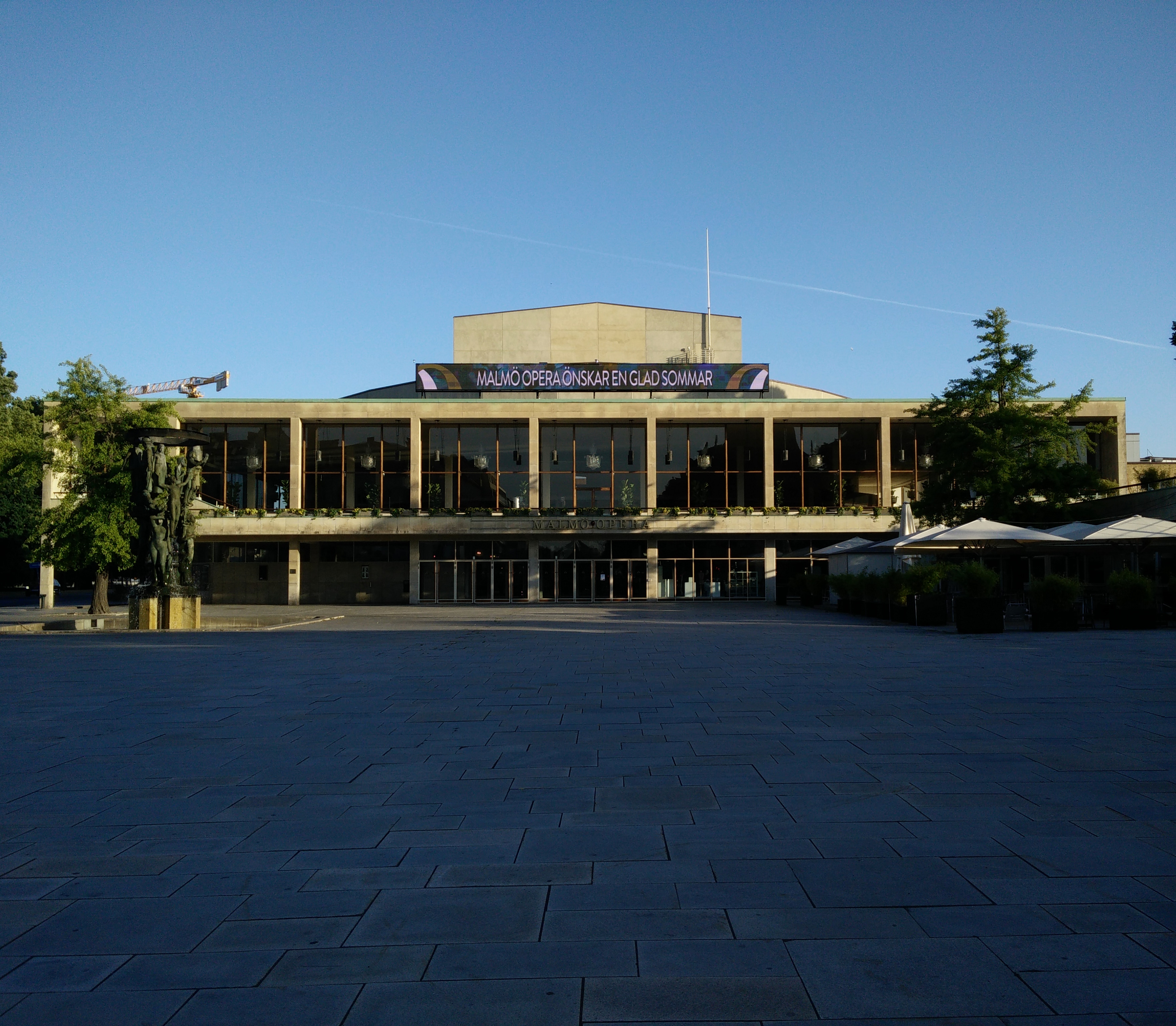
Malmö Opera and Music Theatre

Lewerentz was born at Sandö in the parish of Bjärtrå in Västernorrland County, Sweden. He was the son of Gustaf Adolf Lewerentz and Hedvig Mathilda Holmgren. He initially trained as a mechanical engineer at the Chalmers University of Technology in Gothenburg (1905–8). Later he took up an architectural apprenticeship in Germany. He studied with Westman, Östberg and Tengbom.

He first opened his own architectural office in Stockholm in 1911 and became associated with the architect Gunnar Asplund (1885–1940). Together they made a winning entry for the Stockholm South (Woodland) Cemetery (Skogskyrkogården) competition of 1914–15. This project was implemented initially by both architects, however, the latter stages were done by Asplund alone. He and Asplund were appointed as the main architects for the Stockholm International Exhibition (1930) but afterward, Lewerentz became disillusioned, turning away from architecture for many years; from 1940 he ran a factory producing windows and other architectural fittings of his own design.

Between 1933 and 1944 Lewerentz, together with his colleagues Erik Lallerstedt and David Helldén, created what is regarded of one of the masterpieces of functionalist architecture, Malmö Opera and Music Theatre (Malmö Opera och Musikteater). The foyer is considered of particular beauty, with its open surfaces and beautiful marble staircases and it is adorned with a number of works of art by artists such as Carl Milles and Isaac Grünewald. He was awarded the Prince Eugen Medal for architecture in 1950.

In the last decade of his life he designed two churches, St. Mark's at Björkhagen in Stockholm (1956) and St. Peter's at Klippan in Scania (1963–66), which revived his career in architecture. St. Peter's at Klippan sits in a suburban setting on the periphery of this small town in southern Sweden. The orientation of the church is correct, with the altar standing opposite the west doors. It is square in shape, suggesting a more intimate ritual in the tradition of circonstantes (standing in a circle), which harkens back to early Christianity. This was the religious equivalent of the search for the essential and the primitive, strongly evident in both of Lewerentz's later churches. These characteristics are expressed beautifully in the detailing of the buildings, the choice of materials, the quality of light and the spatial articulation.

He continued to work at competition proposals and furniture designs until shortly before his death in Lund, Sweden during 1975.

His total output was small but of very high quality. In an obituary published in The Architectural Review, James Codrington praises Lewerentz's buildings for their "daring, often rugged use of materials" and their "indefinable atmosphere" and "sense of place."

== Bibliography ==
=== Books ===
- Björkquist, Karin and Sébastien Corbari, editors (2021). Sigurd Lewerentz, Pure Aesthetics. St Mark’s Church. Zürich: Park Books AG, 2021. (ISBN 9783038602439)
- Foote, Jonathan, Hansjörg Göritz, Matthew Hall and Nathan Matteson, editors (2021). Lewerentz Fragments. Barcelona: ACTAR, 2021. (ISBN 9781638400028)
- Long, Kieran, Johan Örn, and Mikael Andersson, editors (2021). Sigurd Lewerentz. Architect of Death and Life. Zürich: Park Books AG, 2021. (ISBN 9783038602323)
- Flora, Nicola, Paolo Giardiello and Gennaro Postiglione, editors (2002). Sigurd Lewerentz, 1885-1975. Milan: Electa Architecture, 2002. (ISBN 9781904313052)
- Blundell Jones, Peter (2002). Modern Architecture through case studies. Oxford: Architectural Press, 2002. (ISBN 9780750638050)
- Constant, Caroline (1994). The Woodland Cemetery: Toward a Spiritual Landscape. Stockholm: Byggförlaget, 1994. (ISBN 9789179880606)
- Ahlin, Janne. (1985) Sigurd Lewerentz, architect 1885-1975. Stockholm: Byggförlaget, 1985. (ISBN 9789185194636). Reedited in: Ahlin, Janne. (2014) Sigurd Lewerentz, architect 1885-1975. Zürich: Park Books AG, 2014. (ISBN 9783906027487)

=== Peer-Reviewed Journal Articles ===
- Campo-Ruiz, Ingrid (2016). The Separating and Connecting Nature of Architectural Limits: Sigurd Lewerentz and Site. Esempi di Architettura 3/1 (2016): 41-51. ISSN 2035-7982.
- Campo-Ruiz, Ingrid (2015). Equality in Death: Sigurd Lewerentz and the Planning of Malmö Eastern Cemetery 1916-1973. Planning Perspectives 30/4: 639-657 ISSN 1460-1176 DOI: 10.1080/02665433.2015.1048524.
- Campo-Ruiz, Ingrid (2015). From Tradition to Innovation: Lewerentz’s Designs of Ritual Spaces in Sweden, 1914-1966. The Journal of Architecture 20/1 (2015): 73-91. ISBN 978-1-138-80283-4. DOI:10.1080/13602365.2015.1009483.
- Campo-Ruiz, Ingrid (2015). Malmö Eastern Cemetery and Lewerentz’s Critical Approach to Monumentality. Studies in the History of Gardens and Designed Landscapes 35/4 (2015):328-344. ISSN 1460-1176. DOI: 10.1080/14601176.2015.1079422.
- Campo-Ruiz, Ingrid (2015). Construction as a Prototype: the Novel Approach by Sigurd Lewerentz to Using Building Materials, Especially in Walls and Windows, 1920-72. Construction History 30 Nov (2015): 67-86. ISSN 0267-7768.
- Campo-Ruiz, Ingrid (2013). Less or More? The Construction of Lewerentz’s Kiosk in the Malmö Cemetery. Progreso, Proyecto, Arquitectura 8 (2013): 132-147. ISSN 2171-6897. DOI: http://dx.doi.org/10.12795/ppa.2013.i8.09
- Recording drawings by Raphael Zuber and Helena Brobäck with photographs by Hans Cogne and text by Christoph Wieser in Werk, Bauen + Wohnen 9/2005
- Hart, Vaughan (1996). ‘Sigurd Lewerentz and the ‘Half-Open Door’’, Architectural History: Journal of the Society of Architectural Historians of Great Britain, vol.36, pp.181-196.

=== Doctoral Theses ===
- Campo Ruiz, Ingrid. Lewerentz in Malmo: Intersections between Architecture and Landscape. (2015). Doctoral Thesis, Escuela Técnica Superior de Arquitectura de Madrid, Universidad Politécnica de Madrid.
- Fernández Elorza, Héctor. Asplund versus Lewerentz. (2014). Doctoral Thesis, Escuela Técnica Superior de Arquitectura de Madrid, Universidad Politécnica de Madrid.
- Ridderstedt, Lars. (1998). Adversus populum: Peter Celsings och Sigurd Lewerentz sakralarkitektur 1945-1975 : (the religious architecture of Peter Celsing and Sigurd Lewerentz 1945-1975). Uppsala: Uppsala University, 1998.

== Exhibitions ==
- Sigurd Lewerentz. Architect of Death and Life. 1 October 2021 - 28 August 2022, ArkDes, Stockholm
- Sigurd Lewerentz, 1885 - 1975. Stockholm: Arkitektuurmuseet, 1985.
