= December 2013 Stockholm riots =

Clashes between far-right rioters, leftist activists, and Swedish authority

2013 Stockholm Kärrtorp riots
- Date: 15 December 2013
- Location: Kärrtorp, Stockholm, Sweden
- Methods: Rioting; assault; stabbing
- Result: Dozens of rioters arrested, police regain control of areas affected.

Parties
Swedish Police Authority; Swedish Security Service	Anti-fascists	Rioters: Neo-Nazis; Swedish Resistance Movement; White youths

Number
	500–800	40

Casualties
- Injuries: 4

On 15 December 2013, violent clashes took place during an anti-racist demonstration in the Kärrtorp district of Stockholm, Sweden. The demonstration was organised by Linje 17, its name referring to the Stockholm Metro Line 17 that runs through Kärrtorp. The demonstration was violently attacked by neo-Nazis. Two demonstrators and two police officers were injured and hospitalised.

== Events ==
Amid increasing racist activity in Kärrtorp including racist graffiti on a local school, the newly created Linje 17 organised a demonstration against this. About 200 people participated in the protest on Sunday 15 December. Only six police officers were put in place for the event.

A group of about forty men belonging to the Swedish Resistance Movement (Svenska Motståndsrörelsen), armed with brass knuckles and iron rods, interrupted and attacked the demonstration. They threw stones, bottles and fireworks. Members of the far-left Antifascistisk Aktion and Revolutionary Front groups who took part in the demonstration went into opposition against the neo-Nazis.

The chants of "Adolf Hitler" and "Sieg Heil" were audible. The Swedish Resistance Movement attackers were forced to retreat the scene when police gained control of the trouble.

== Aftermath ==
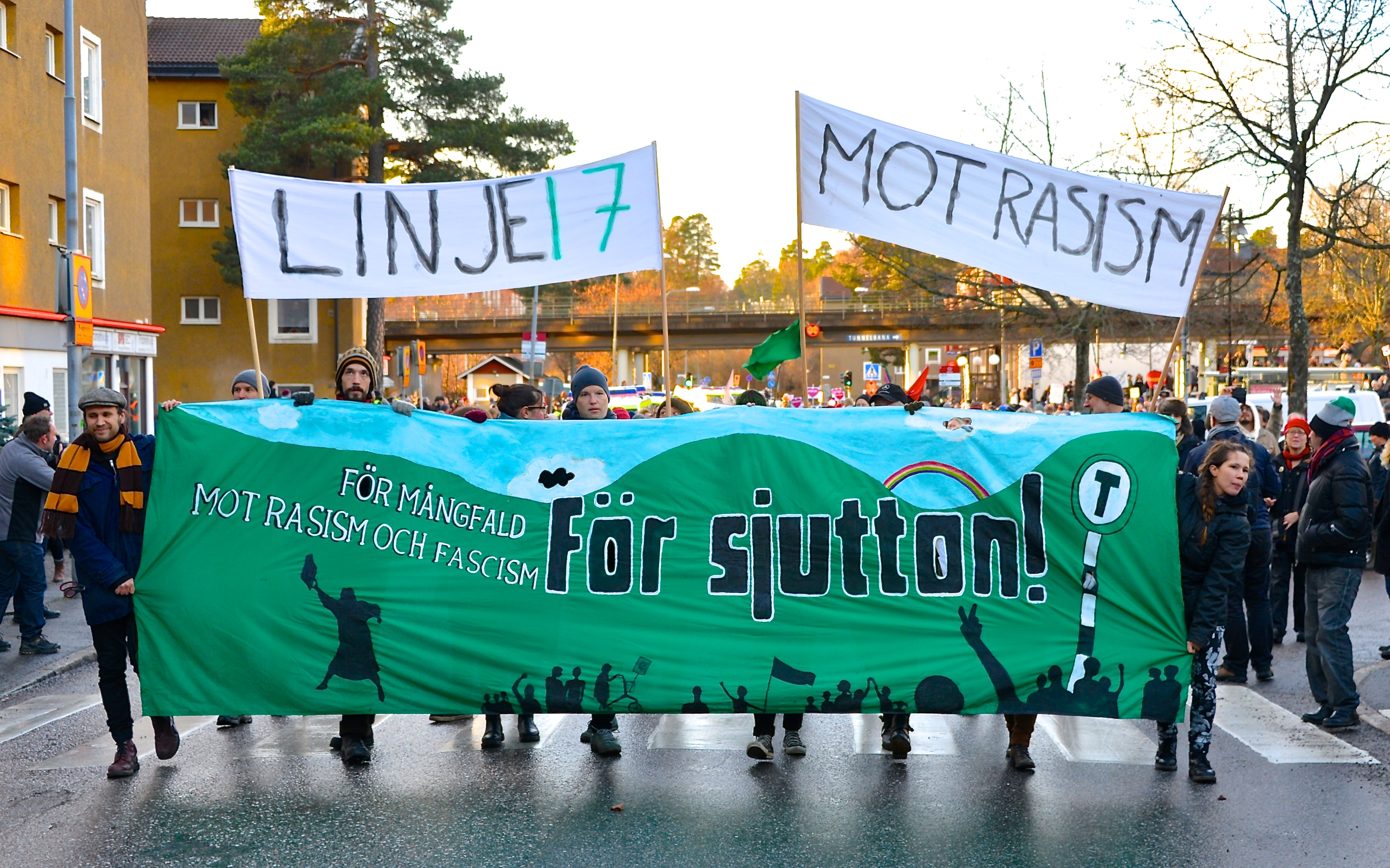
The second demonstrations of Kärrtorp, attended by thousands

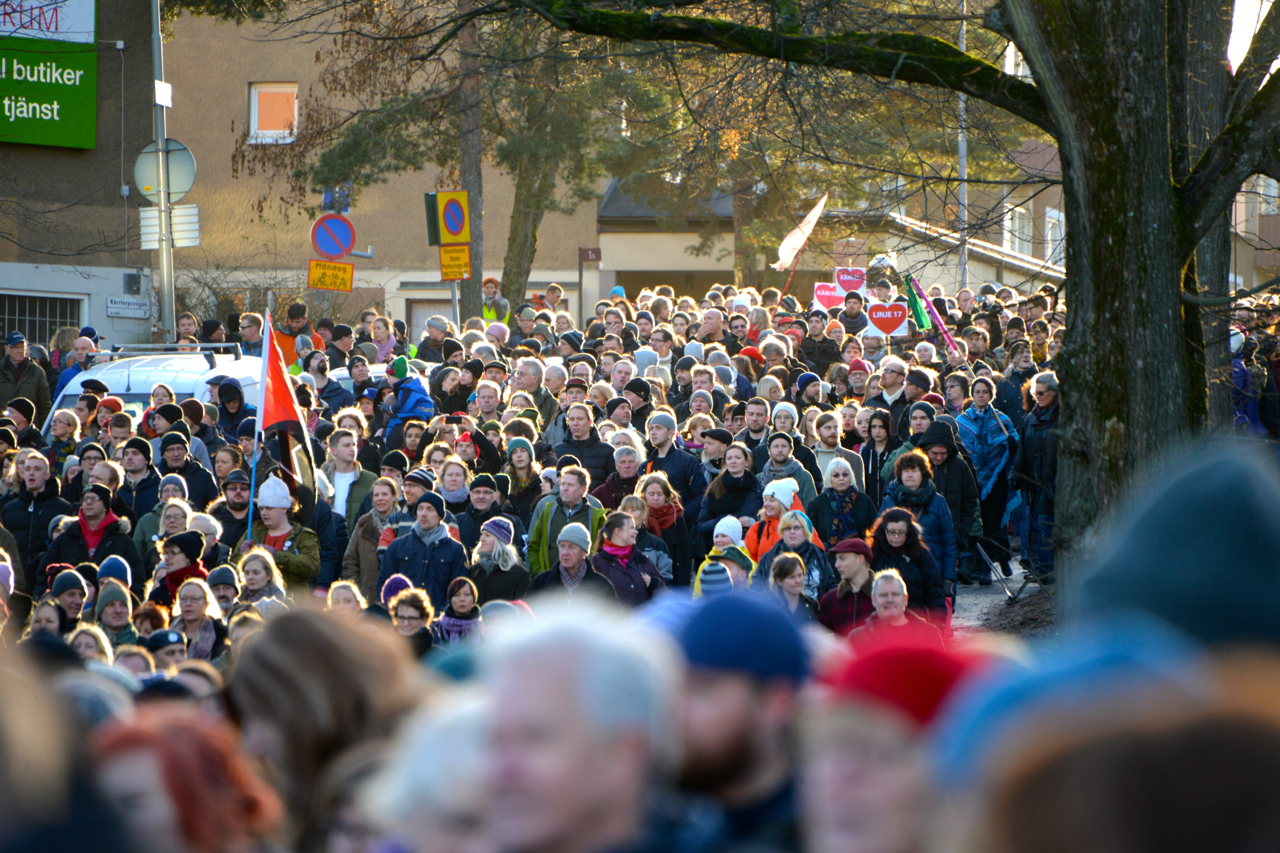
The second demonstrations of Kärrtorp, attended by thousands

Around 28 people were arrested immediately after the incident.

In response to the trouble, Linje 17 organised a second anti-racist demonstration a week later on 22 December. 16,000 people participated, including many local and well-known artists and parliamentary figures.

The word "kärrtorpa" was added to the 2014 Språkrådets nyordslista meaning "opposing to the spread of Nazi propaganda and Nazi violence". The world list is published yearly by the Swedish Language Council and contain new words in the Swedish language.

=== Convictions ===
Twenty three neo-Nazis were convicted of violence. A far-left activist received a prison sentence in April 2014 for six and a half years for stabbing a neo-Nazi in the back. He was sentenced for attempted manslaughter, making illegal threats, illegal rioting, and unlawful possession of a knife.

== See also ==
- Charlottesville car attack
