= Björkhagen metro station =

Stockholm Metro station

Björkhagen
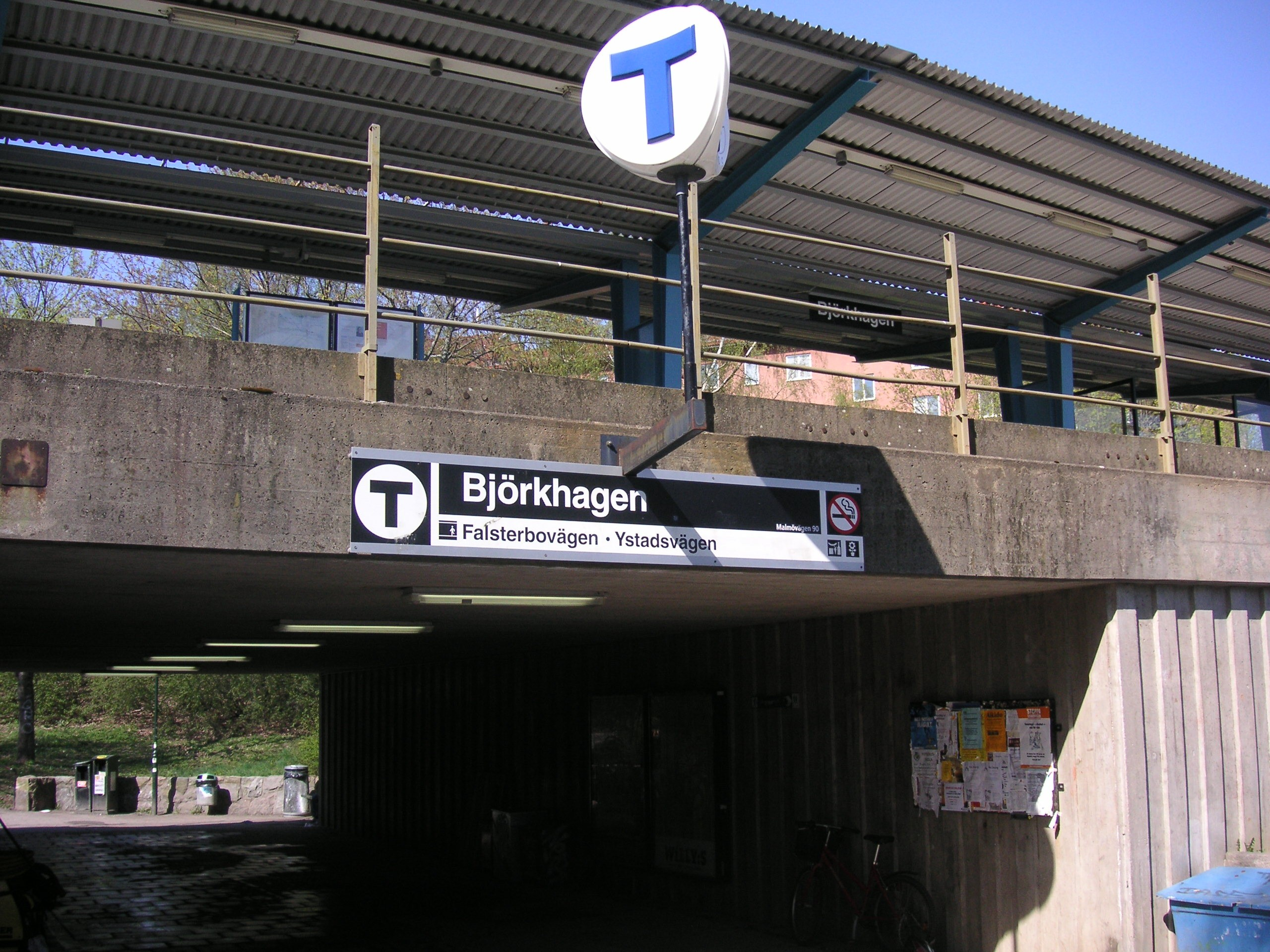

General information
- Coordinates: 59°17′26″N 18°06′56″E
- System: Stockholm Metro station
- Owner: Storstockholms Lokaltrafik
- Platforms: 1 island platform
- Tracks: 2

Construction
- Structure type: Elevated
- Accessible: Yes

Other information
- Station code: BJH

History
- Opened: 18 November 1958; 67 years ago

Passengers
- 2019: 3,800 boarding per weekday

Services
Preceding station	Stockholm Metro	Following station
Hammarbyhöjden towards Åkeshov	Line 17	Kärrtorp towards Skarpnäck
Location
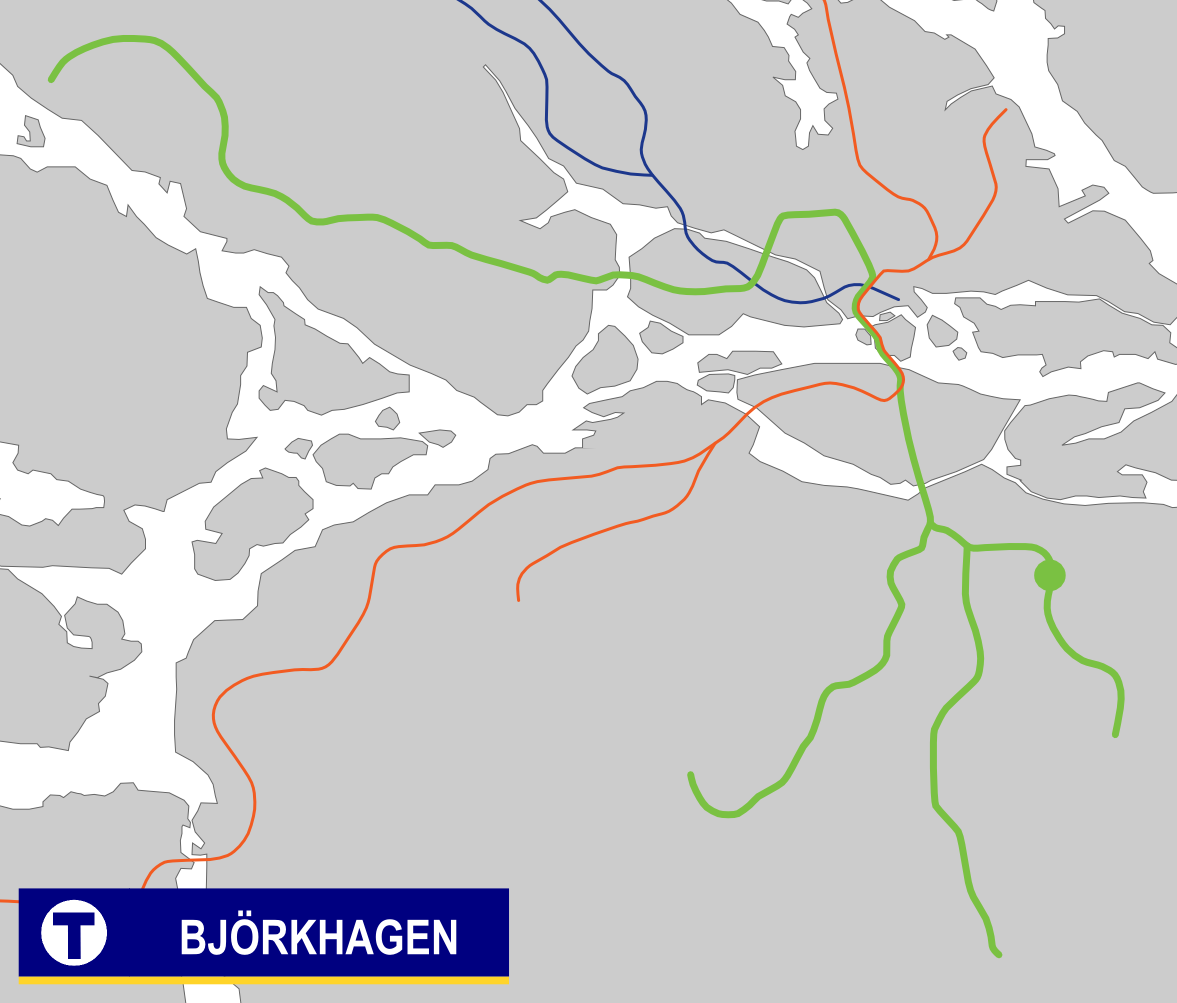

Björkhagen metro station is a station on the Green Line of the Stockholm Metro, located in Björkhagen, Söderort. The station was inaugurated on 18 November 1958 as a part of the extension from Hammarbyhöjden to Bagarmossen. The distance to Slussen is 4.8 km (3.0 mi).
