= Hammarbyhöjden metro station =

Stockholm Metro station

Hammarbyhöjden
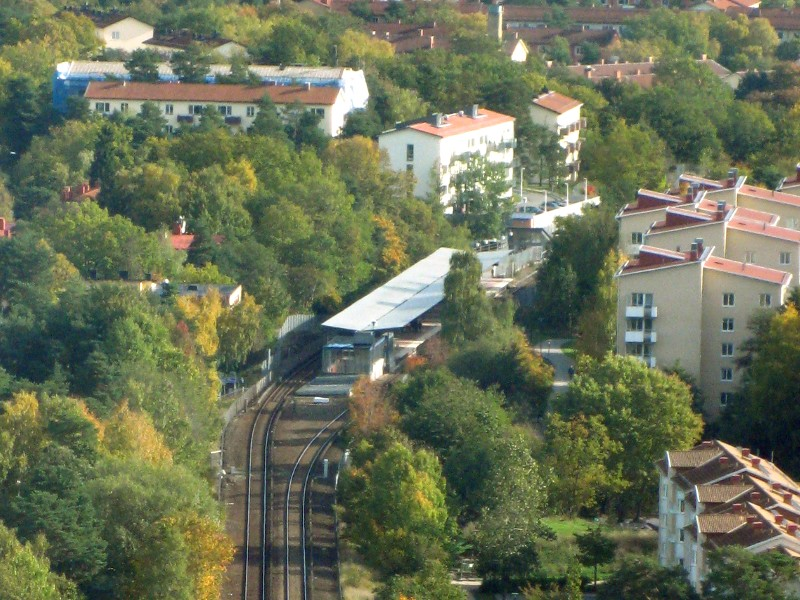

General information
- Coordinates: 59°17′41.2″N 18°06′12″E
- System: Stockholm Metro station
- Owner: Storstockholms Lokaltrafik
- Platforms: 1 island platform
- Tracks: 2

Construction
- Structure type: Elevated
- Accessible: Yes

Other information
- Station code: HYÖ

History
- Opened: 17 April 1958; 68 years ago

Passengers
- 2019: 4,300 boarding per weekday

Services
Preceding station	Stockholm Metro	Following station
Skärmarbrink towards Åkeshov	Line 17	Björkhagen towards Skarpnäck
Location
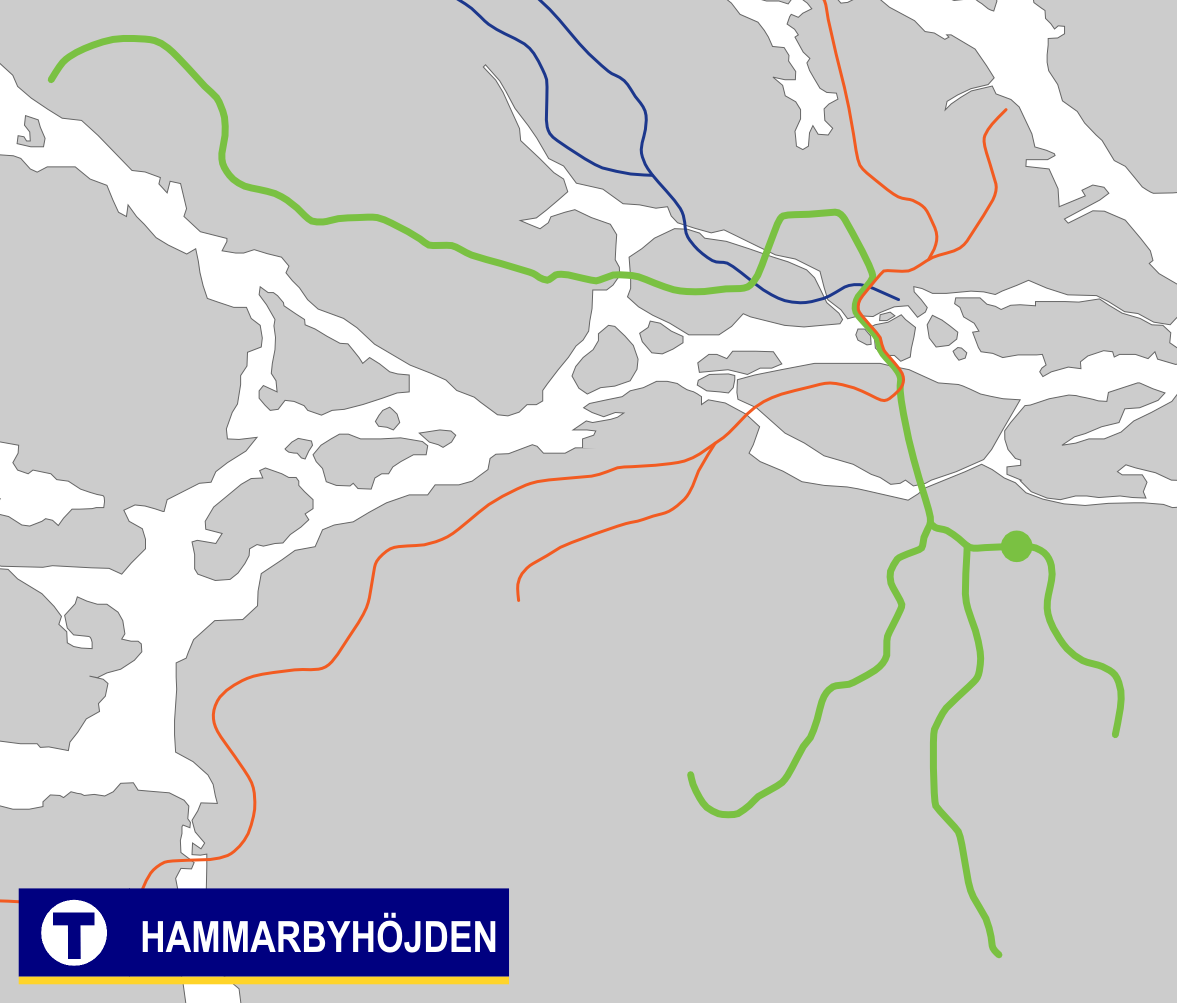

Hammarbyhöjden metro station is a station on the Green Line of the Stockholm Metro, located in Hammarbyhöjden, Söderort. The station was inaugurated on 17 April 1958 as the east terminus of a one-station extension from Skärmarbrink. On 18 November 1958 an extension to Bagarmossen was opened. The distance to Slussen is 3.8 km (2.4 mi).

The station is located above ground and has two entrances. The north entrance is located near Finn Malmgrens Plan. The south entrance is accessed from Ulricehamnsvägen.

The decoration of the station is the smallest of the Metro system: A 30x40 cm brick embossment depicting a goat.
