= Flaten (district) =

Urban district in Stockholm, Sweden

Coordinates: 59°15′30″N 18°9′30″E

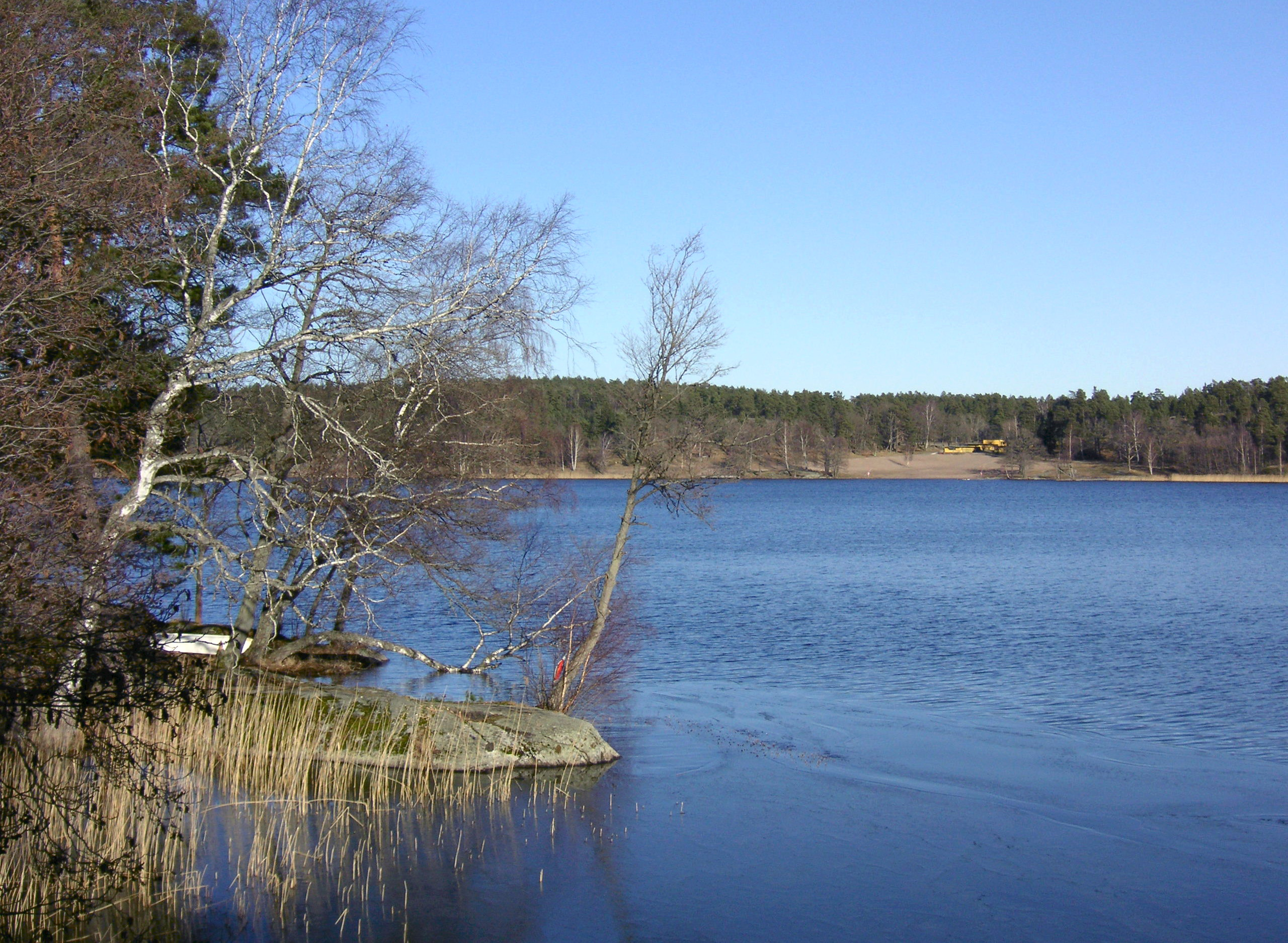

Flaten is a district (Swedish: stadsdel) in Skarpnäck borough, Stockholm, Sweden. Flaten had eight inhabitants as of December 31, 2006.

Flaten has no permanent housing, most of the district is part of the Flaten nature reserve.
