= Orhem =

Urban district in Stockholm, Sweden

Coordinates: 59°14′48″N 18°08′15″E

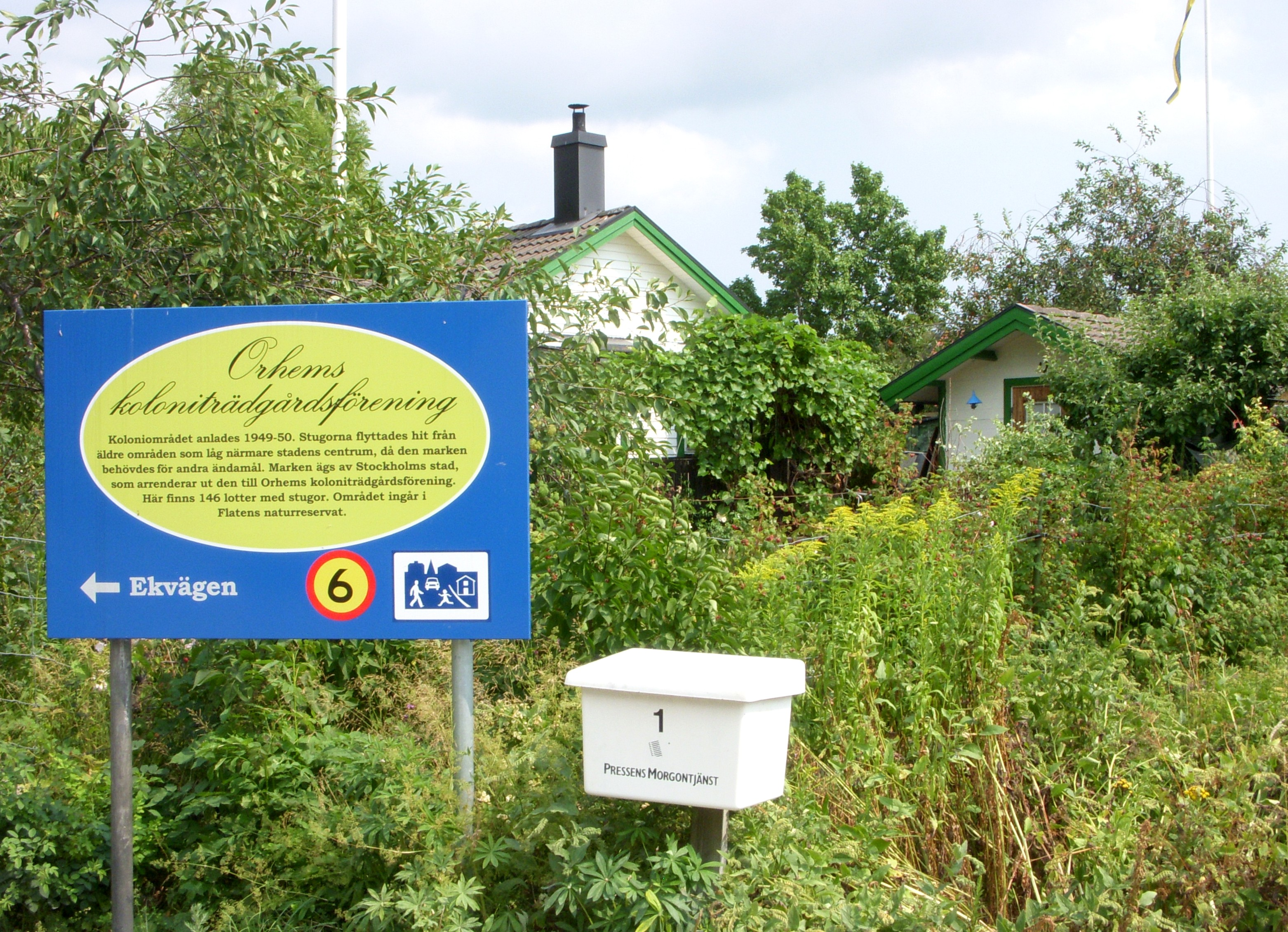
Allotments in Orhem in 2010.

Orhem is a district (Swedish: stadsdel) in Skarpnäck borough, Stockholm, Sweden. Orhem has 357 inhabitants as of the latest information (year unavailable).

Orhem has a small number of permanent housing. There are several allotment gardens in Orhem. A large part of Orhem is in the Flaten nature reserve.
