= Revolutionary Front (Sweden) =

Far-left political movement in Sweden

- Formation: 2002
- Dissolved: 2015
- Type: Militant far-left

The Revolutionary Front (Swedish: Revolutionära fronten) was a far-left extremist political and militant network in Sweden. The goal of the RF was to dismantle the current society through a revolution and create a socialist society. The group fought against fascism, racism, sexism and capitalism, and campaigned through violent means.

== Organization and activities ==
The Revolutionary Front was formed in 2002 by Joel Bjurströmer Almgren and others. It was formed after the Gothenburg riots in 2001 and had connections to the Swedish AFA but was different in that it was a strict organization and not a network. The organisation's strategy and tactics were inspired by the British Anti-Fascist Action movement. In 2014 Almgren was sentenced to five years in prison for stabbing a neo-Nazi in the back during the violent December 2013 Stockholm riots. In September 2015 the organisation dissolved.
