= Enskededalen =

Coordinates: 59°17′N 18°06′E

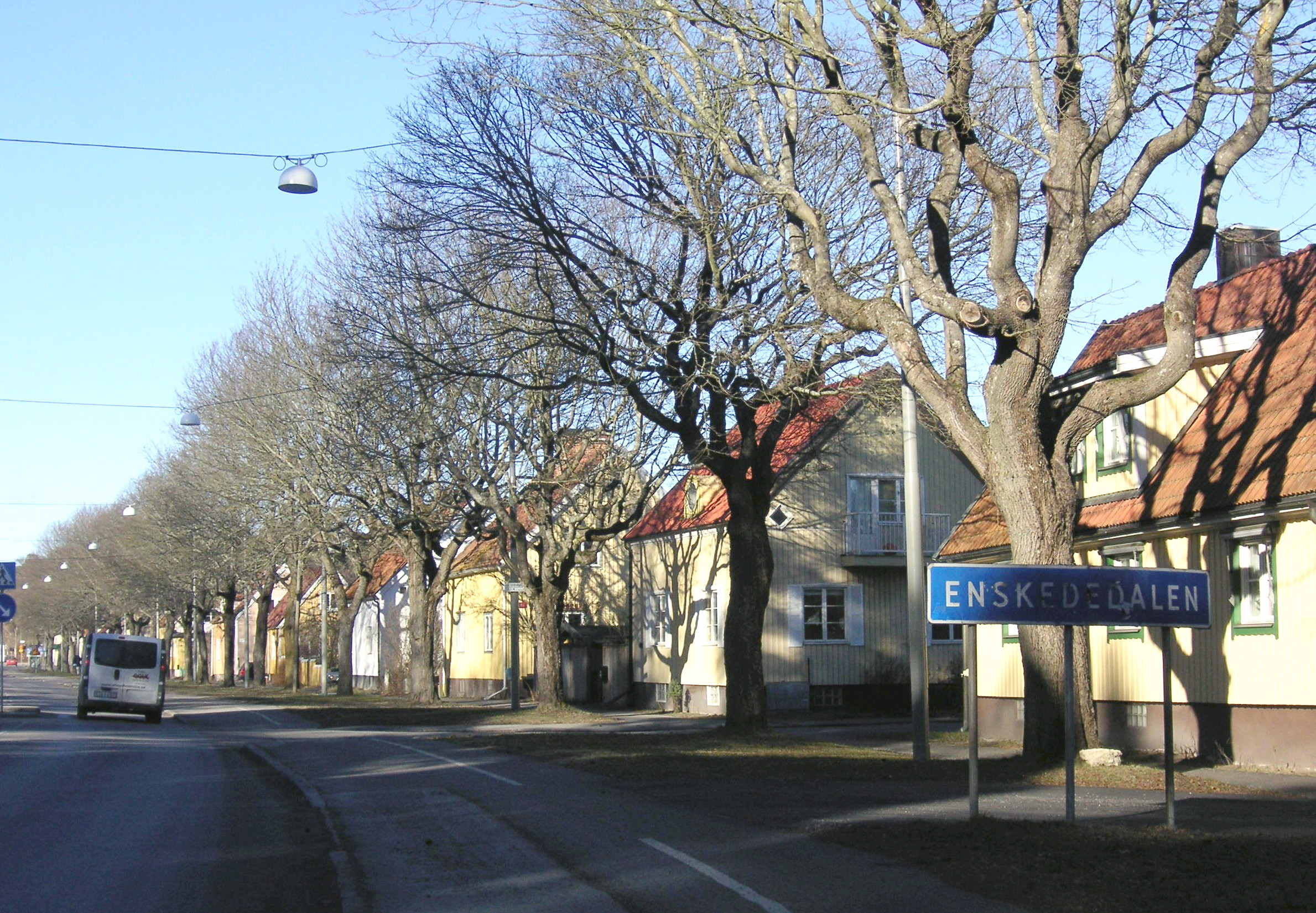
Enskededalen at the road Gamla Tyresövägen

Enskededalen is a district (Swedish: stadsdel) in Skarpnäck borough, Stockholm, Sweden. Enskededalen has 2,253 inhabitants as of December 31, 2007.

Enskededalen consists mostly of detached housing which were built as a garden city in the 1920s.
