= Skarpnäck (borough) =

- Borough of Stockholm
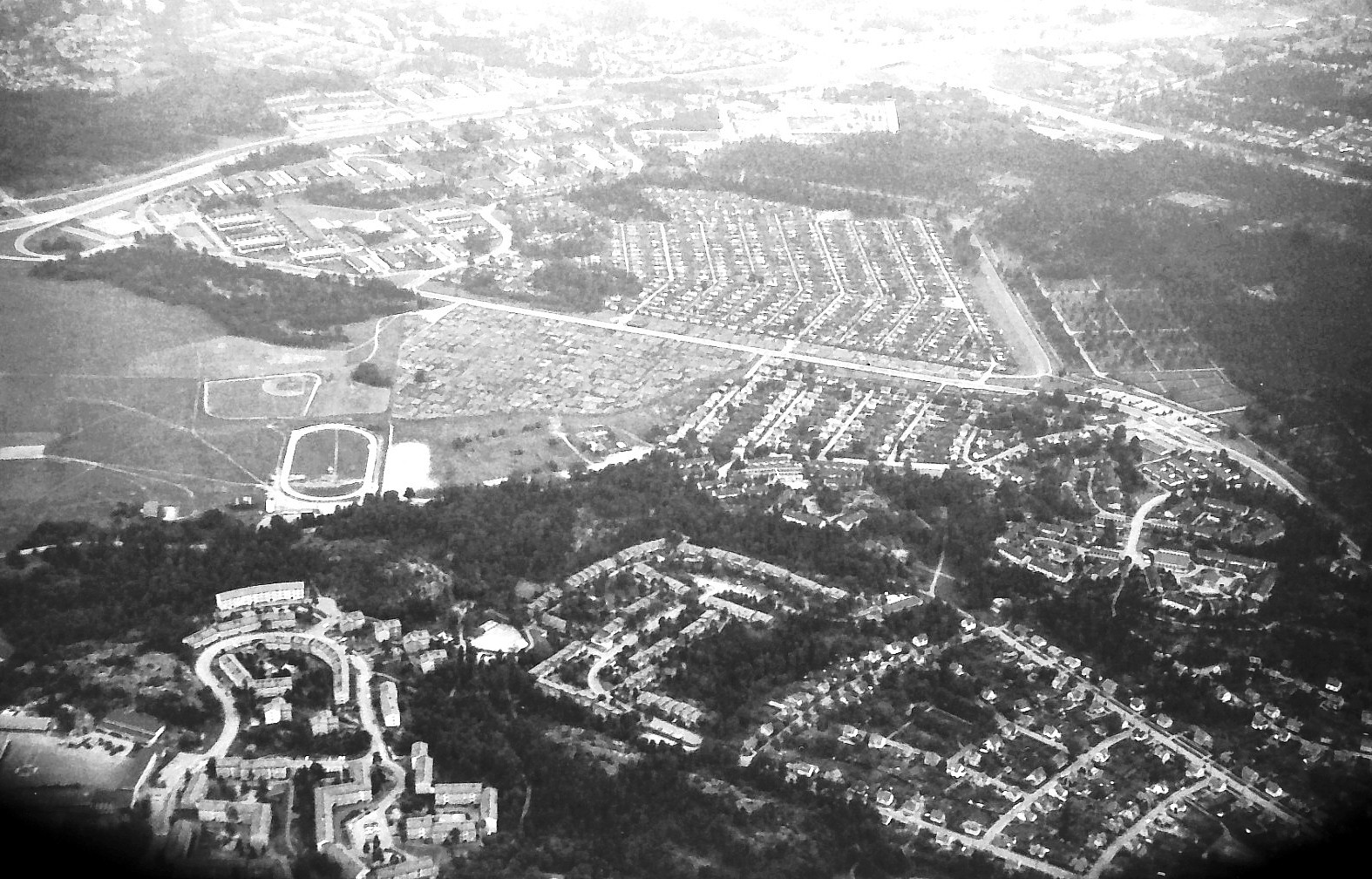
- Aerial view of Skarpnäck in 1980

- Location within Stockholm
- Coordinates: 59°21.45′N 17°52.20′E
- Country: Sweden
- Municipality: Stockholm
- Municipal part: Söderort
- Established: 1997

Area
  - Total: 15.66 km^{2} (6.05 sq mi)

Population (2014)
  - Total: 45,340
  - Density: 2,895/km^{2} (7,499/sq mi)
- Website: Skarpnäck on stockholm.se

Skarpnäck is a borough (stadsdelsområde) in the southern part of Stockholm, Sweden.

== Overview ==
This area corresponds mostly with the Skarpnäck parish. The districts that make up the borough are Bagarmossen, Björkhagen, Enskededalen, Flaten, Hammarbyhöjden (except the Blåsut subdistrict), Kärrtorp, Orhem, Skarpnäcks Gård, and Skrubba.

The population of Skarpnäck borough is 40,707 as of December 31, 2007 on an area of 15.66 square kilometres (6.05 sq mi), which gives a density of 2,599 inhabitants per square kilometer (6,730 inhabitants/mi^{2}).

== Sports ==
The following sports clubs are located in Skarpnäck:

- Bagarmossen Kärrtorp BK
- Spårvägens GoIF
- Spårvägens FF
