= Hammarbyhöjden =

City district in Stockholm, Sweden

Coordinates: 59°17′48.49″N 18°5′43.92″E

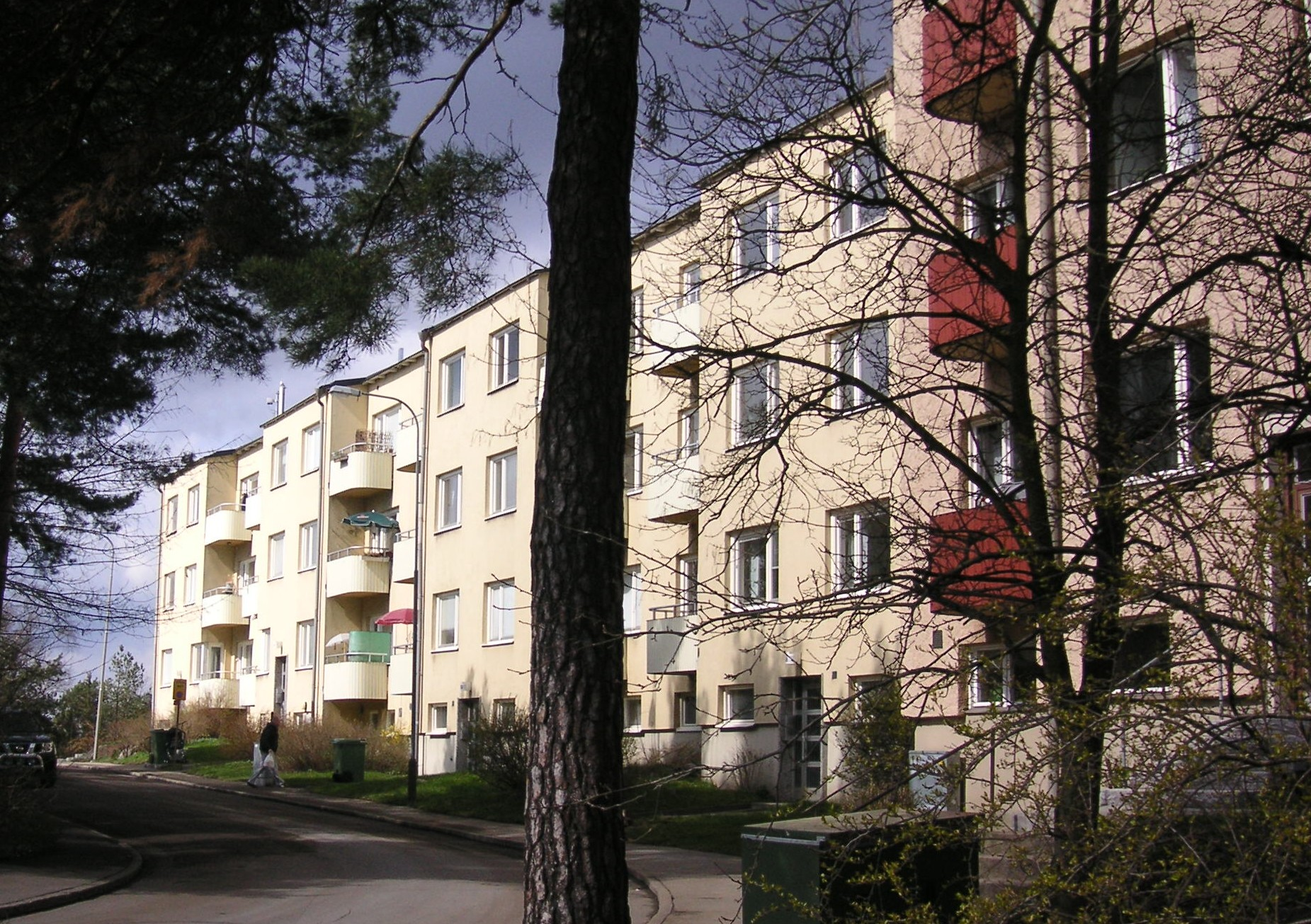
Hammarbyhöjden in 2008.

Hammarbyhöjden is a city district in Stockholm, Sweden. The district is split across two boroughs: Most of it is located in Skarpnäck borough, the sub-district Blåsut is located in the Enskede-Årsta-Vantör borough. As of December 31, 2007, Hammarbyhöjden had 8,143 inhabitants.

The Stockholm Metro station Hammarbyhöjden is an elevated station opened in 1958. The station is served by the green line 17.

== History ==
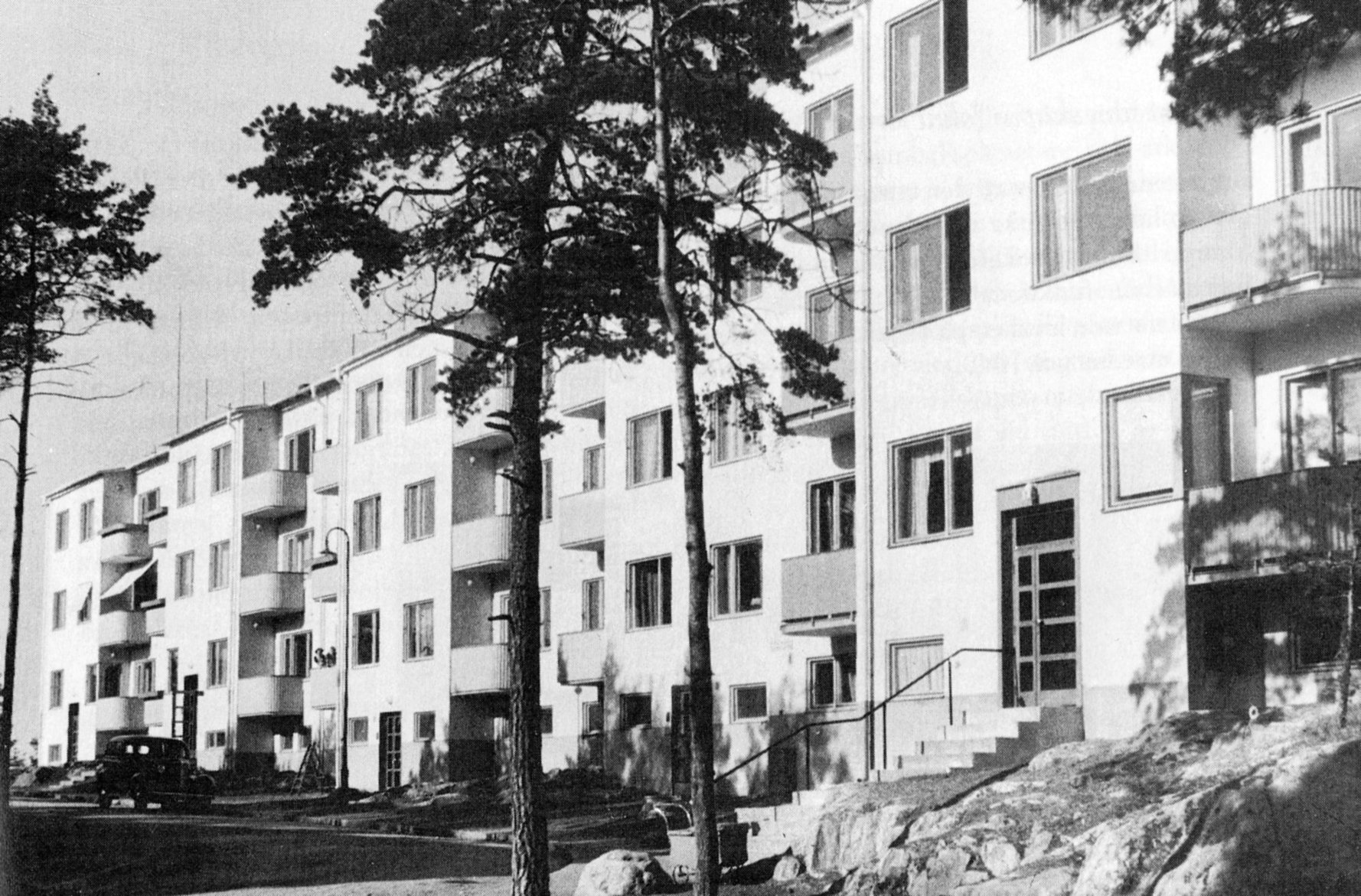
Hammarbyhöjden in 1940.

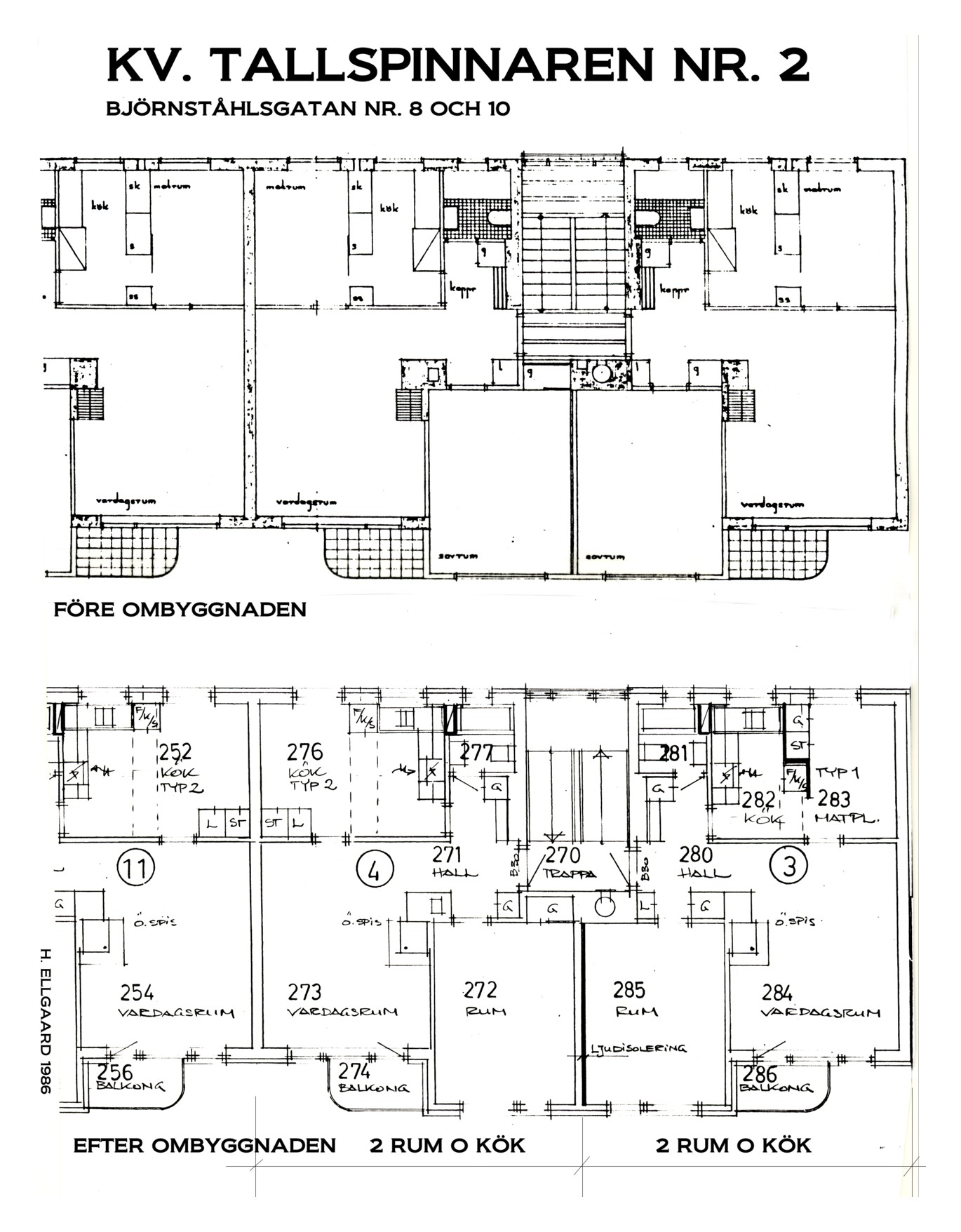
A typical plan.

Together with Traneberg, a district west of the historical city centre, Hammarbyhöjden was one of the centrally located, hilly terrains bought by the city of Stockholm in 1917. The terrain made it unsuitable for the kind of garden cities built during the 1910s and 1920s. Furthermore, by the early 1930s the city authorities had realised the successful small-scale projects of the past could not solve the ramping shortage of dwellings the city was experiencing. In both these districts the ideals of Functionalist architecture — multi-family buildings in a natural scenery — were therefore implemented. A plan for the area was adopted in 1930, featuring 15 metres thick buildings 3–4 stories tall. The early 1930s saw few construction projects realized, and when a builder willing to carry the project out finally appeared, he demanded that the plan should be redrawn in accordance to a proposal by Ragnar Östberg — a plan featuring buildings 10 m wide arranged in an unmistakably classicist manner. These negotiations foundered, however, and the city redrew the plans again — now with a programmatically functionalist plan. Construction finally started in 1935, but, due to the stalled negotiations, Hammarbyhöjden lost its pioneering role to Traneberg which had its 1932 city plan quickly realised. Nevertheless, more than 4.000 flats had been built in Hammarbyhöjden by the 1950s, 92 per cent of which were two room-flats with a kitchen or smaller.

Construction was small-scale and artisanal. The three-story buildings had only two stairwells, which made them easy to deploy in the uneven terrain, while the flats reaching through the buildings made it easy to orient the buildings in different directions. The heights were used for panoramic views, and the roads were made to follow the terrain. On its completion, the district was described as an "ideal society" and named "The White city" (Den vita staden), but its first inhabitants were more sceptical, complaining on inadequate services, high rents, and the long distance to the city centre. Many of those who did move in did, however, end up living their entire lives in Hammarbyhöjden.

== See also ==
- Hammarby
