= Björkhagen =

Urban district in Stockholm, Sweden

Coordinates: 59°17′24.78″N 18°7′1.25″E

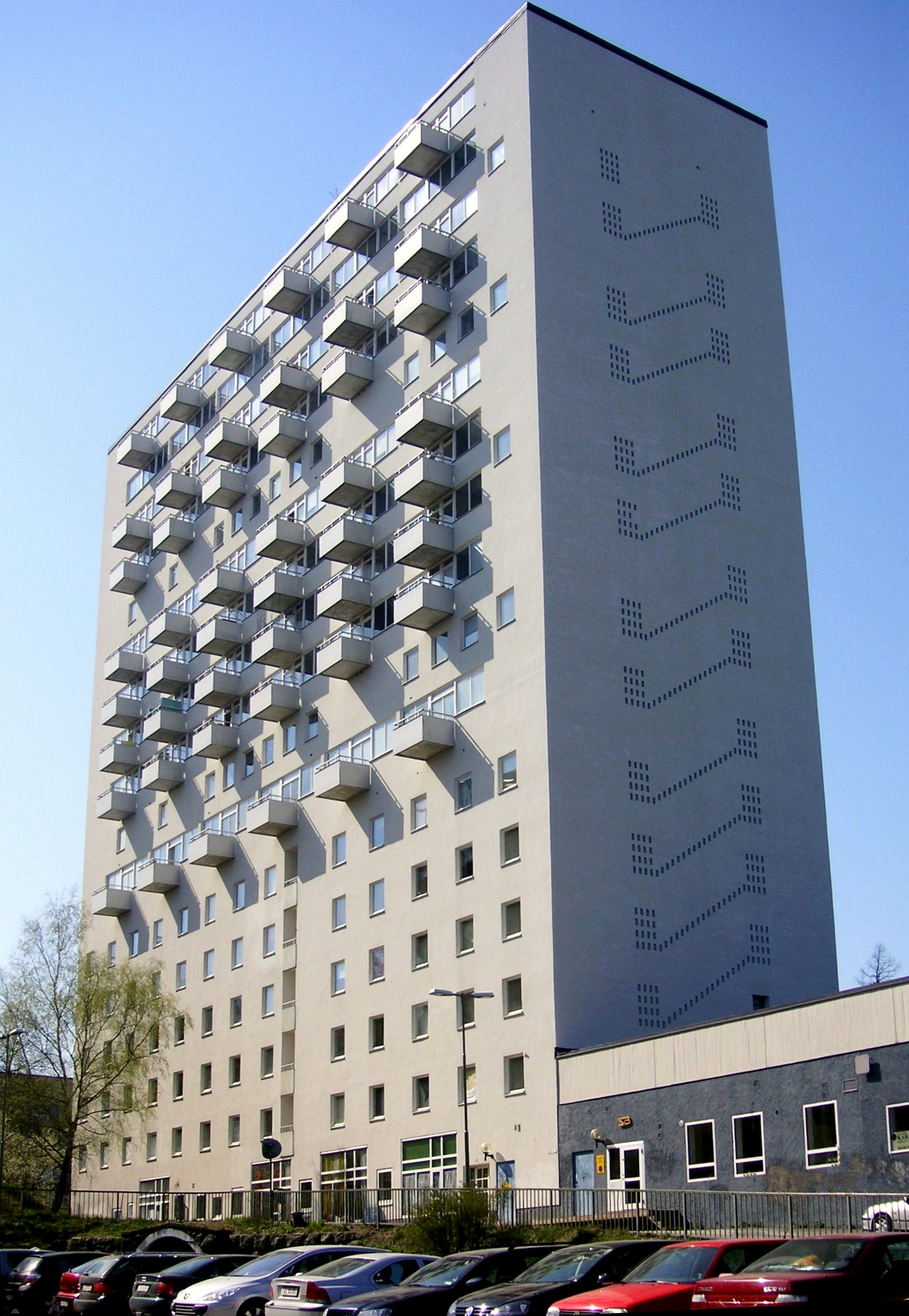
Duggregnet 5 apartment block

Björkhagen (The Birch Pasture) is a district (Swedish: stadsdel) in Skarpnäck borough, Stockholm, Sweden. Björkhagen has 5,695 inhabitants as of December 31, 2007.

The Stockholm Metro station Björkhagen is an elevated station which is served by the Green Line 17.
