= Vårberg =

Suburb of Stockholm, Sweden

Coordinates: 59°16′33.25″N 17°53′23.81″E

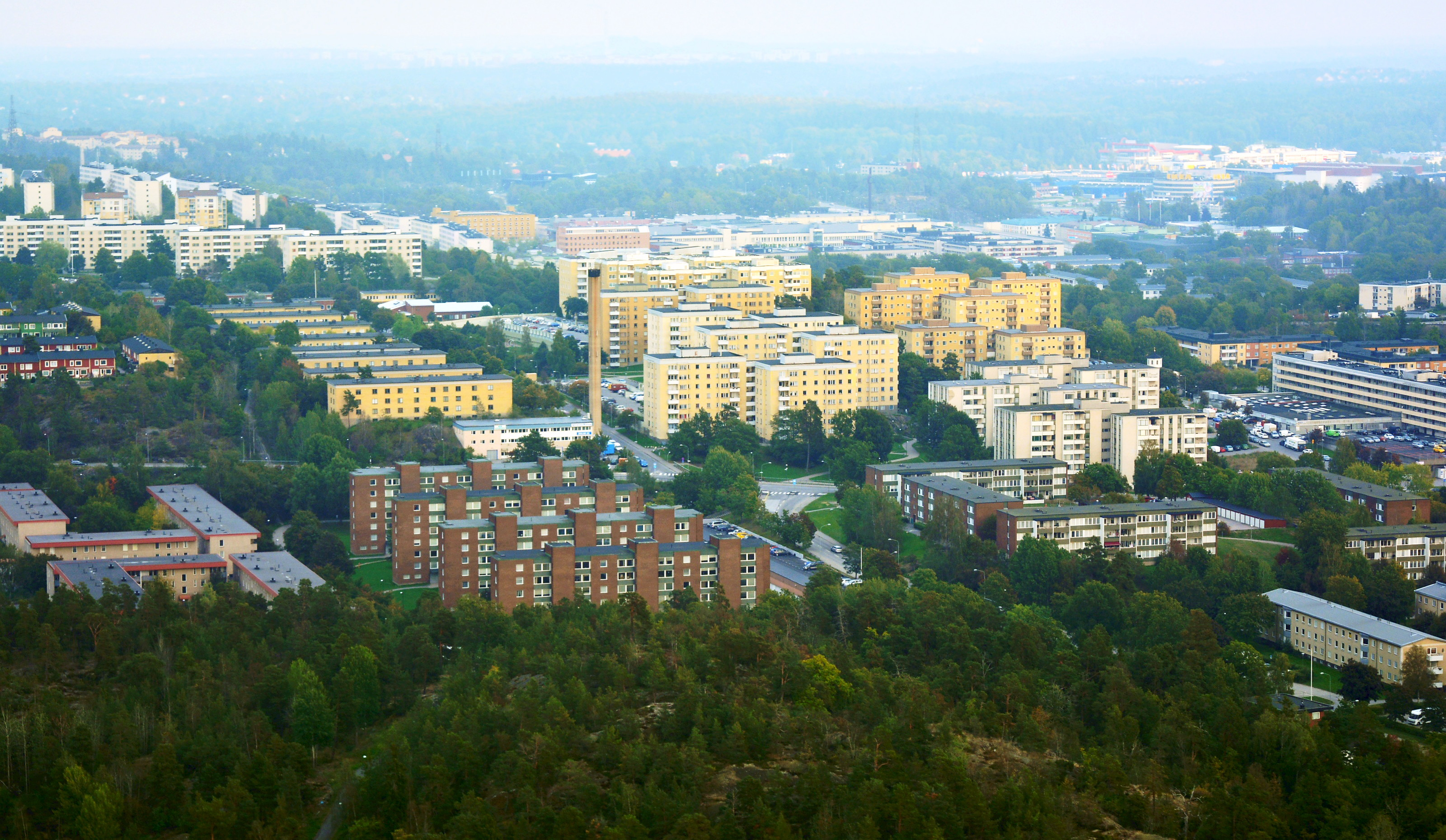
Aerial view of Vårberg

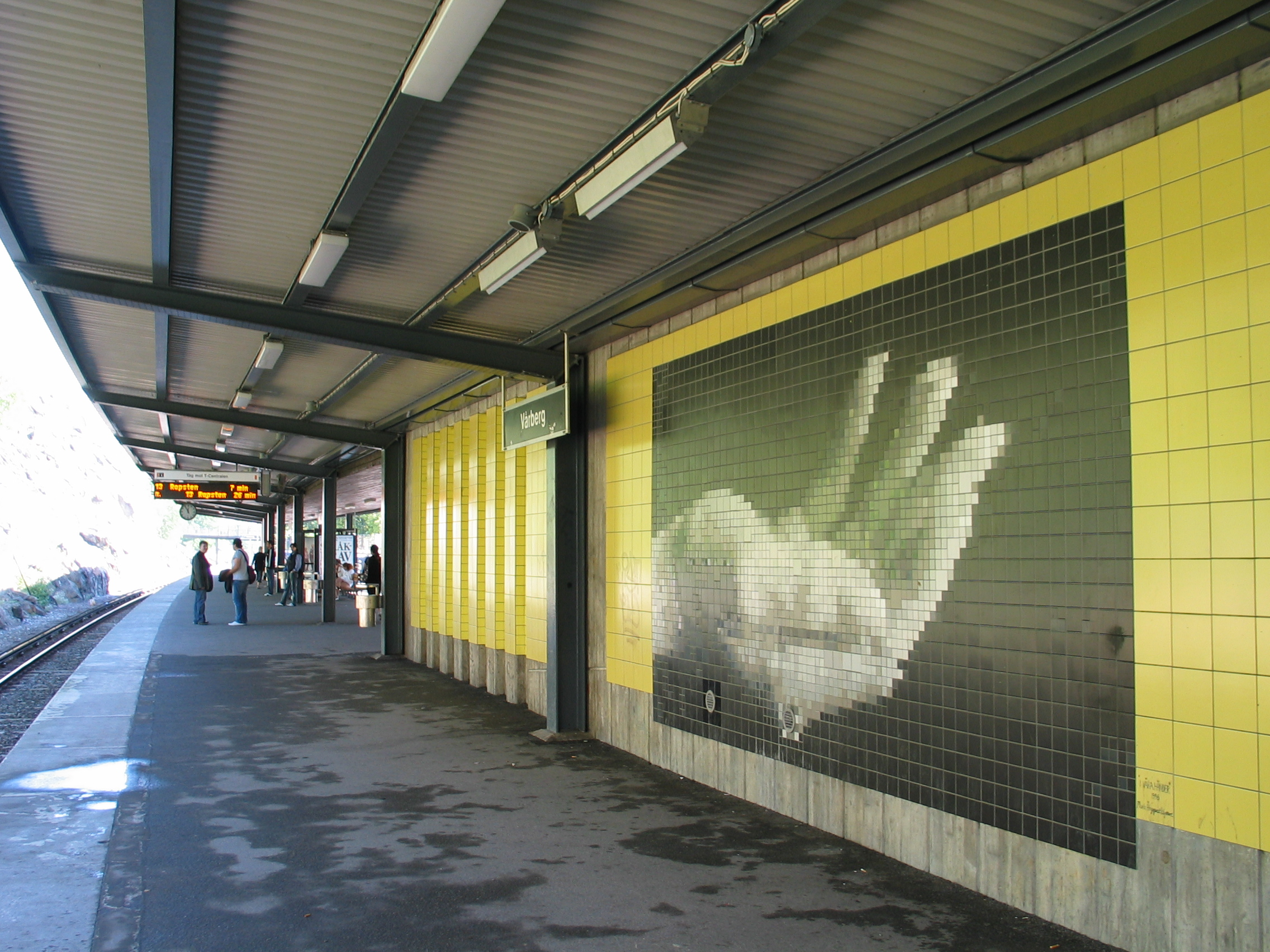
Mosaic in Vårberg subway station by artist Maria Ängquist Klyvare

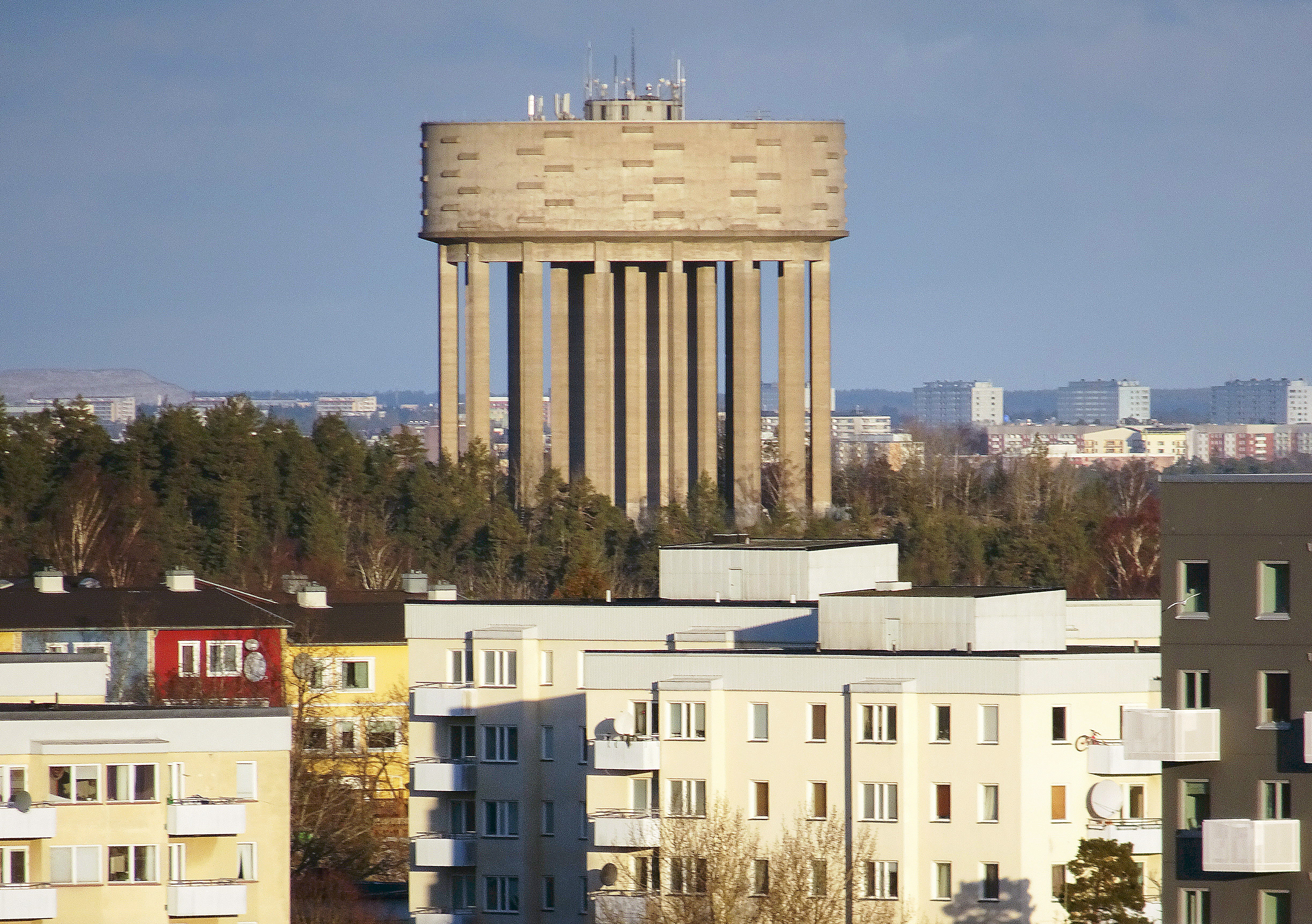
Sätra water tower seen from Vårbergstoppen

Vårberg (lit. 'Spring Hill') is a suburb in the Skärholmen borough of the Söderort region in Stockholm, Sweden.

== Location ==
Vårberg borders Skärholmen, Vårby gård, Huddinge, Estbröte, Kungshatt, and Ekerö. It has an area of 197 hectares of land and 65 hectares of water. As of 31 December 2007, its population was 8,454. The suburb contains the highest natural point in Stockholm, Vikingaberget, which is 77.24 m above sea level. It also includes Vårbergstoppen, an artificial hill which was built from spoil from the excavation the Stockholm Metro, which at 90 m above sea level is the highest point of land in the city.

== History ==
The original city plan for Vårberg was formulated in the regional plan of 1958. The area was incorporated into Stockholm on 1 January 1963. Between 1965 and 1968, 14 city plans were prepared by the Stockholm City Building Office. The centre of Vårberg was inaugurated in September 1968, featuring apartment buildings and townhouses. The centre was designed by architect Hack Kampmann.

== Transport ==
Vårberg is served by Vårberg metro station on Line 13 of the Stockholm Metro, located between Vårby Gård and Skärholmen stations. As part of the Art in the Stockholm Metro project, the station features mosaic artwork depicting hands, created by Maria Ängquist Klyvare in 1996

== See also ==
- Vårberg metro station
