= Masmo metro station =

Stockholm Metro station

Masmo
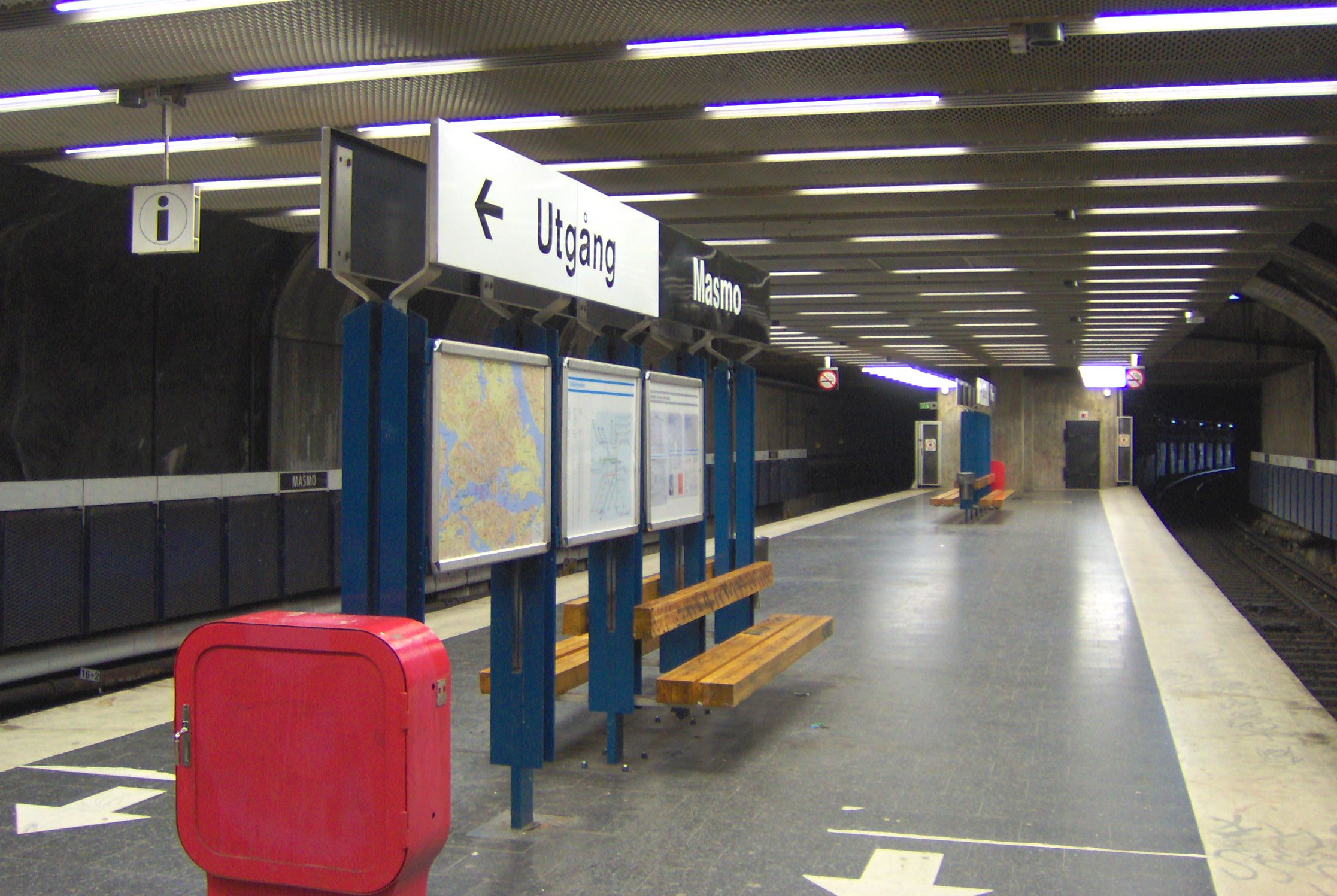

General information
- Coordinates: 59°14′59″N 17°52′49″E
- Elevation: 11.1 m (36 ft) above sea level
- System: Stockholm Metro station
- Owner: Storstockholms Lokaltrafik
- Platforms: 1 island platform
- Tracks: 2

Construction
- Structure type: Underground
- Depth: 20–45 m (66–148 ft)
- Accessible: Yes

Other information
- Station code: MAS

History
- Opened: 1 October 1972; 54 years ago

Passengers
- 2019: 2,400 boarding per weekday

Services
Preceding station	Stockholm Metro	Following station
Fittja towards Norsborg	Line 13	Vårby gård towards Ropsten
Location
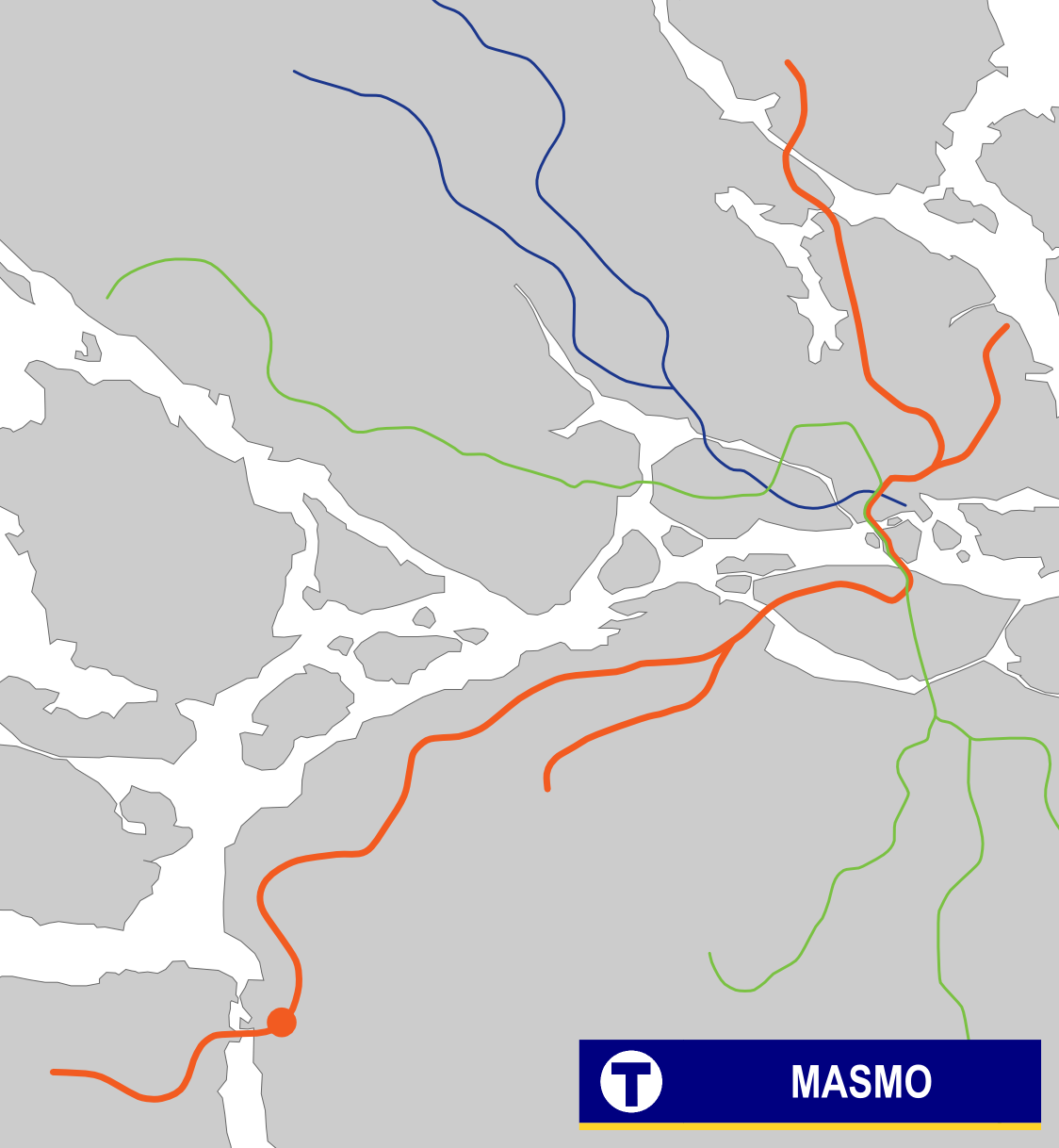

Masmo is a station on Line 13 of the Red Line of the Stockholm Metro, located in Masmo, Vårby, Huddinge Municipality, Sweden. The station opened on 1 October 1972 as part of the extension from Vårberg to Fittja. The station is 16.1 km (10.0 mi) from Slussen.

The station is situated below ground, with its island platform between 20 metres (66 ft) to 40 metres (130 ft) below ground. It has a single entrance, from Varvsvägen. This gives access, via a horizontal tunnel, to the ticket office and barriers, which are situated one level above the platform.

Masmo was the first of the so-called cave-stations (grottstations) where, rather than building an underground concrete box or vault, the stations are blasted out of rock and the shape of the remaining rock determines the contours of the underground space. This method would be used in many later underground stations, including all of those on the Blue line.

The station is decorated with the work Take the sun in the subway, created in 1971 by Staffan Hallström and Lasse Andréasson and executed as painted plates on the rock wall. In 2015, Land arkitektur added some 40 orange-red poles that stand near the station entrance.

== Gallery ==
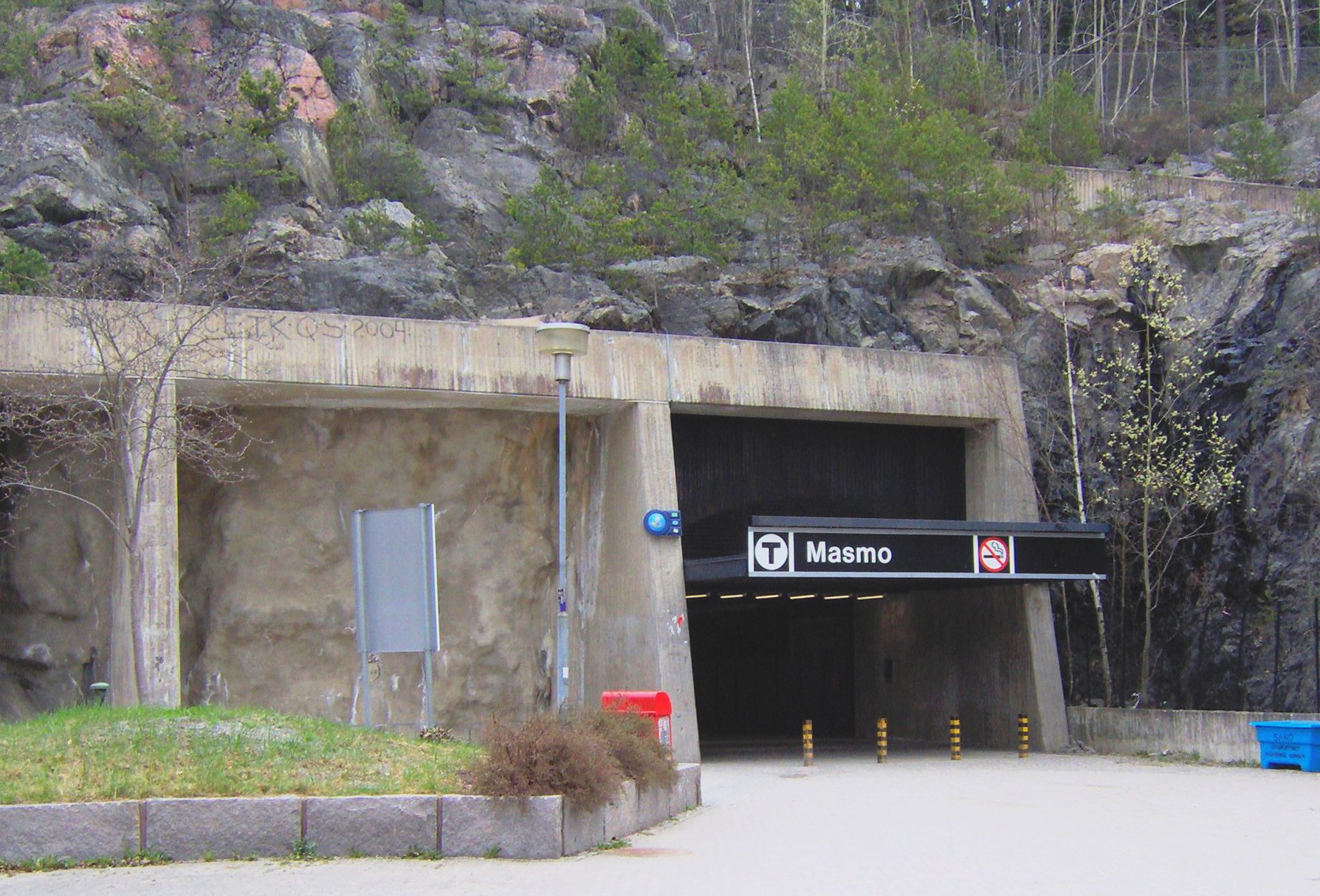
Station entrance

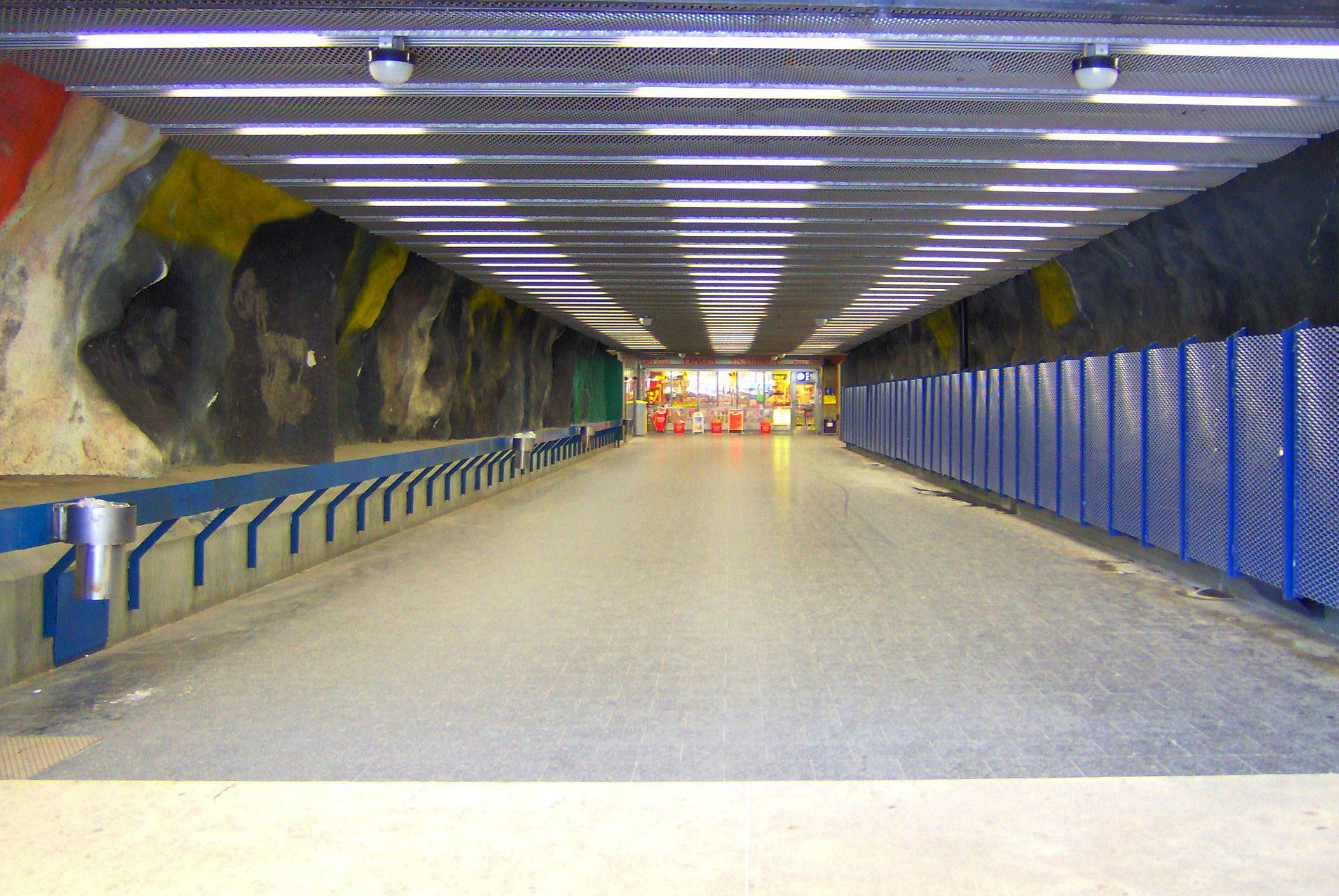
The entrance tunnel

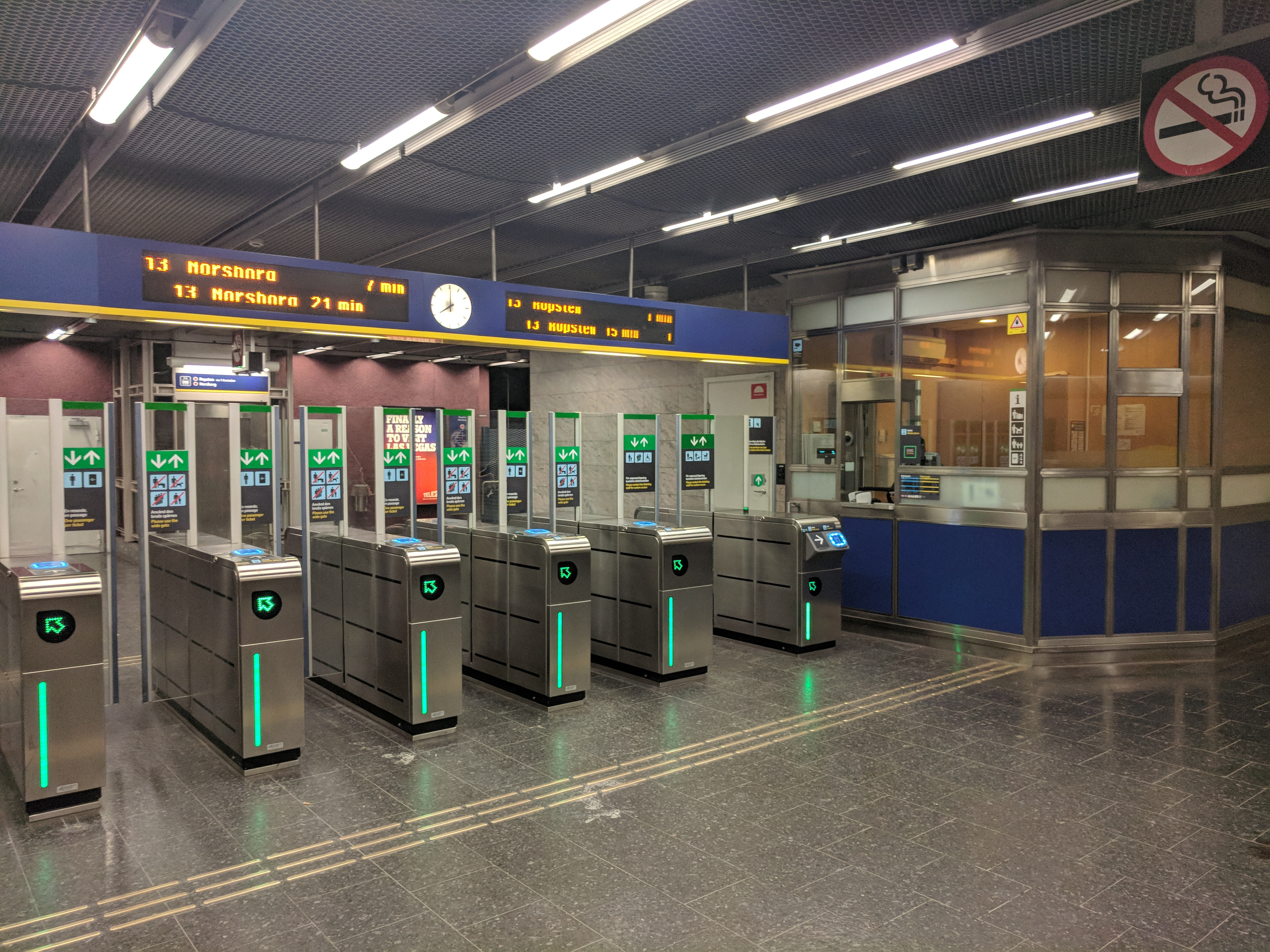
Ticket barriers and access to platform

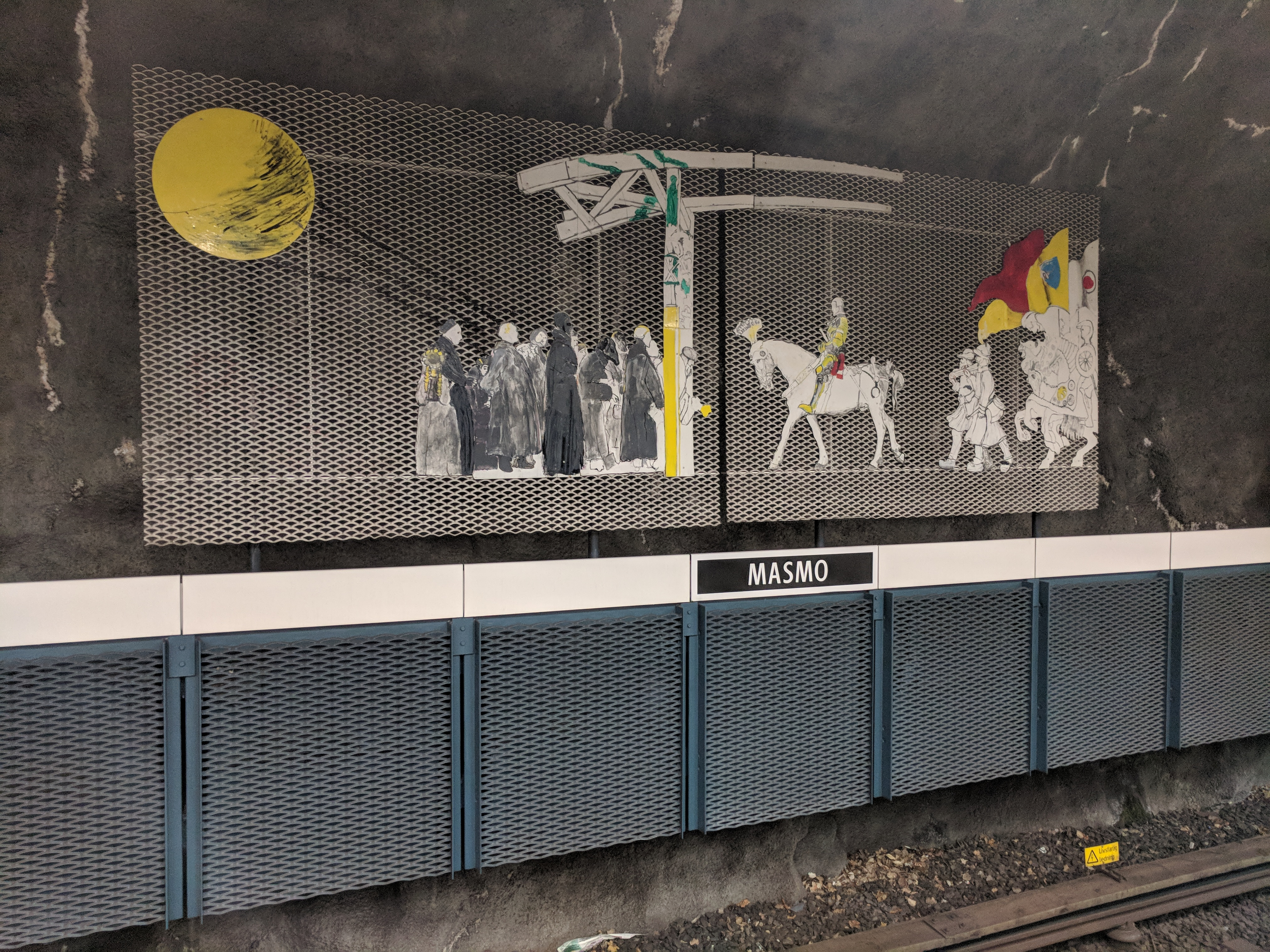
Art work Take the sun in the subway
