= Skärholmen =

Urban district in Stockholm, Sweden

Coordinates: 59°16′37.59″N 17°54′25.15″E

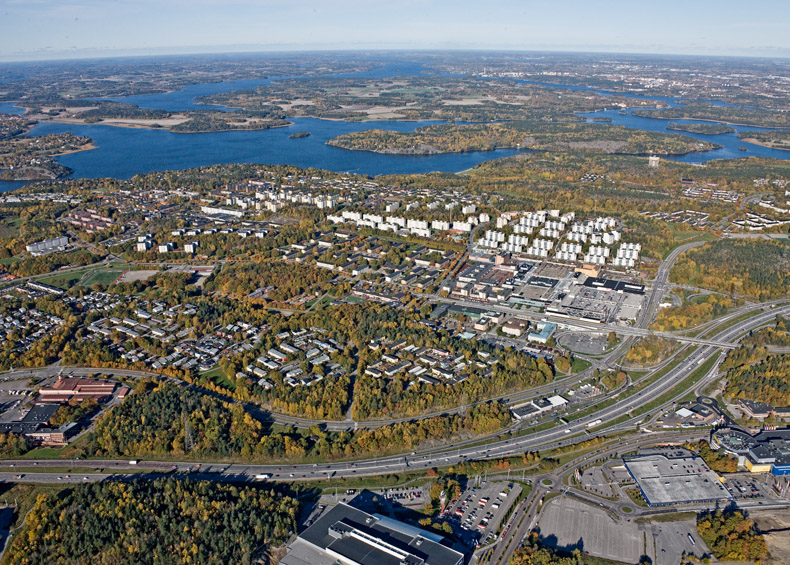
Aerial view of Skärholmen

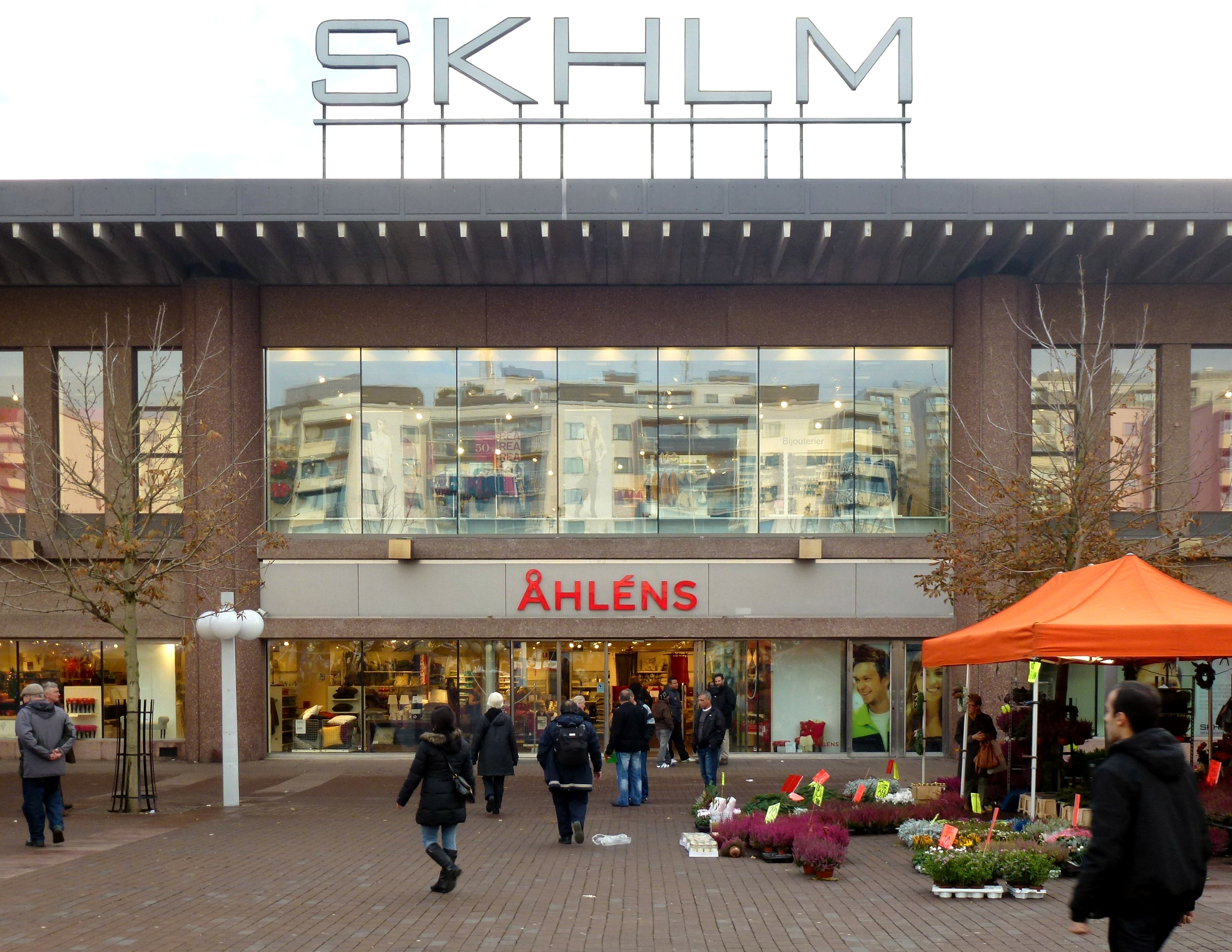
Skärholmen Centrum

Skärholmen (lit. 'Rocky Islet') is a suburban area in the district of Söderort in south-western Stockholm, Sweden. Together with Bredäng, Sätra and Vårberg, it forms the borough of Skärholmen. The community primarily consisting of Million Programme style apartment buildings from the 1960s and early 1970s. It is one of the larger and more well known suburbs of Stockholm. Skärholmen Centrum (also known as SKHLM), one of the biggest shopping centres in Sweden is situated in Skärholmen.

== Metro station ==
The Skärholmen metro station serving the community was opened in 1967. It is on the Red Line of the Stockholm Metro.

23% were foreign born in 1983. 55.6% in 1997 had a foreign background, up to 72.3% in 2008.

== Sports ==
The following sports clubs are located in Skärholmen:

- IFK Stockholm

== See also ==
- Murder of Mikael Janicki
