= Vårby gård metro station =

Stockholm Metro station

Vårby gård
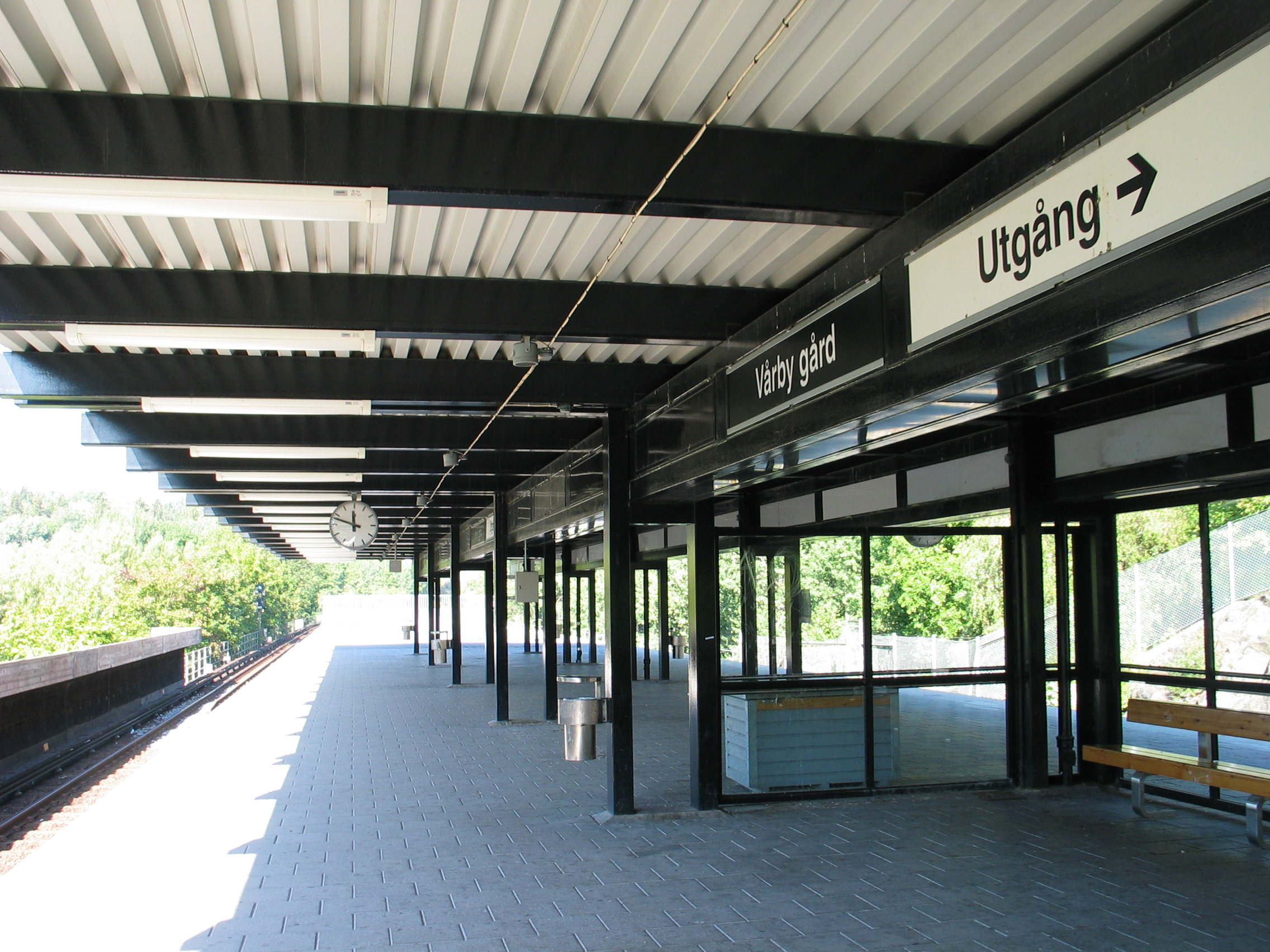

General information
- Coordinates: 59°15′53″N 17°53′02″E
- Elevation: 27.3 m (90 ft) above sea level
- System: Stockholm Metro station
- Owner: Storstockholms Lokaltrafik
- Platforms: 1 island platform
- Tracks: 2

Construction
- Structure type: Elevated
- Accessible: Yes

Other information
- Station code: VÅG

History
- Opened: 1 October 1972; 54 years ago

Passengers
- 2019: 3,850 boarding per weekday

Services
Preceding station	Stockholm Metro	Following station
Masmo towards Norsborg	Line 13	Vårberg towards Ropsten
Location
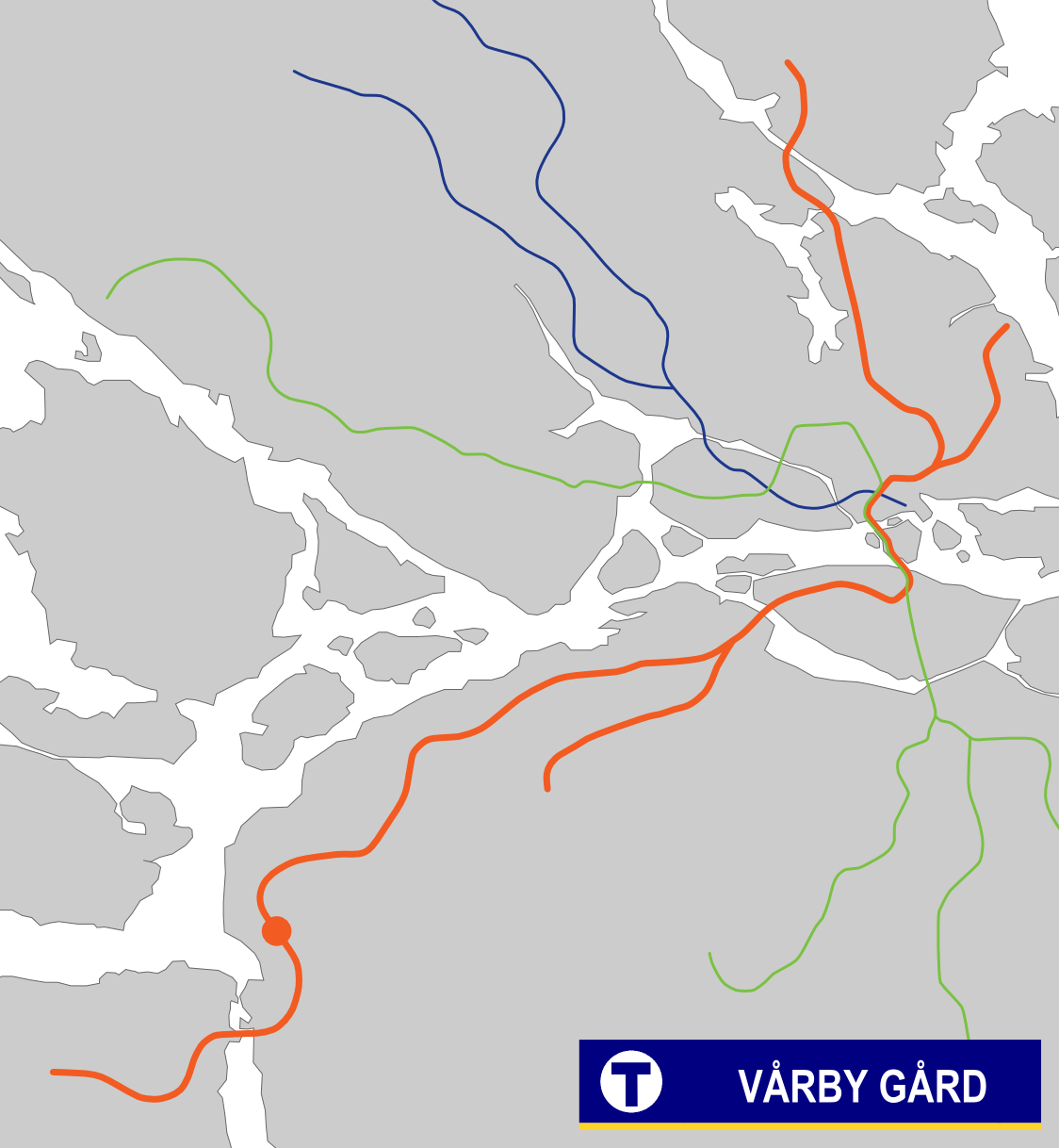

Vårby gård is a station on Line 13 of the Red Line of the Stockholm Metro, located in Vårby, Huddinge Municipality, Sweden. The station opened on 1 October 1972 as part of the extension from Vårberg to Fittja.

The station has an elevated island platform just north of the point where trains from Masmo station to the south emerge from tunnel. There is access to the platform from both above the tunnel exit and from below the platform. Both entrances lead, via strairs, ramps and a lift, to a single ticket office and barrier line at platform level, which gives direct access to the southern end of the platform.

As part of Art in the Stockholm metro project, the station features a flora-themed mural, created by Rolf Bergström in 1999.

On 7 January 2018, an explosion occurred just outside the station, killing a man in his 60s and injuring his wife. The man is believed to have picked up a suspected hand grenade from the ground. There was no evidence that the incident was related to terrorism or that the couple were specifically targeted.

== Gallery ==
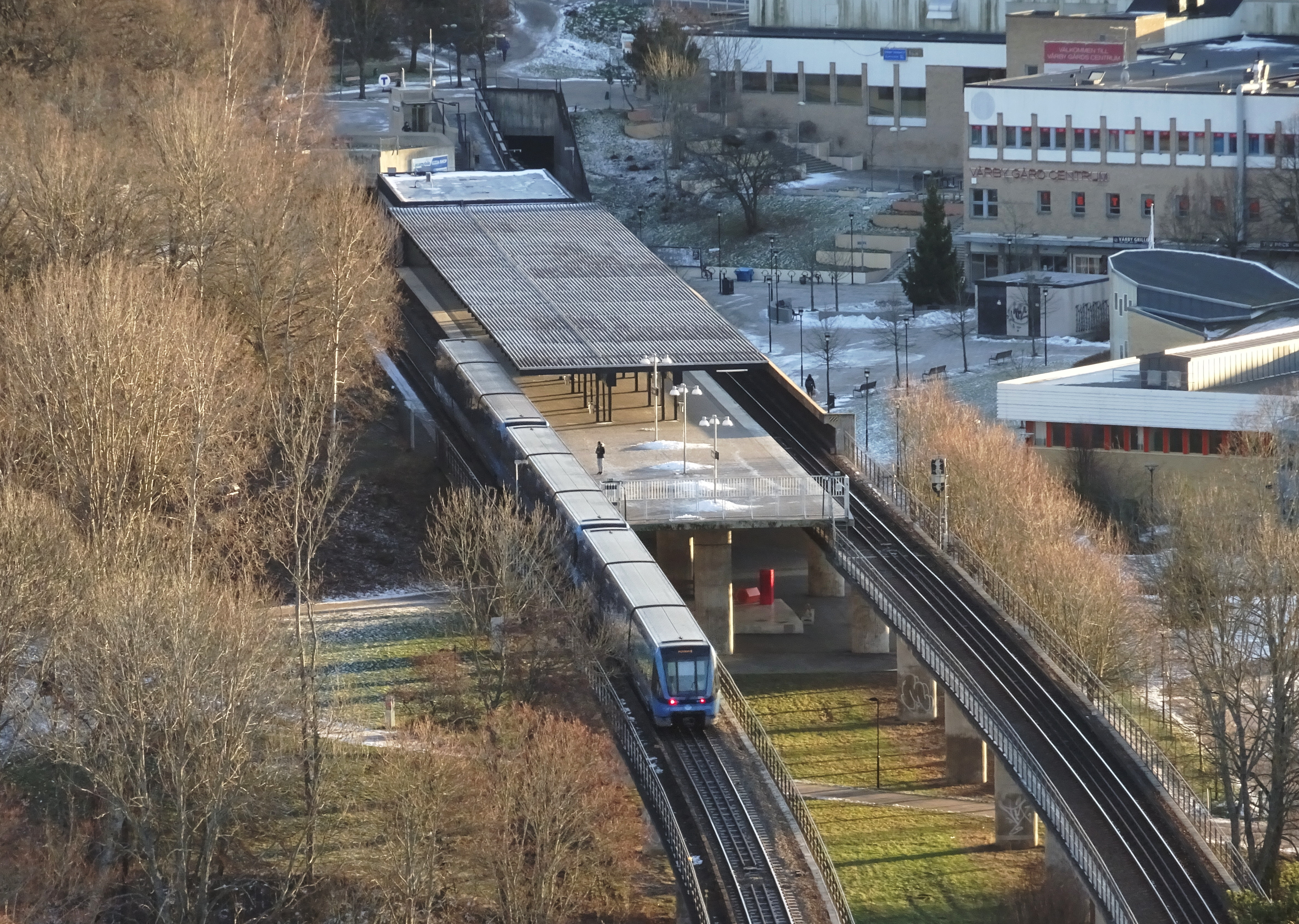
Aerial view of the station from the north

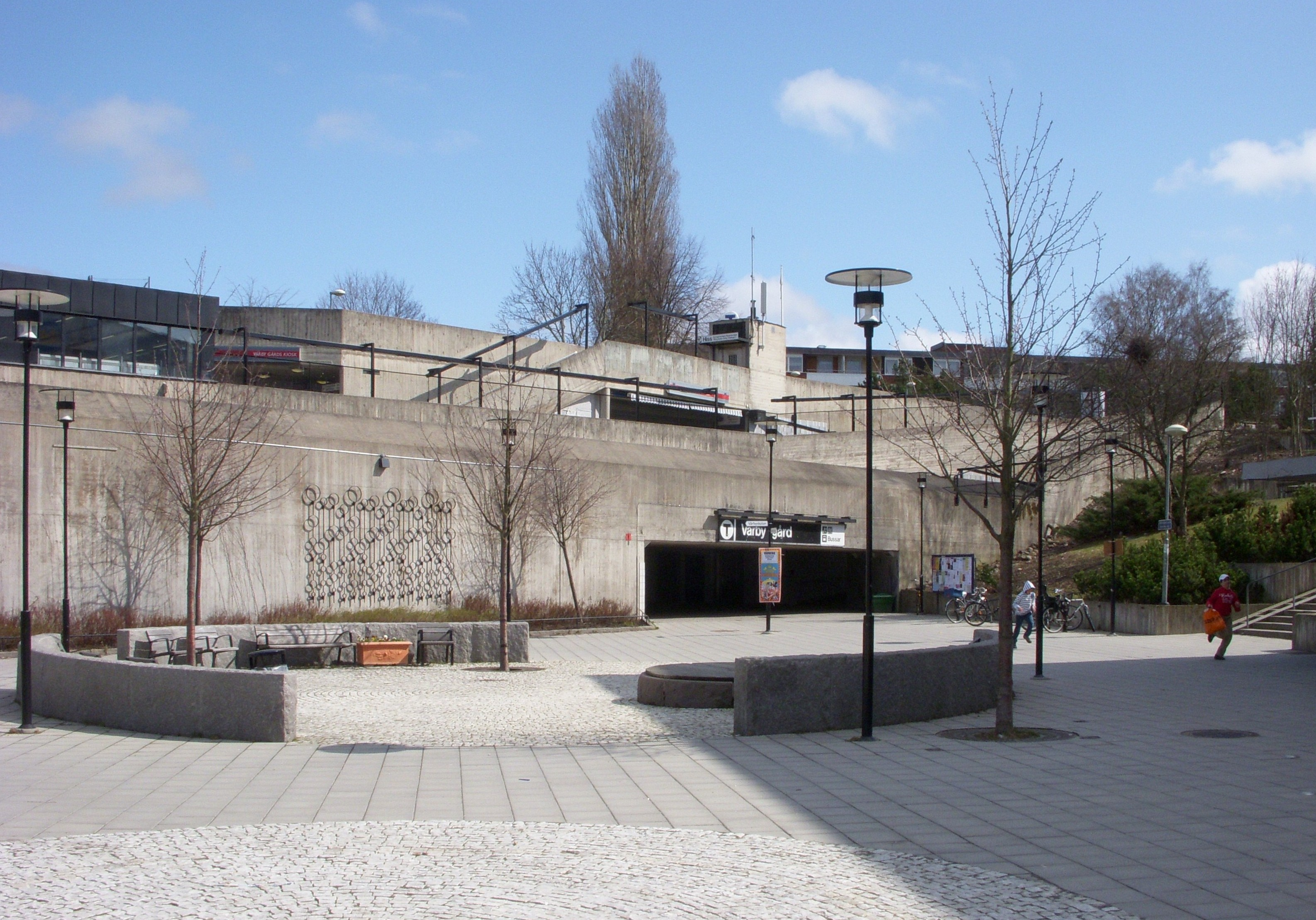
Upper and lower accesses to the station

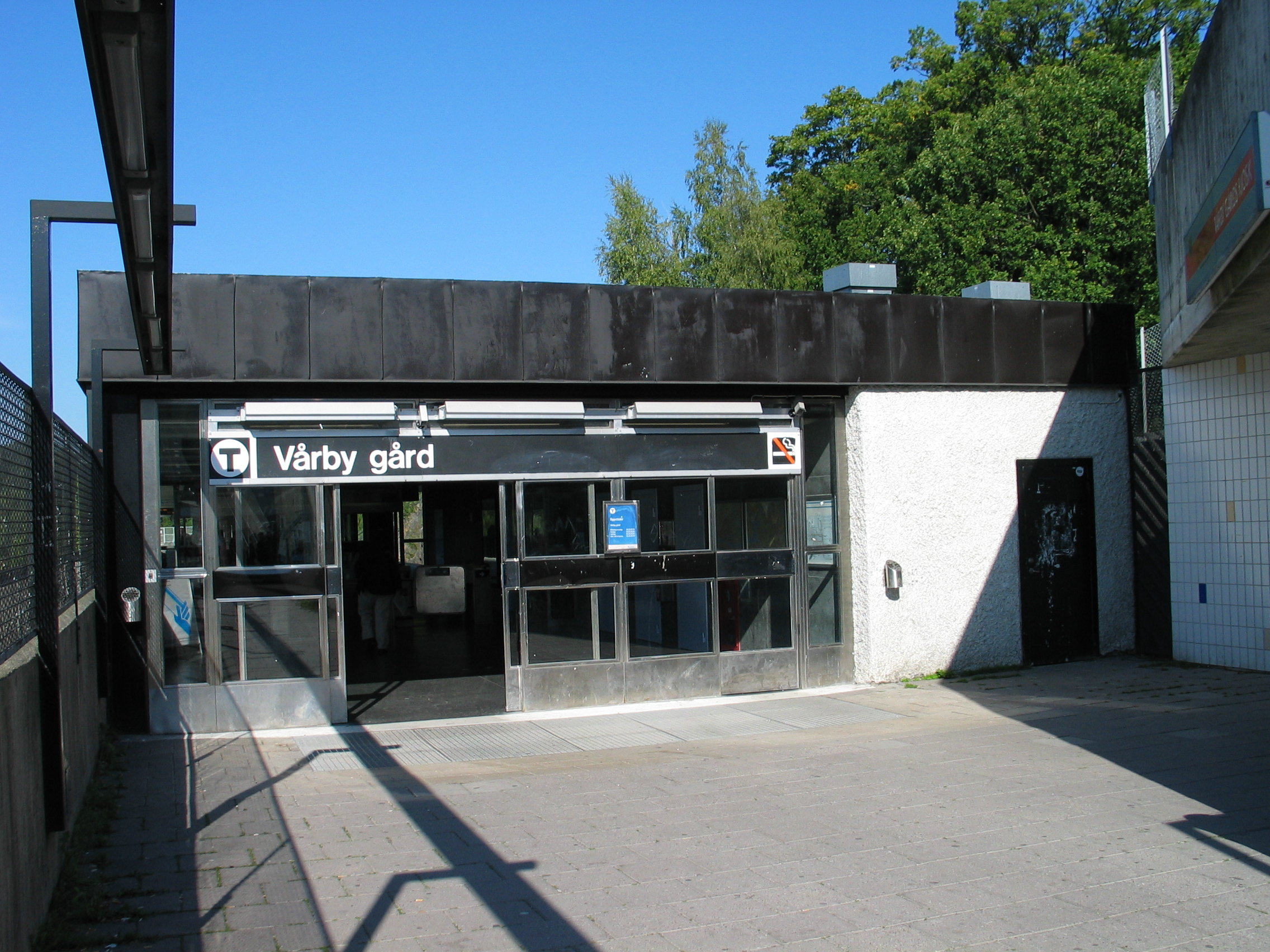
Platform level ticket hall

Approach viaduct from north
