= Skärholmen Centrum =

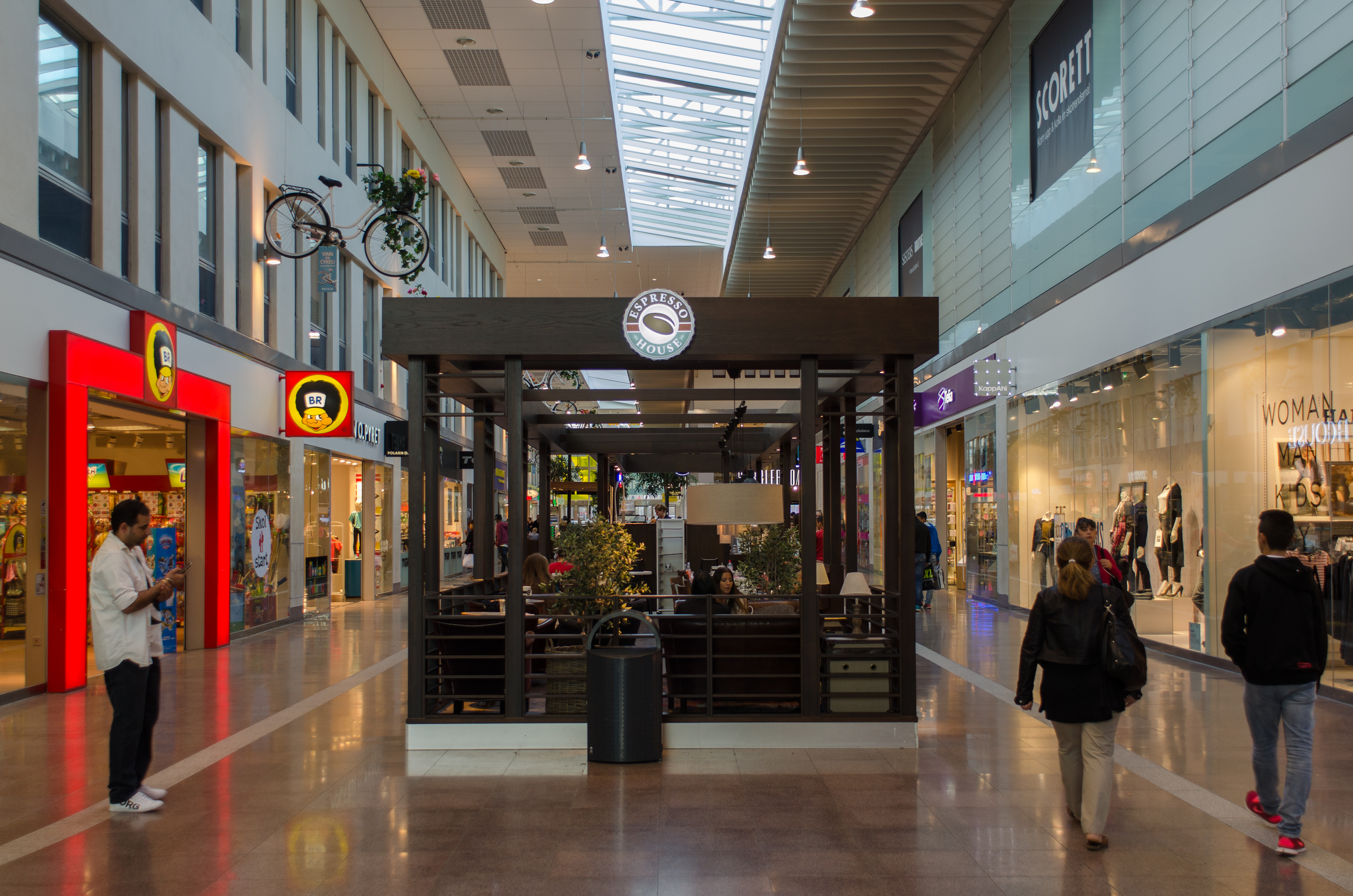
- Location: Stockholm, Sweden
- Coordinates: 59°16′33.48″N 17°54′22.31″E
- Opened: 1968
- Owner: Grosvenor Group
- Num. of stores: 102
- Num. of anchor tenants: 4
- Floor area: 98,000 m^{2} (1,050,000 sq ft)
- Parking: 3,000
- Public transit: Skärholmen metro station
- Website: skhlm.se

Skärholmen Centrum, also known and contracted as SKHLM, is a shopping center located in the Skärholmen borough of Stockholm in Sweden. The mall has a total gross leasable area of 98,000 m^{2} (1,050,000 sq ft), including of public services, and is anchored by ICA, Systembolaget, H&M and Åhléns. It is one of five malls owned by the Grosvenor Group in Sweden, and attracts approximately 14 million visitors annually, with an annual turnover of SEK 2 billion.

The shopping centre was inaugurated in 1968 by Prince Bertil, Duke of Halland and has been refurbished a number of times, most notably in 2008, when it was reopened by King Carl XVI Gustav.

The shopping centre is adjacent to the Skärholmen metro station, on the Red Line of the Stockholm Metro.

== See also ==
- List of shopping centres in Sweden
