= Kungshatt =

Island in Lake Mälaren, Stockholm, Sweden

Coordinates: 59°18′N 17°53′E

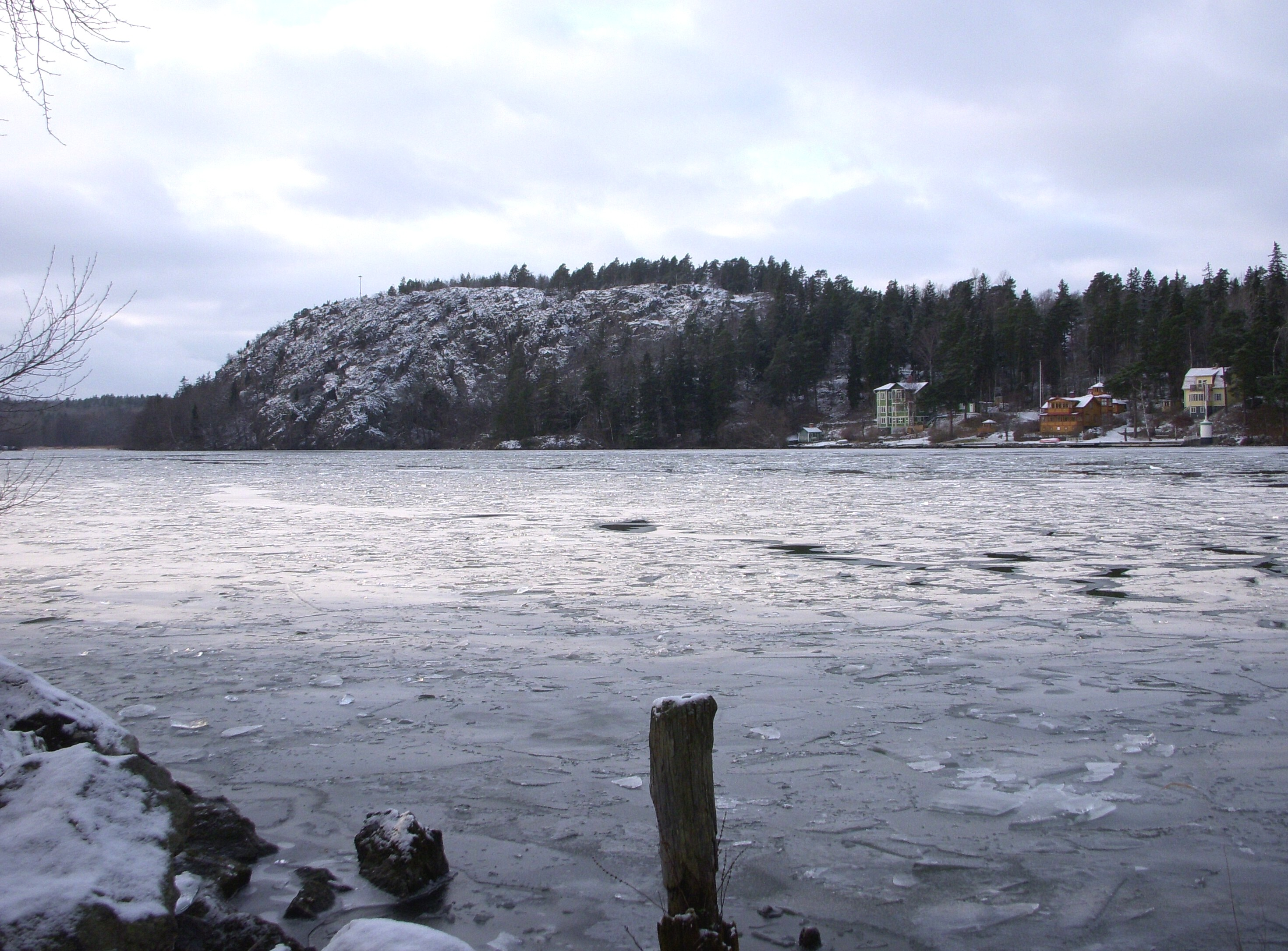
Kungshatt in wintertime. The eponymical "hat" is visible on top of its pole in the centre of the picture.

Kungshatt (Swedish pronunciation: [kɵŋsˈhatː]) is a small island in Lake Mälaren, Stockholm, Sweden. Roughly 1.9 square kilometers in area, it has a very small year-round population, and a number of summer houses. The island has an independent water supply, but receives its electricity from the mainland. The island is named after the copper hat put in place on top of a cliff facing towards Vårberg. According to legend, a Swedish king jumped off the cliff while fleeing from his enemies, dropping his hat in the process.
