= Hack Kampmann (1913–2005) =

Danish-Swedish architect (1913–2005)

Hack Kampmann (1913–2005) was a Danish-Swedish architect.

== Early life ==
Kampmann was born on 18 July 1913 in Nyborg, Denmark. He was the son of the lawyer Erik Pontoppidan Kampmann and Ellen Saxild, and was related to the earlier Danish architect Hack Kampmann, who lived between 1856 and 1920. He studied at the Royal Academy of Fine Arts School of Architecture in Copenhagen in 1941, and then at the Royal Academy of Fine Arts in Stockholm.

Kampmann began working as an architect at Wejke & Ödéen after the end of World War II. As a modernist architect, he designed a number of housing projects in the inner city of Stockholm, as well as some suburban centers.

== Notable works ==
Amongst Kampmann's notable works are:

- The Swedish consulate in Hamburg, Germany, 1954
- Hotell Foresta, a hotel and conference facility in Lidingö, Stockholm, 1957
- Hagsätra centrum, a suburban centre in Hagsätra, Stockholm, 1957–1959
- Schönborg 6, a residential and office building building in Södermalm, Stockholm, 1962
- Vårberg metro station and Vårberg centrum, a suburban complex in Vårberg, Stockholm, 1968
- Nya Strindbergshuset in Östermalm, Stockholm, 1969–1970

== Later life ==
Kampmann ran his own architectural office until 1976. He died on 17 July 2005 in Skanör, Sweden.
