= Fittja metro station =

Stockholm Metro station

Fittja
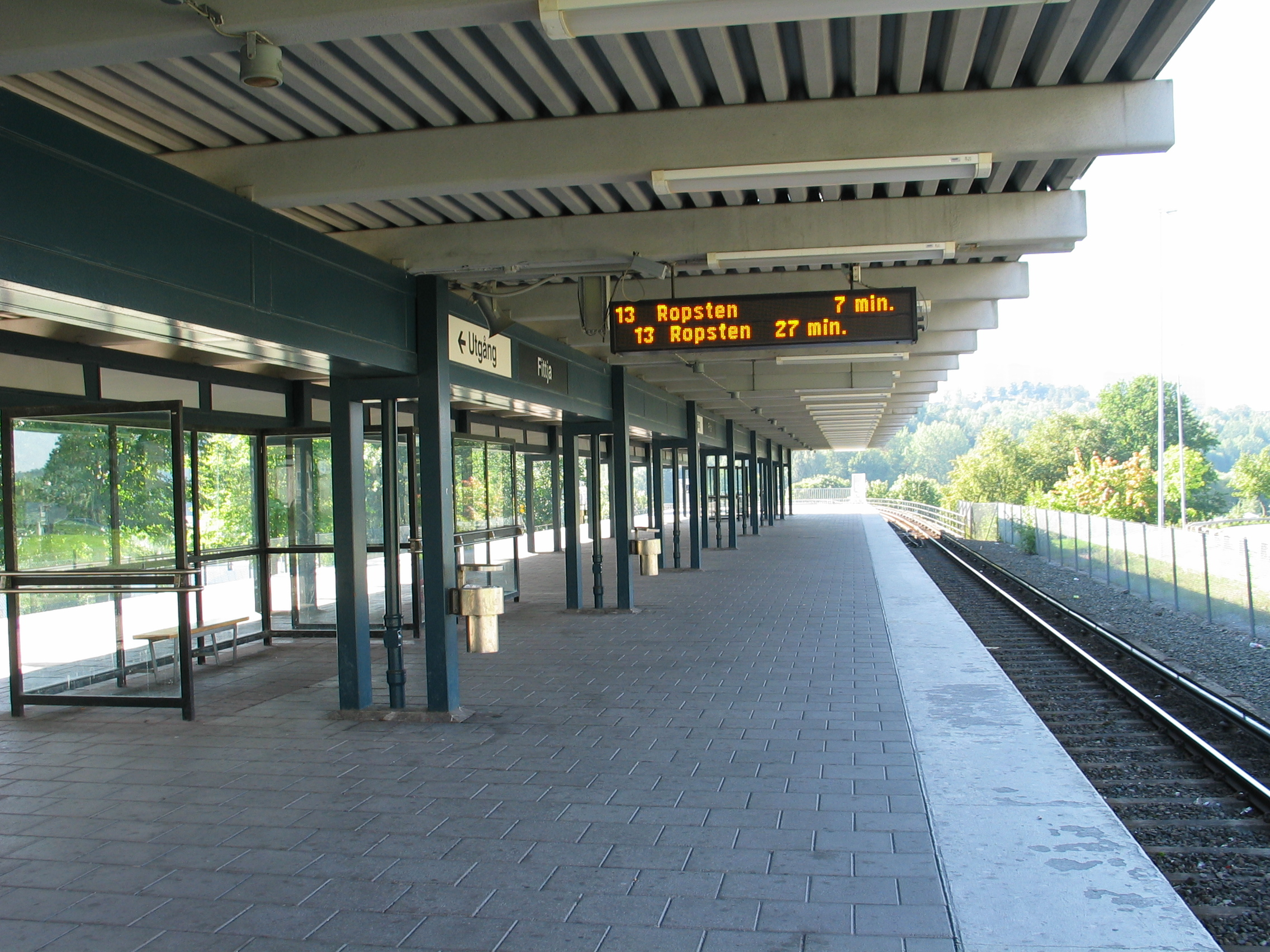

General information
- Coordinates: 59°14′51″N 17°51′39″E
- Elevation: 18.1 m (59 ft) above sea level
- System: Stockholm Metro station
- Owner: Storstockholms Lokaltrafik
- Platforms: 1 island platform
- Tracks: 2

Construction
- Structure type: At grade
- Accessible: Yes

Other information
- Station code: FIJ

History
- Opened: 1 October 1972; 54 years ago

Passengers
- 2019: 6,550 boarding per weekday

Services
Preceding station	Stockholm Metro	Following station
Alby towards Norsborg	Line 13	Masmo towards Ropsten
Location
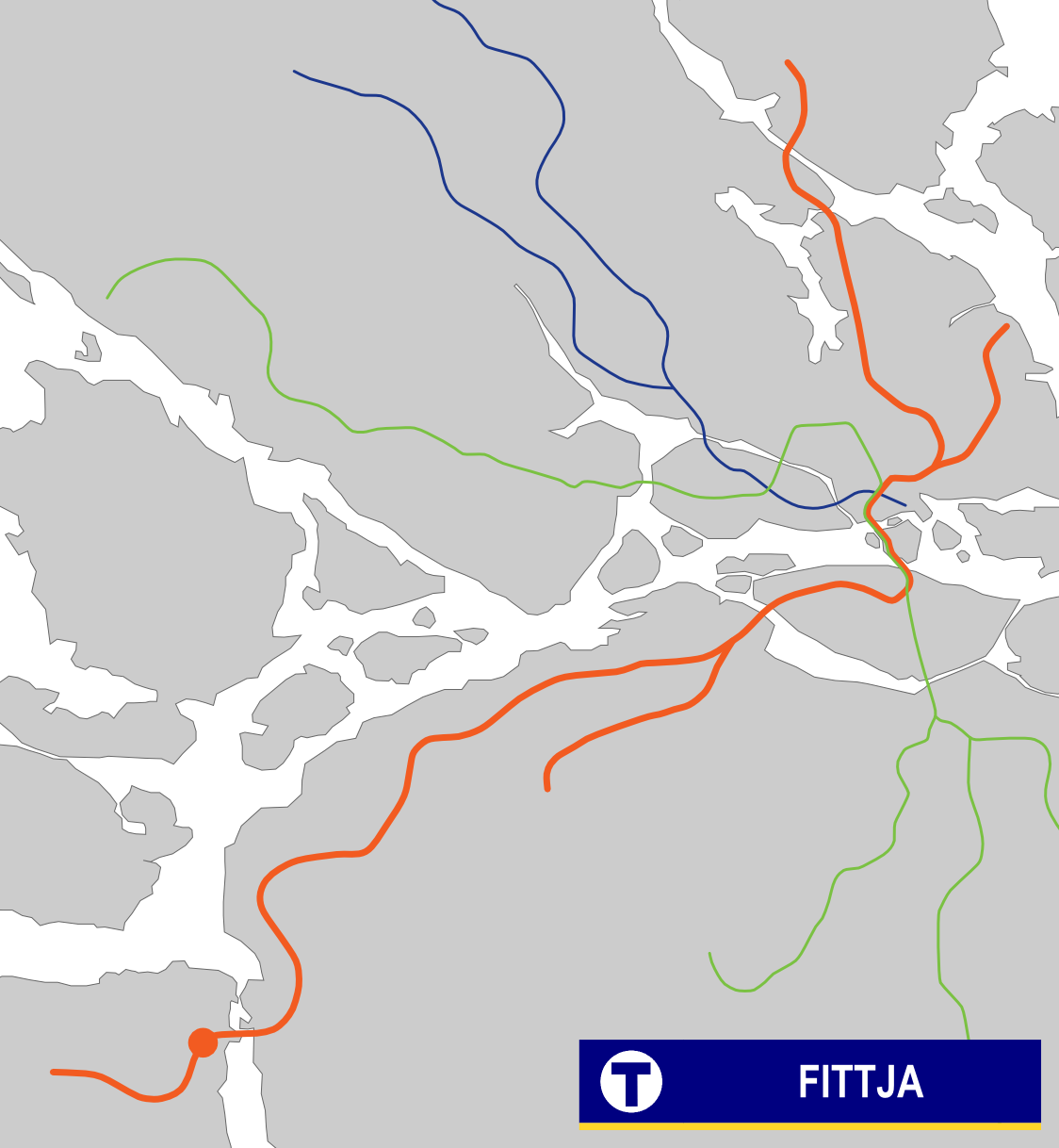

Fittja is a station on Line 13 of the Red Line of the Stockholm Metro, located in Fittja, Botkyrka Municipality, Sweden. The station opened on 1 October 1972 as the south-western terminus of the extension from Vårberg. On 12 January 1975, the line was extended further to Norsborg.

The station has an island platform that is situated at ground level, with the booking office and station access above the platforms and accessed from the overbridge on Värdshusvägen. Trains approach the station on viaducts from both directions, the one to the west linking to the tunnel to Alby station, whilst the one to the east crosses the Albysjön lake to Masmo station.

The station features a copy of the Carl Fredrik Reuterswärd bronze sculpture Non-Violence, the original of which was made in memory of John Lennon and is now located outside the United Nations headquarters in New York. Under the canopy roof of the entrance to Fittja centre hang two light sculptures made of opal-coloured plastic, created by Eva Rosengren.

== Gallery ==
Ticket barrier and access to platform

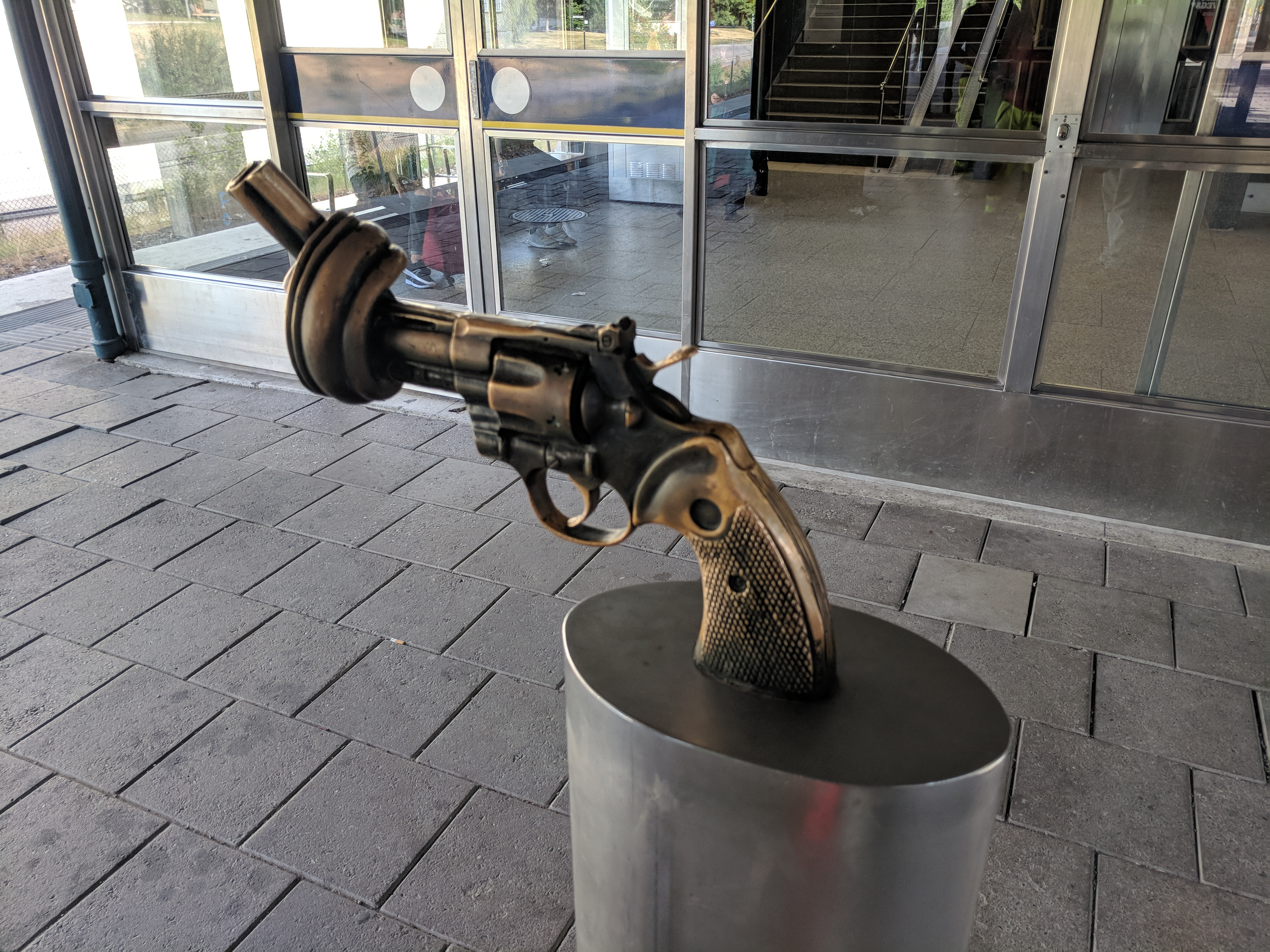
The station's copy of Non-Violence

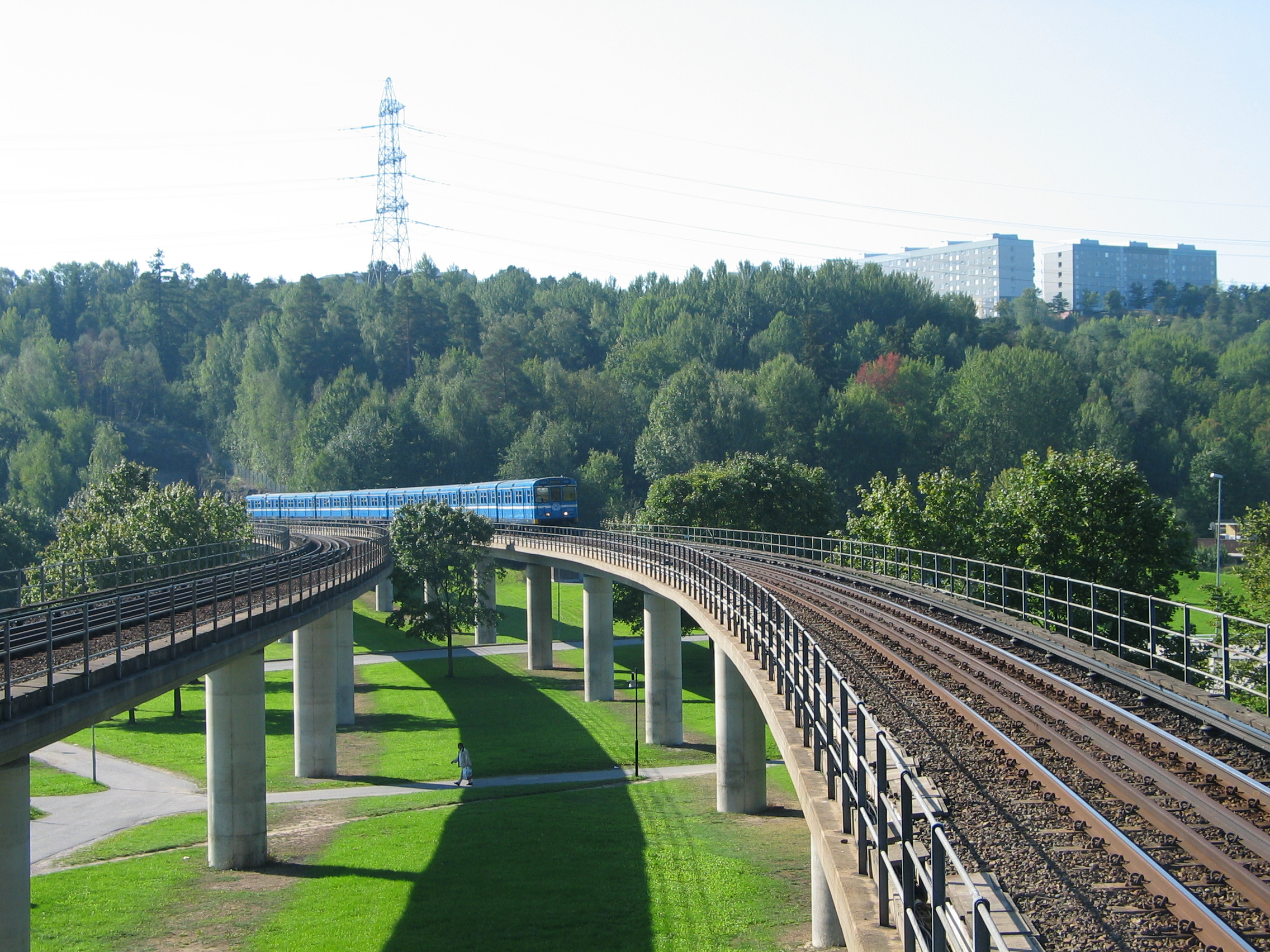
Approach to the station from west

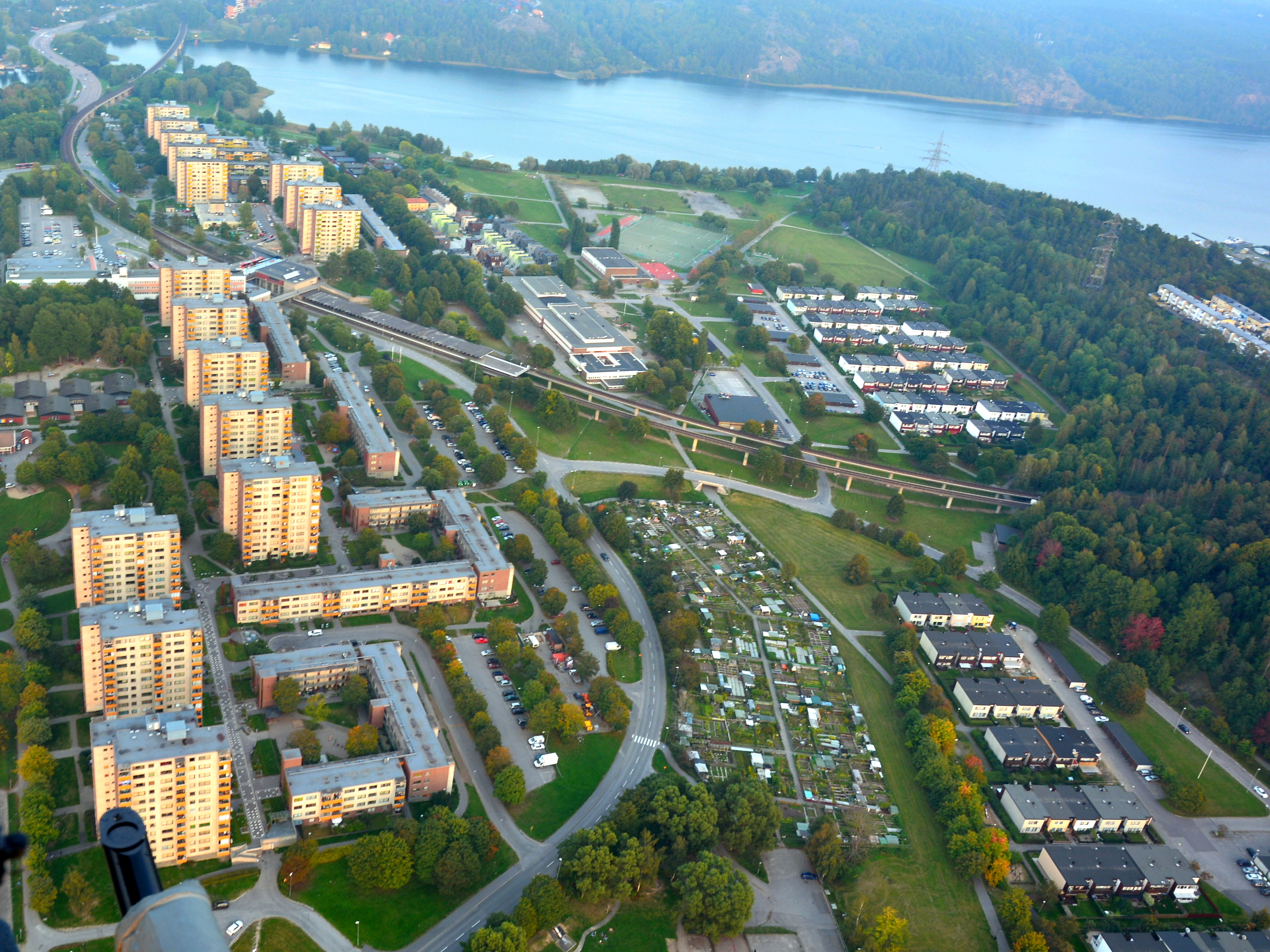
Aerial view of the station
