= Skärholmen metro station =

Stockholm Metro station

Skärholmen
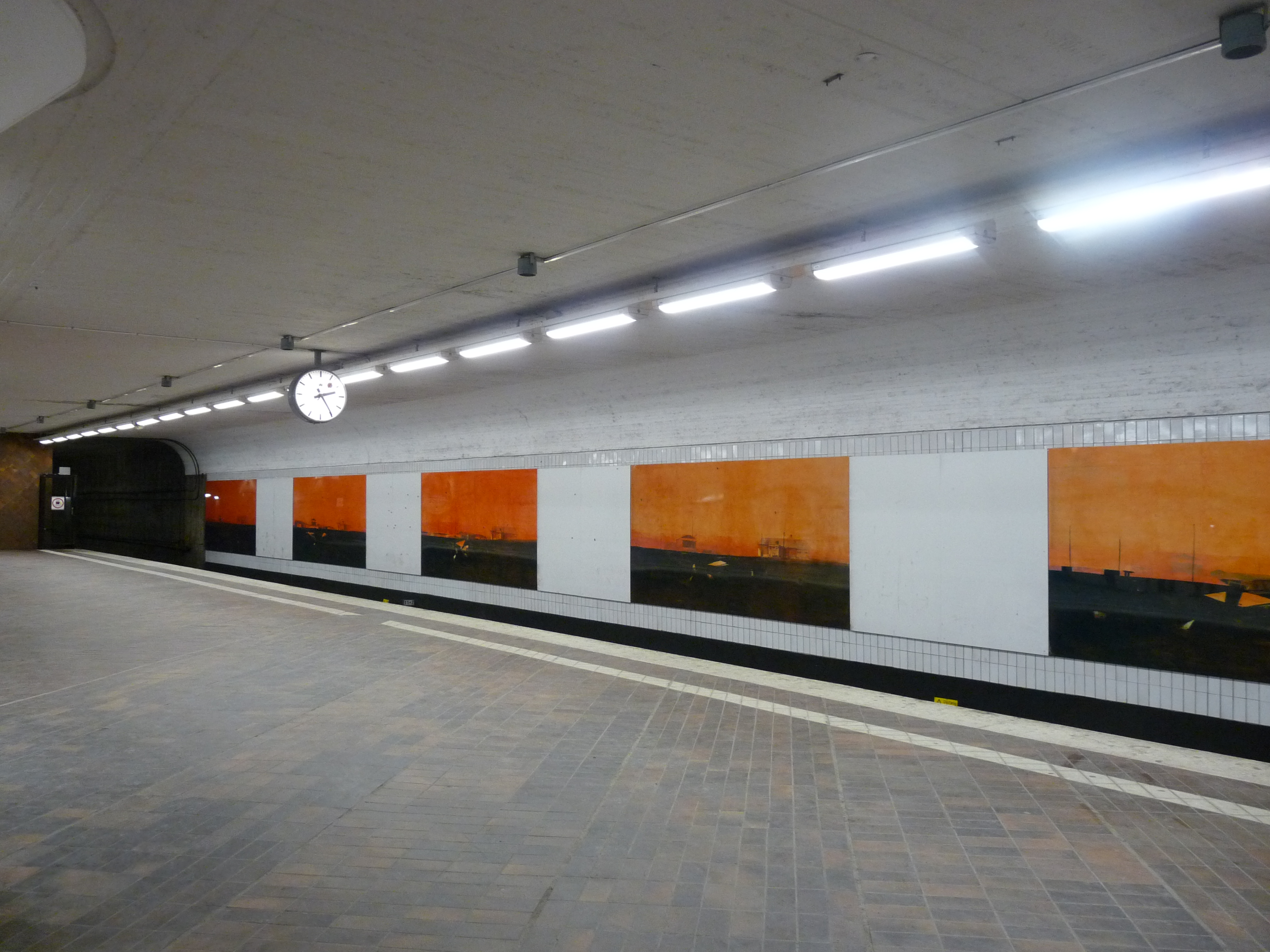

General information
- Coordinates: 59°16′38″N 17°54′25″E
- Elevation: 31.3 m (103 ft) above sea level
- System: Stockholm Metro station
- Owner: Storstockholms Lokaltrafik
- Platforms: 1 island platform
- Tracks: 2

Construction
- Structure type: Underground
- Depth: 5 m (16 ft)
- Accessible: Yes

Other information
- Station code: SKH

History
- Opened: 1 March 1967; 59 years ago

Passengers
- 2019: 13,650 boarding per weekday

Services
Preceding station	Stockholm Metro	Following station
Vårberg towards Norsborg	Line 13	Sätra towards Ropsten
Location
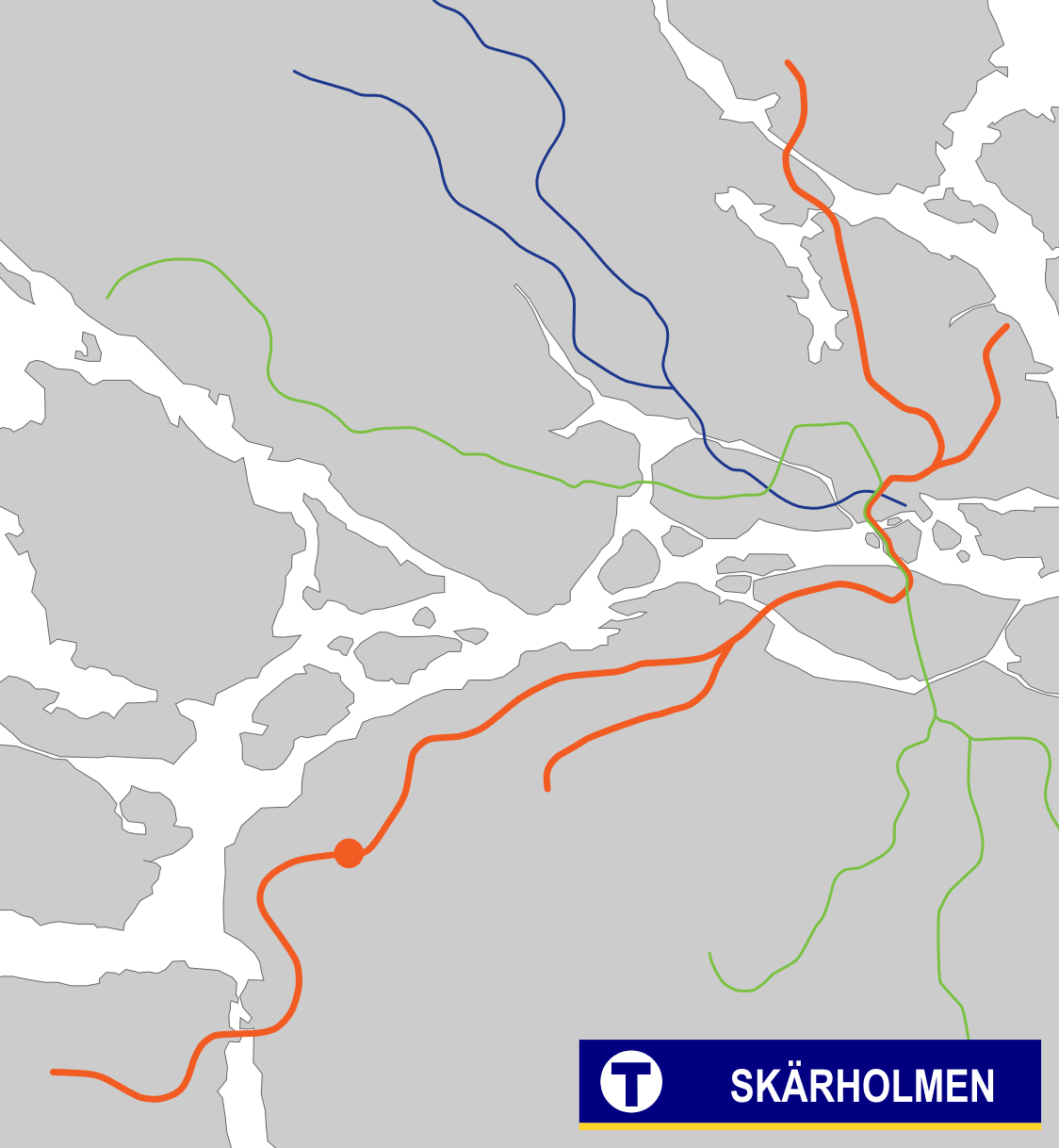

Skärholmen is a station on Line 13 of the Red Line of Stockholm Metro, located in the Skärholmen, Stockholm City, Sweden. The station opened on 1 March 1967 as the southern terminus of an extension from Sätra. On 2 December 1967, the line was extended to Vårberg. The station is 11.7 km (7.3 mi) from Slussen.

The station is situated below ground, with its island platform and tracks housed in a concrete box some 5 metres (16 ft) below ground. It has two ticket halls, each with its own street entrance and access to the platform via escalators, lifts and stairs. Adjacent to the station's eastern entrance is a small bus terminal.

The station is located next to the Skärholmen Centrum shopping center, which was opened in 1968. It is also the closest metro station to the Kungens Kurva area and its adjacent retail park, which is about 2 kilometres (1.2 mi) distant.

The station box features paintings by Ulf Wahlberg in a work entitled a place in New Mexico and dating from 1990. This depicts a place in New Mexico in the United States with 23 images from sunrise to sunset. The original paintings were replaced with reproductions in 2005.

Skärholmen is planned to become an interchange station with the future Spårväg syd light rail line, expected to open in 2031.

== Gallery ==
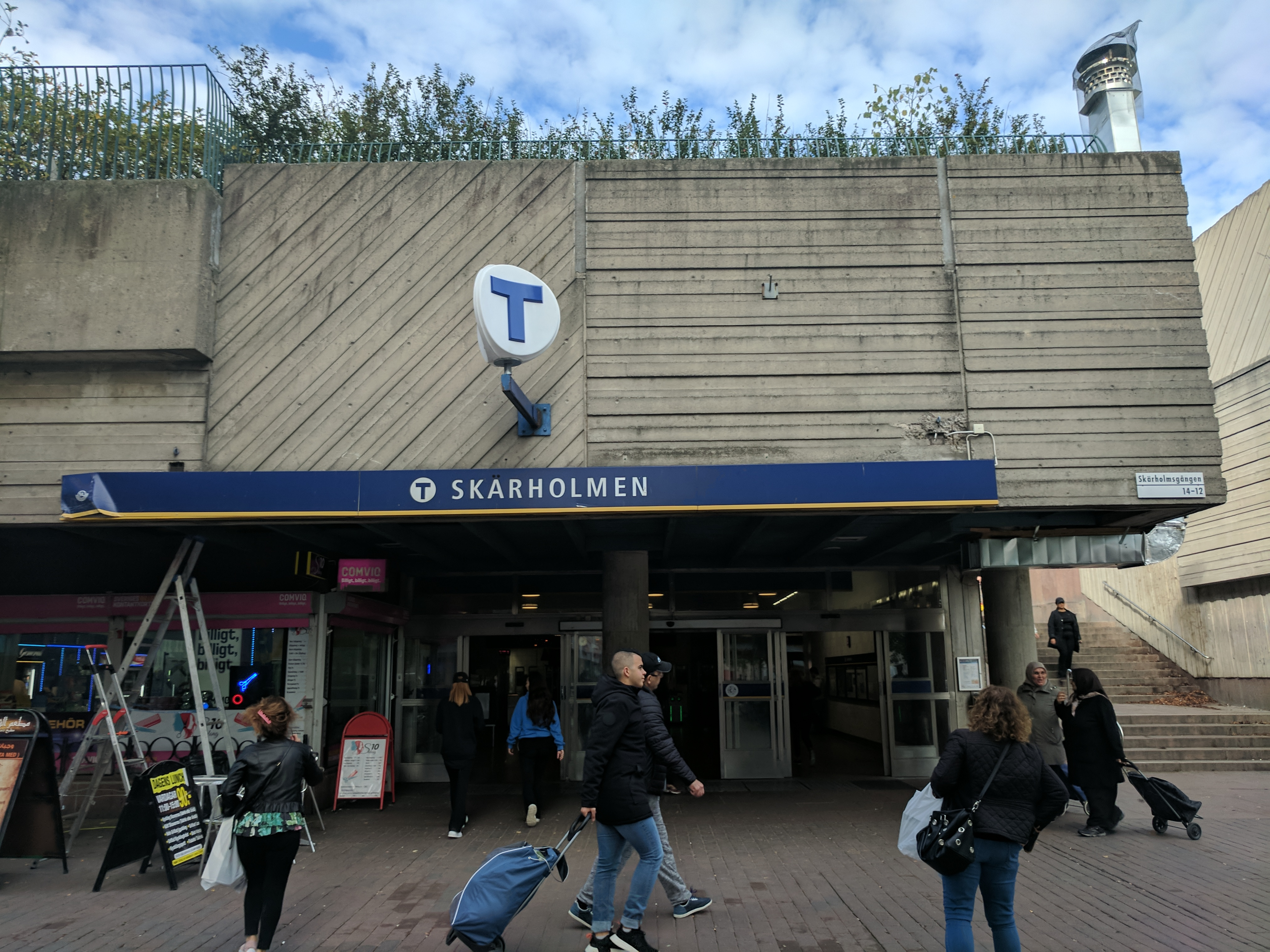
Entrance to station

Ticket hall and barriers

Plafform

Part of a place in New Mexico
