= Vårberg metro station =

Stockholm Metro station

Vårberg
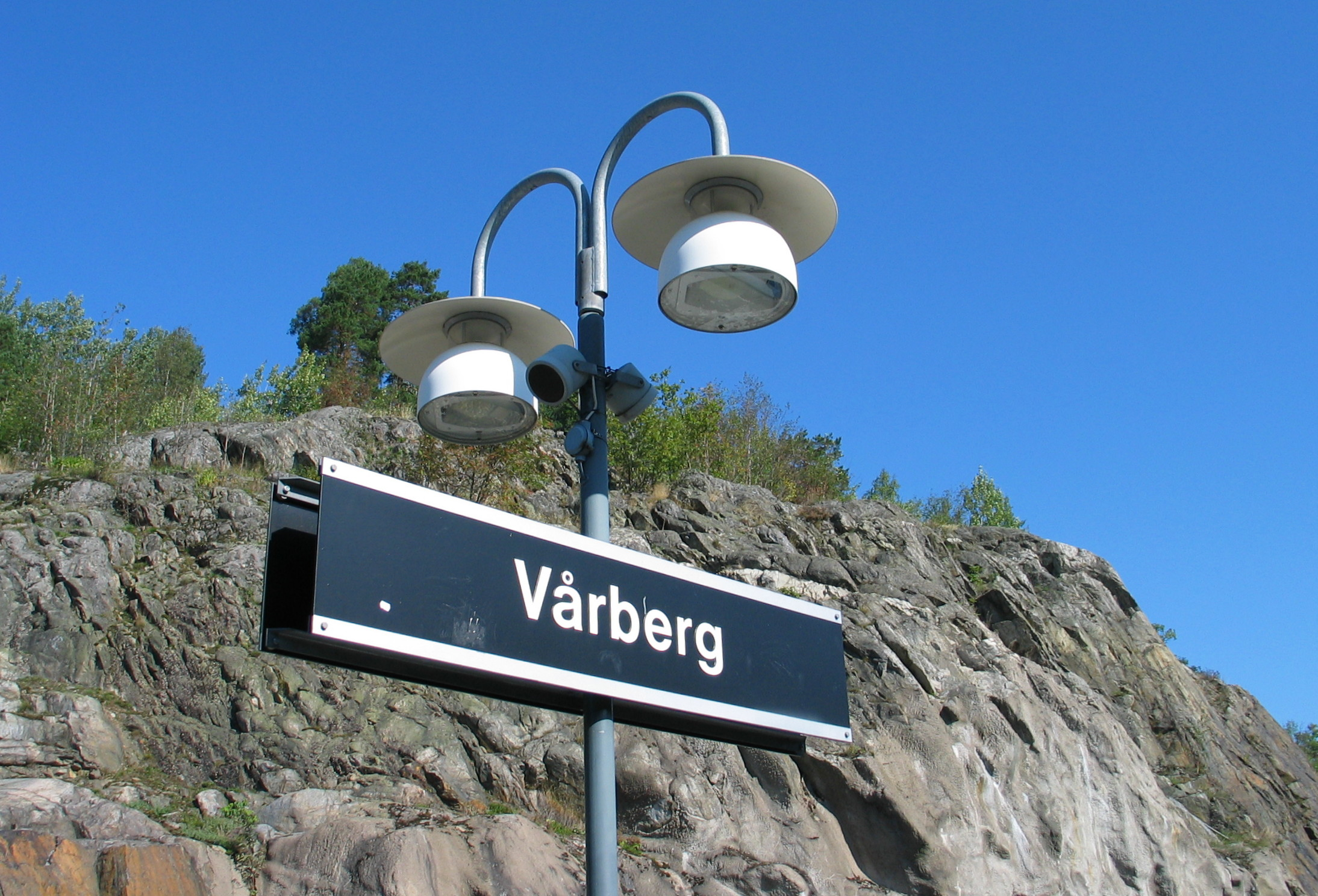

General information
- Coordinates: 59°16′33″N 17°53′27″E
- Elevation: 37.6 m (123 ft) above sea level
- System: Stockholm Metro station
- Owner: Storstockholms Lokaltrafik
- Platforms: 1 island platform
- Tracks: 2

Construction
- Structure type: At grade
- Accessible: Yes

Other information
- Station code: VÅB

History
- Opened: 2 December 1967; 58 years ago

Passengers
- 2019: 8,100 boarding per weekday

Services
Preceding station	Stockholm Metro	Following station
Vårby gård towards Norsborg	Line 13	Skärholmen towards Ropsten
Location
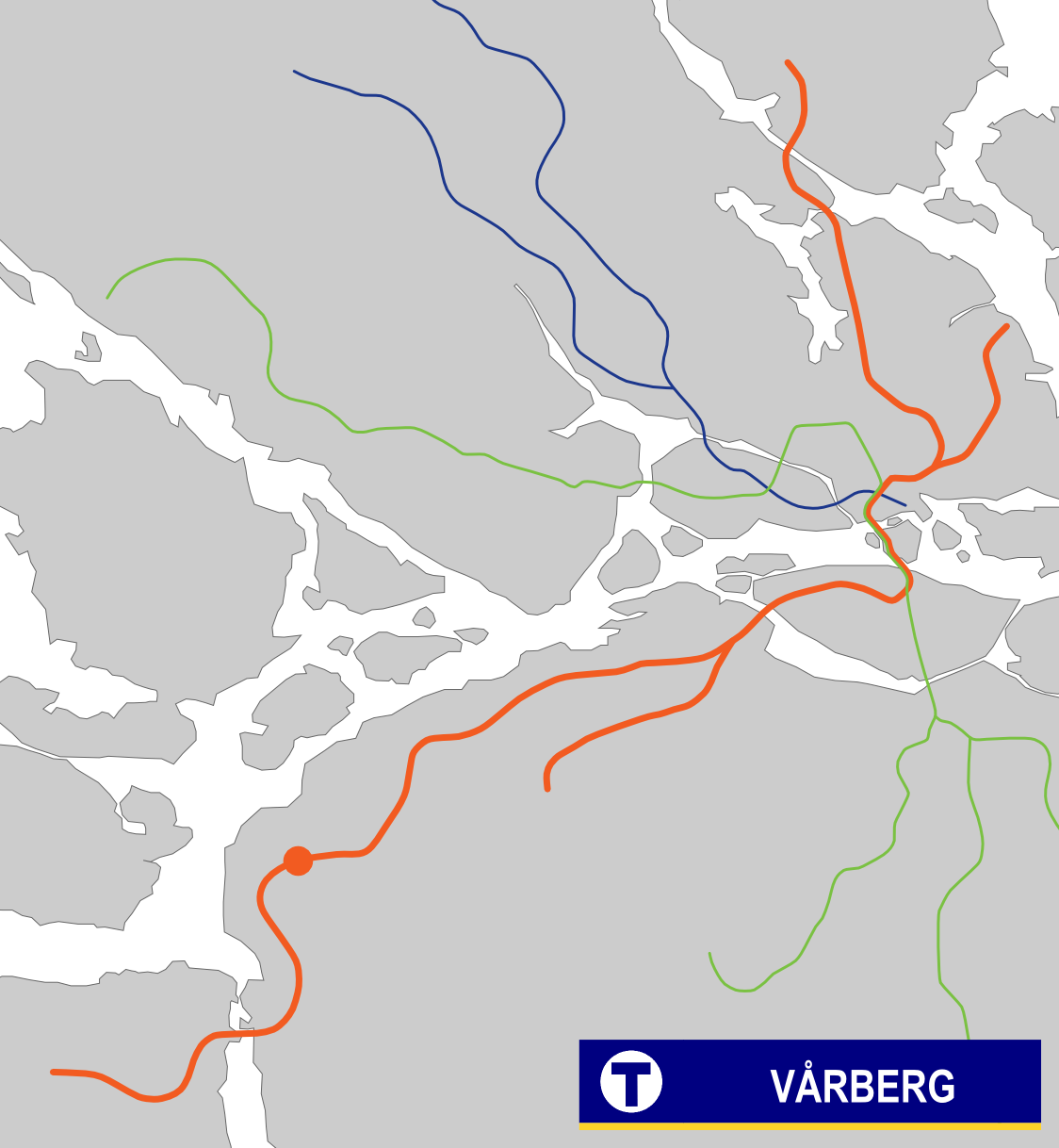

Vårberg is a station on Line 13 of the Red Line of the Stockholm Metro, located in Vårberg, Stockholm, Sweden. The station opened on 2 December 1967 as the southern terminus of an extension from Skärholmen. On 1 October 1972, the line was extended to Fittja. The station is 12.6 km (7.8 mi) from Slussen.

The station has an outdoor ground level island platform, which is accessed via a ramp, steps or lift from a ticket office and barrier line above the platform. This is, in turn, accessed on the level from within the Vårberg centrum shopping centre, into which the station is integrated. The trains pass under the shopping centre to the north of the station.

The subway building was designed by Hack Kampmann, who also designed the rest of the Vårberg centrum complex. The complex is to a modernist style and is green-labeled by the Stockholm City Museum, which means that the building is considered particularly valuable from a historical, cultural, environmental or artistic point of view.

As part of Art in the Stockholm Metro project, the station features ceramic wall works titled In Our Hands, created by Maria Ängquist Klyvare in 1996, with paintings depicting the hands of men, women and children.

== Gallery ==
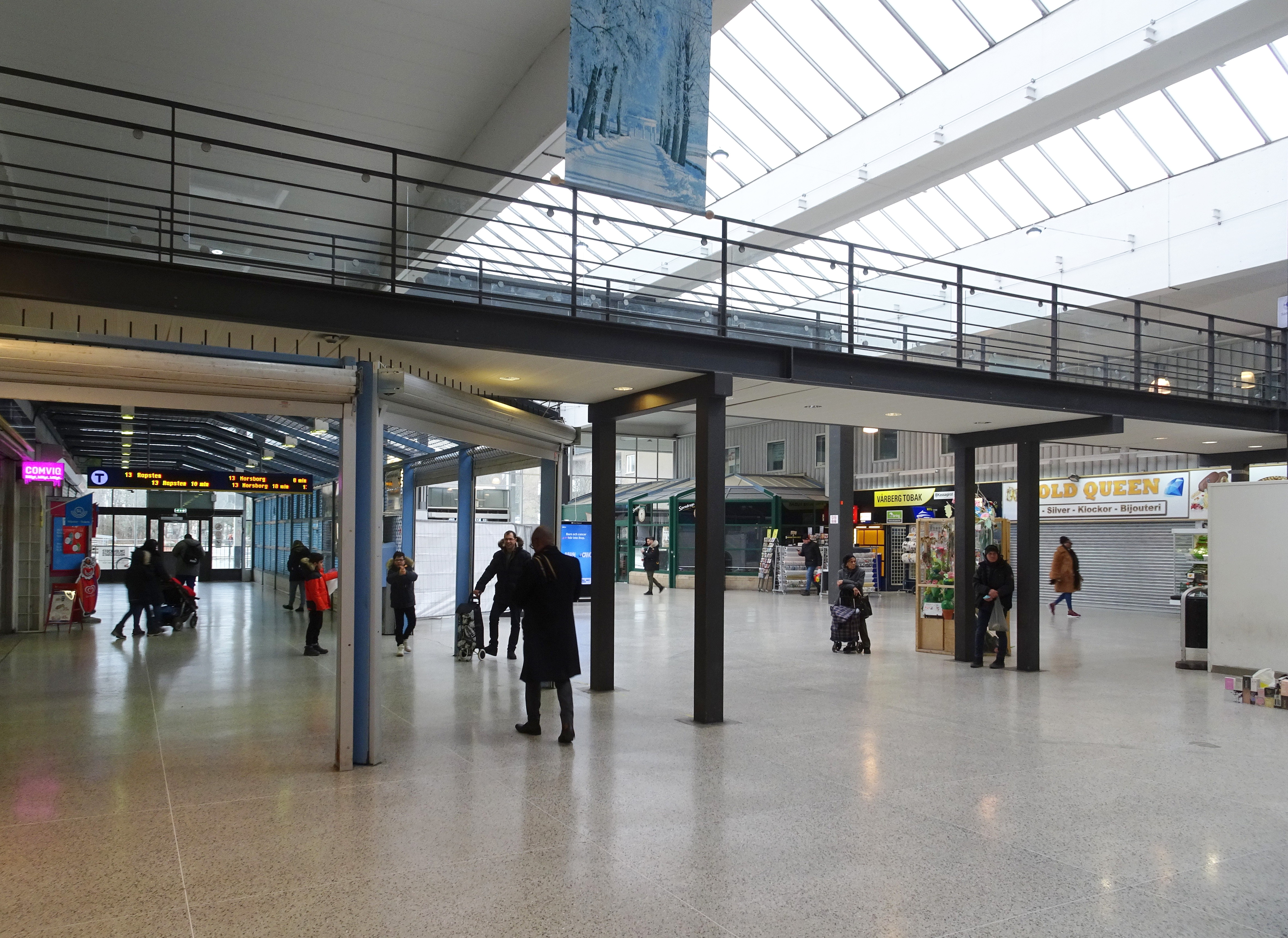
Entrance to station (left) from centre

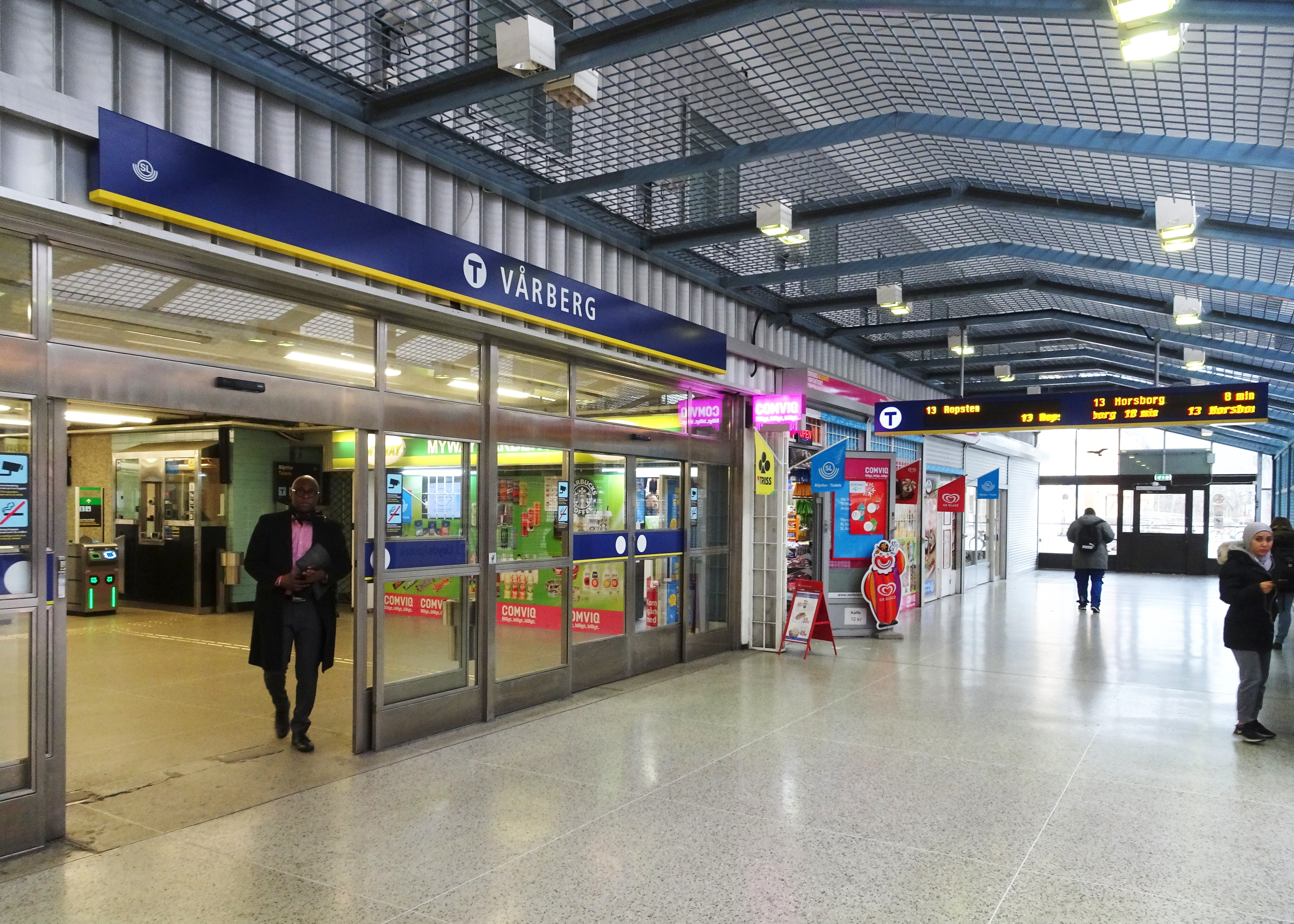
A closer view of the entrance

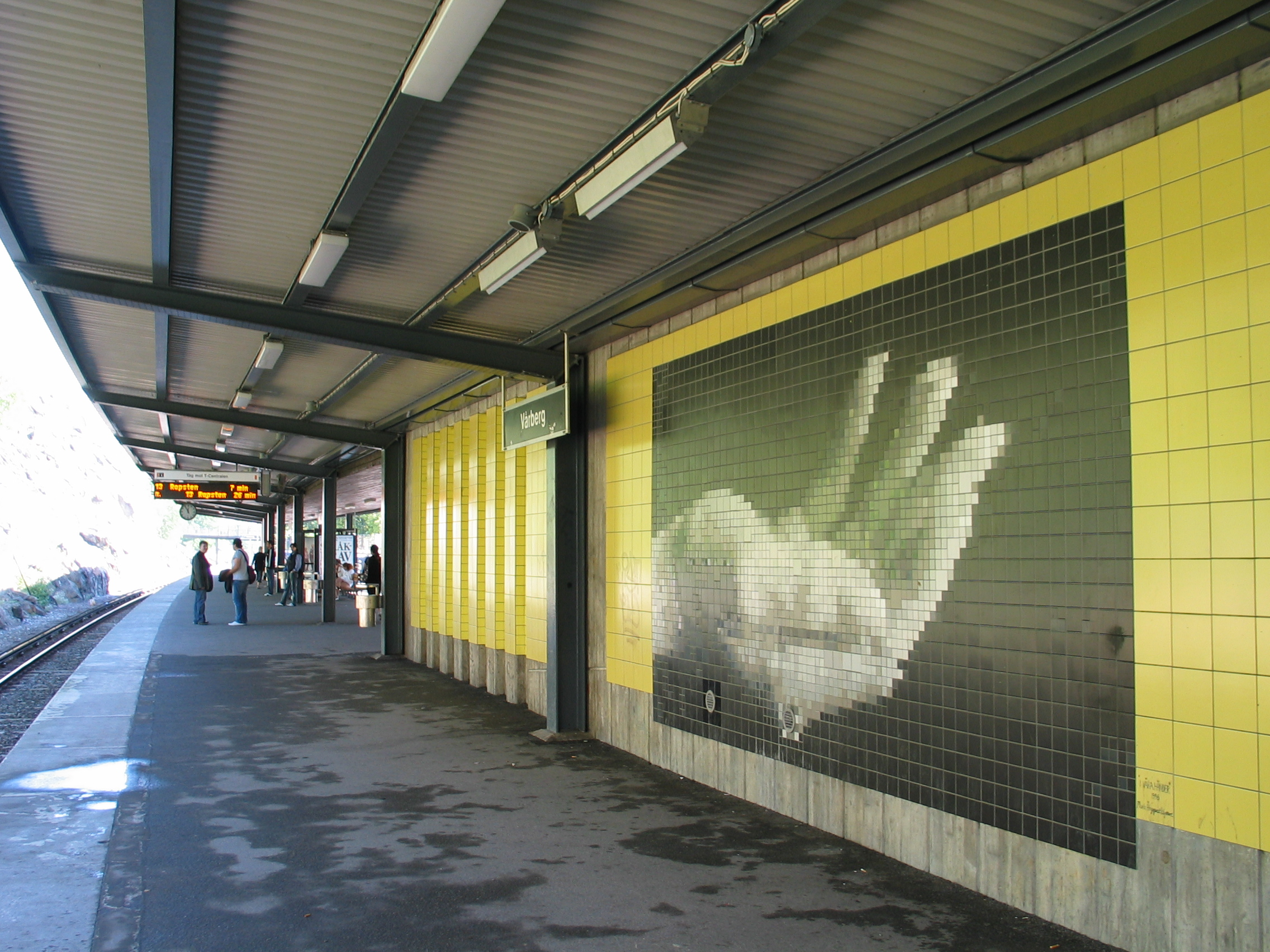
Plafform and artwork near entrance

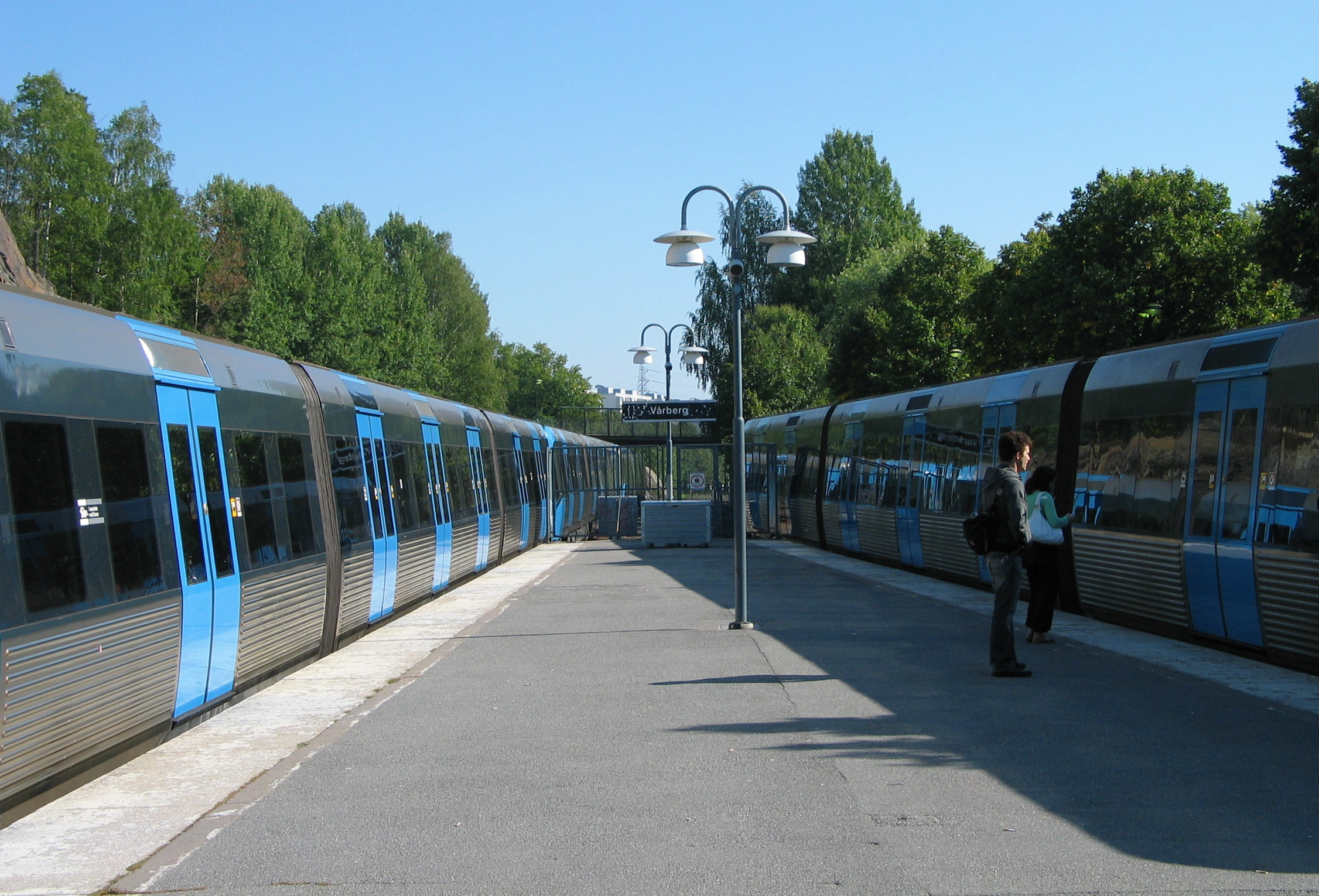
The further end of the platform
