= Red Line (Stockholm Metro) =

Metro line in Stockholm, Sweden

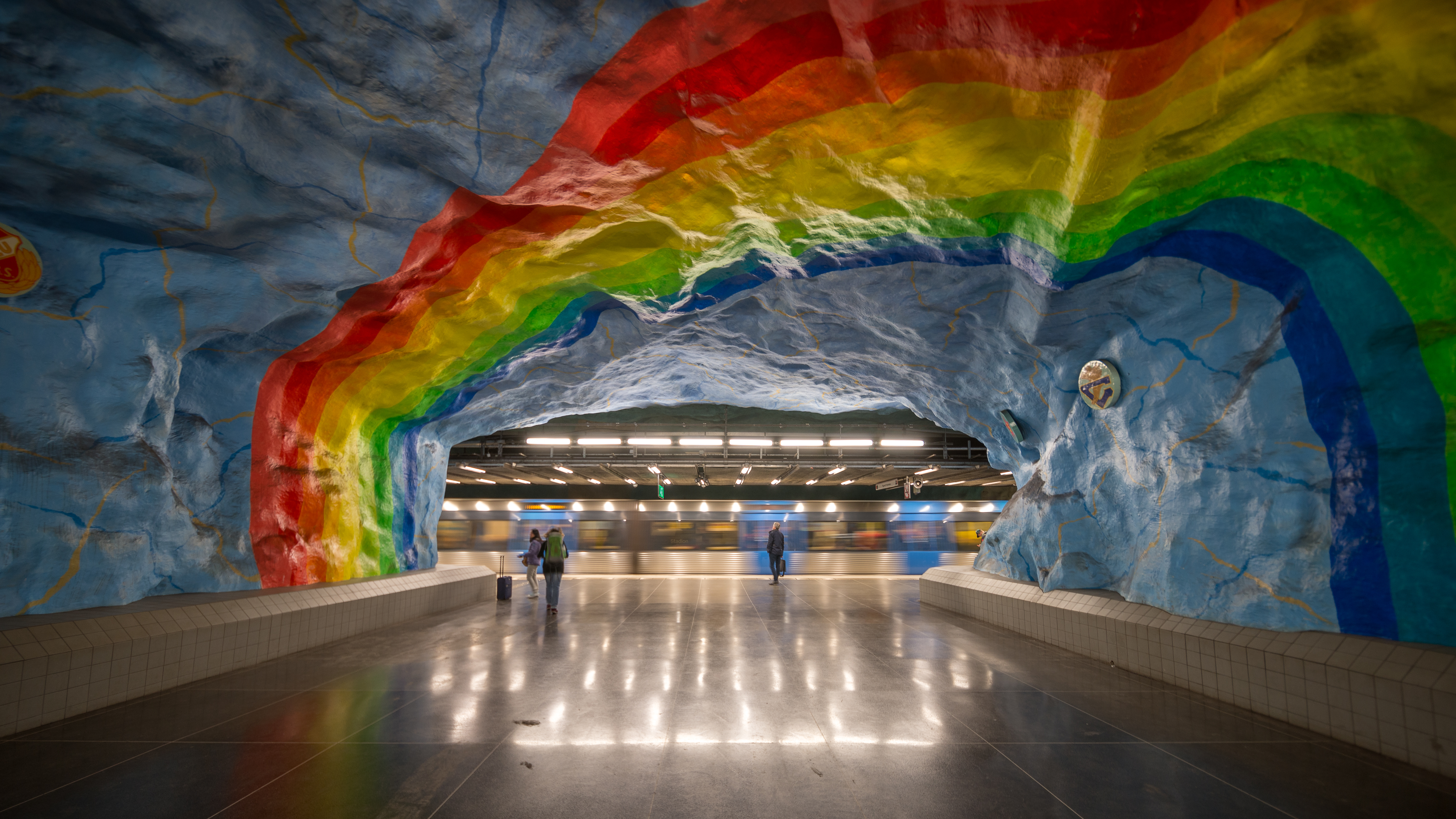
- Stadion station

Overview
- Native name: Röda linjen
- Locale: Stockholm, Sweden
- Stations: 36

Service
- Type: Rapid transit
- System: Storstockholms Lokaltrafik (SL)
- Services: Ropsten–Norsborg; Mörby centrum–Fruängen
- Operator: Connecting Stockholm (ticketing by SL)
- Depot(s): Norsborg, Nyboda
- Rolling stock: C20 and C30
- Daily ridership: 507,850 (2018)

History
- Opened: 5 April 1964; 62 years ago
- Last extension: 1978

Technical
- Line length: 41.2 km (25.6 mi)
- Number of tracks: 2
- Character: Underground subway and at–grade-separated
- Track gauge: 1,435 mm (4 ft 8 1/2 in) standard gauge
- Electrification: 650 V DC third rail
- Operating speed: 80 km/h (50 mph)

The Red Line (Swedish: Röda linjen; officially Metro 2, but called Tub 2 ("Tube 2", or abbreviation for "Tunnelbana 2") internally) is one of the three Stockholm Metro lines. It has a total of 36 stations, of which four are cut and cover, 16 are tunneled, and 15 are on the surface. The line is a total of 41.238 kilometres (25.624 mi) long. It consists of four branches with terminals in Fruängen and Norsborg in the southwest and Mörby centrum and Ropsten in the northeast.

The "Red Line" designation began in the late-1970s, and officially only since the 1990s, and comes from the fact that the route has been marked in red on Storstockholms Lokaltrafik's maps at least since the 1970s. Previously, the Red Line had been coloured orange on the system map, but as new maps were printed with changes, the colour became increasingly redder in the 1980s.

== History ==
The line was opened on 5 April 1964, between T-Centralen and Fruängen and Örnsberg. Several more sections were opened between 1965 and 1967, while the last extension to Mörby centrum was completed in 1978. Within Stockholm's inner city, the Red Line was built independently of the street network, and at a greater depth than the Green Line, which was constructed mainly under roadways.

The Mälarhöjden-Liljeholmen section had its origins as the Södra Förstadsbanan tramway, dating from the 1910s. The somewhat newer Liljeholmen-Midsommarkransen section was built primarily on its own right of way, as the area was not densely populated. However, there were level crossings and subsequent sections were built in tunnel before the start of the Metro. Today not much is left of the original tram route.

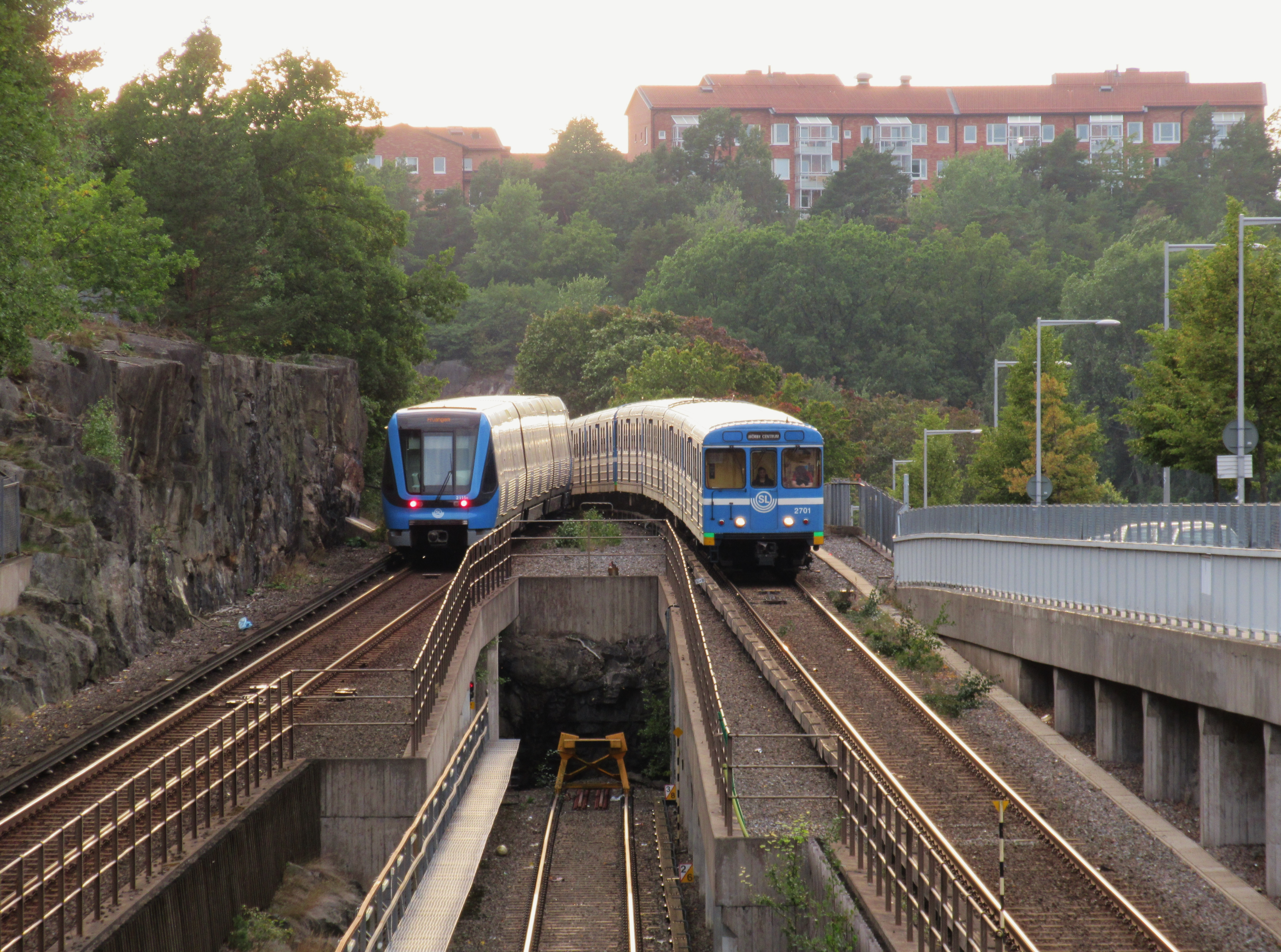
C20 and C6 type trains southwest of Telefonplan station

The Telefonplan–Fruängen section (lines 14 and 17) was built in 1946–1956 as a pre-metro, with high-level centre subway platforms and shorter, low-level tram platforms at the sides. This section is the same today. For the extension beyond T-Centralen, tunnels had already been built when the Green Line was built there, mostly by the cut-and-cover method. T-Central station was opened in 1957 for the Green Line, while the Red Line platforms opened in 1964. The route between Fruängen and Mörby centrum and back was originally numbered Line 24, but was renumbered 14 around 2001.

The Liljeholmen-Fruängen section underwent major renovation during the summer of 2006. The service was temporarily replaced by a bus route.

=== Other development plans ===
The 1965 Greater Stockholm Metro plan proposed to run the Red Line further north, from Östermalmstorg to Hägernäs. Stations were to be at Djursholms Ösby, Enebyberg, Roslags Näsby, Täby centrum, and Viggbyholm, terminating at Hägernäs. An additional station at Albano (between Östermalmstorg and Djursholms Ösby) was discussed. Another alternative was a completely new metro line, instead of using the previously built existing railway tracks.

A 1975 proposal would have extended the Metro north replacing the Roslagsbanan, but discussions followed and in 1976 Stockholm County Council decided that the Roslagsbanan would remain; however, in 1978 the decision was rescinded. The following year the County Council decided that a surface rapid transit line should be extended to Täby centrum. Both Täby Municipality and Vallentuna Municipality held referendums on 23 March 1980 to decide if a metro should be built, resulting in a "no" vote. The County Administrative Board rejected the results—as public transport was a county issue not a municipal decision—but the municipalities refused to create detailed plans for an extension. In October 1980, the county council decided to continue with plans for the Metro, but ultimately chose instead to in investments to the Roslagsbanan.

For the other northern branch, which today ends in Ropsten, the proposal was to carry the Metro on a separate rail-only bridge over Lilla Värtan and then in tunnel to a new station in Lidingö Centrum. Here the possibility for a further extension beyond Lidingö were also raised, with Baggeby, Bodal and Bogesundslandet as possible terminals. (At that time Bogesundslandet was intended to be developed with housing.) In 1966 the Lidingö City Council decided in principle to extend the Metro to Lidingö, but the plans were shelved. The City Planning Office produced sketches of the Metro bridge in connection with the design of the new Lidingö bridge in 1971. Plans for a Metro bridge again became relevant after damage was discovered in 2004 to the Old Lidingöbron, which would require its replacement. Nonertheless, the choice was made to invest in a new tram bridge, which would be cheaper and in general would provide similar travel times to Stockholm. It will also allow the Lidingö Line to be extended to Spårväg City.

In the south there were plans to extend the Fruängen branch to Huddinge centrum, Huddinge Hospital and Flemingsberg. Land for the right-of-way was protected, but no work has ever been done.

=== Opening dates ===
Section	Date
Örnsberg–T-Centralen–Fruängen	Sunday April 5, 1964
T-Centralen–Östermalmstorg; Örnsberg–Sätra	Sunday May 16, 1965
Sätra–Skärholmen	Wednesday March 1, 1967
Östermalmstorg–Ropsten	Saturday September 2, 1967
Skärholmen-Vårberg	Saturday December 2, 1967
Vårberg–Fittja	Sunday October 1, 1972
Östermalmstorg–Tekniska högskolan	Sunday September 30, 1973
Tekniska högskolan–Universitetet; Fittja–Norsborg	Sunday January 12, 1975
Universitetet–Mörby centrum	Sunday January 29, 1978

== Route and stations ==
The Red Line is served by two routes—lines 13 and 14—and carried 507,850 passengers per working day (2019), or approximately 128 million per year (2005).

Line 13 runs between Norsborg and Ropsten, while Line 14 operates Fruängen-Mörby centrum. Regular daytime service is a 5-minute headway on Line 14 between Mörby center and Liljeholmen, and 10 minutes at other times. During rush hours there is a 5-minute service between Alby and Sätra-Ropsten and also along Line 14, providing a train every 2.5 minutes on the joint stretch between Östermalmstorg and Liljeholmen (i.e. 24 trains per hour).

The longest tunnels are between Gamla stan and Bergshamra (8.5 km (5.3 mi)), and Gamla stan to Gärdet (4.5 km (2.8 mi), 2.4 km (1.5 mi) in common with the Green Line).

The ten busiest Red Line stations (by number of boardings on a winter weekday in 2019) are:

Rank	Station	Passengers
1	T-Centralen	88,750
2	Slussen	39,550
3	Östermalmstorg	38,550
4	Liljeholmen	36,350
5	Tekniska högskolan	25,750
6	Ropsten	20,200
7	Hornstull	18,500
8	Karlaplan	17,650
9	Mariatorget	17,100
10	Gamla stan	15,650
