= 2025 Stockholm bus crash =

Transport accident in Sweden

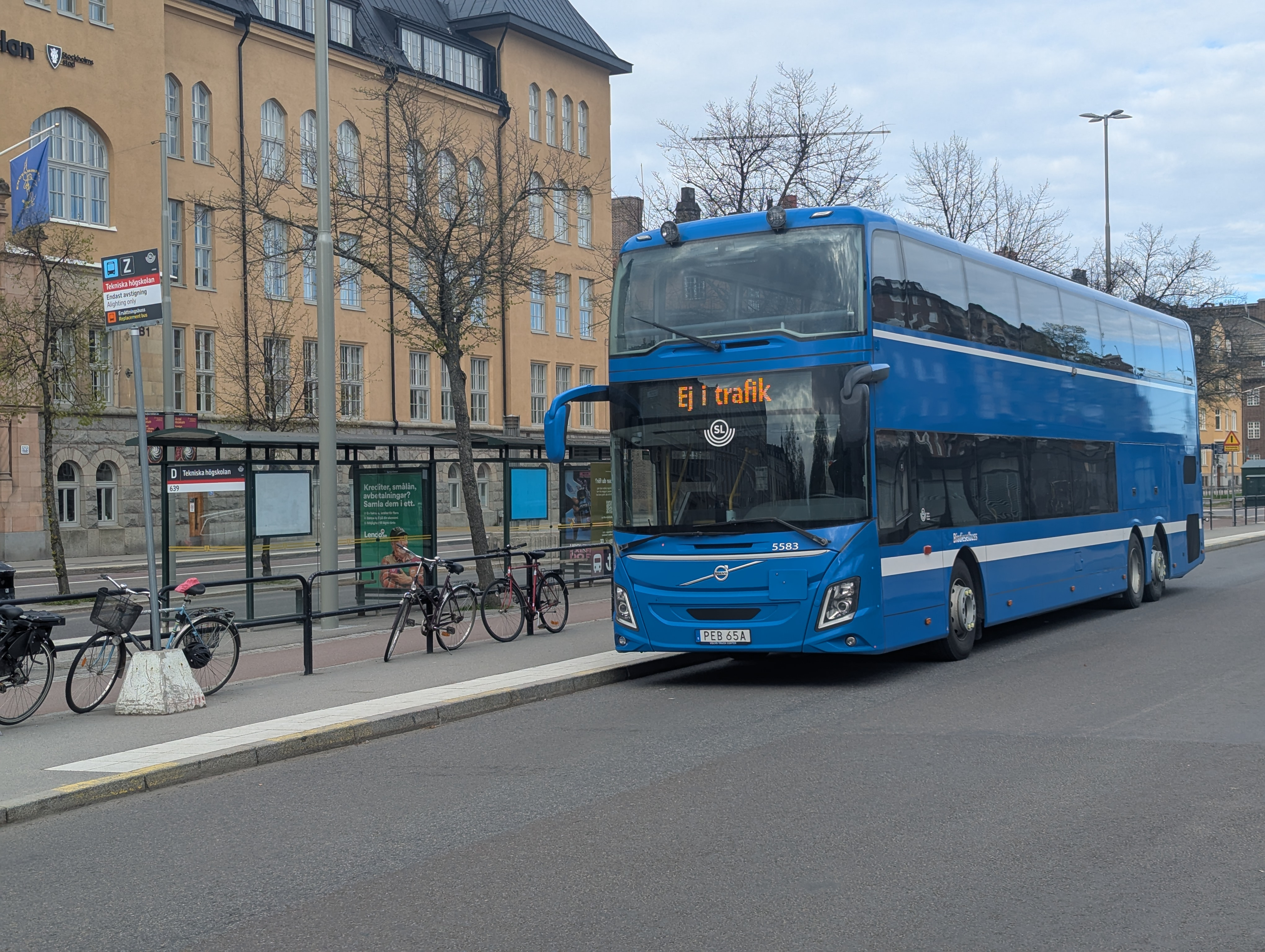
- The same bus model at the same stop on another occasion, May 2025.

Details
- Date: 14 November 2025 c. 3:20 pm CET (UTC+1)
- Location: Tekniska Högskolan bus terminal, Stockholm, Sweden
- Coordinates: 59°20′44.09″N 18°4′15.78″E
- Operator: Transdev Sverige AB
- Incident type: Bus crash
- Cause: Unknown

Statistics
- Vehicles: Volvo 9700 DD
- Deaths: 3 people
- Injured: 3 people

On 14 November 2025, a bus crashed in Stockholm, Sweden. The bus swerved across onto the sidewalk and rammed a bus stop at the Tekniska Högskolan station. Three people were killed and three others were injured in the accident.

== Course of events ==
The bus driver had been driving since 1:00 pm and was about to take a break when the accident occurred. At 3:20 pm, the bus drove unexpectedly onto the sidewalk and rammed six commuters, a bus stop, and several trees before crashing into a lamppost. The first emergency call to SOS Alarm was received at 3:24 pm, reporting of a bus accident at the Tekniska Högskolan station. The degree of damage was unclear at the time. The driver was arrested at the scene and was suspected of gross causing of death and bodily injury. Later that evening, SL had gone into state of readiness. Four people, including the driver, was transported to hospital during the evening. At 8:30 pm, the Swedish Police Authority confirmed that three people were killed by the accident.

== Aftermath ==
The cause of the accident is still unknown and under investigation. SL and Transdev confirmed that the vehicle involved was a Volvo 9700 DD double-decker bus, which had been operating on Line 676 shortly before, and had approved vehicle inspection. After the accident, the Swedish Accident Investigation Authority was summoned to investigate the vehicle. The following day, the arrested driver was subsequently released; but suspicions of crime still remained, and Prime Minister Ulf Kristersson and his wife visited the site to honor the victims later on the evening. A week after the accident, prosecutors announced that no indication that the driver had acted intentionally.
