= Tekniska högskolan =

Tekniska högskolan may refer to:

- Helsinki University of Technology, a university in Helsinki, Finland; in Swedish, Tekniska högskolan
- Royal Institute of Technology, a university in Stockholm, Sweden, called Kungliga Tekniska högskolan or KTH in Swedish, but sometimes referred to as simply Tekniska högskolan
- Tekniska högskolan metro station, a station in the Stockholm Metro
