= Stadion metro station =

Stockholm Metro station

Stadion
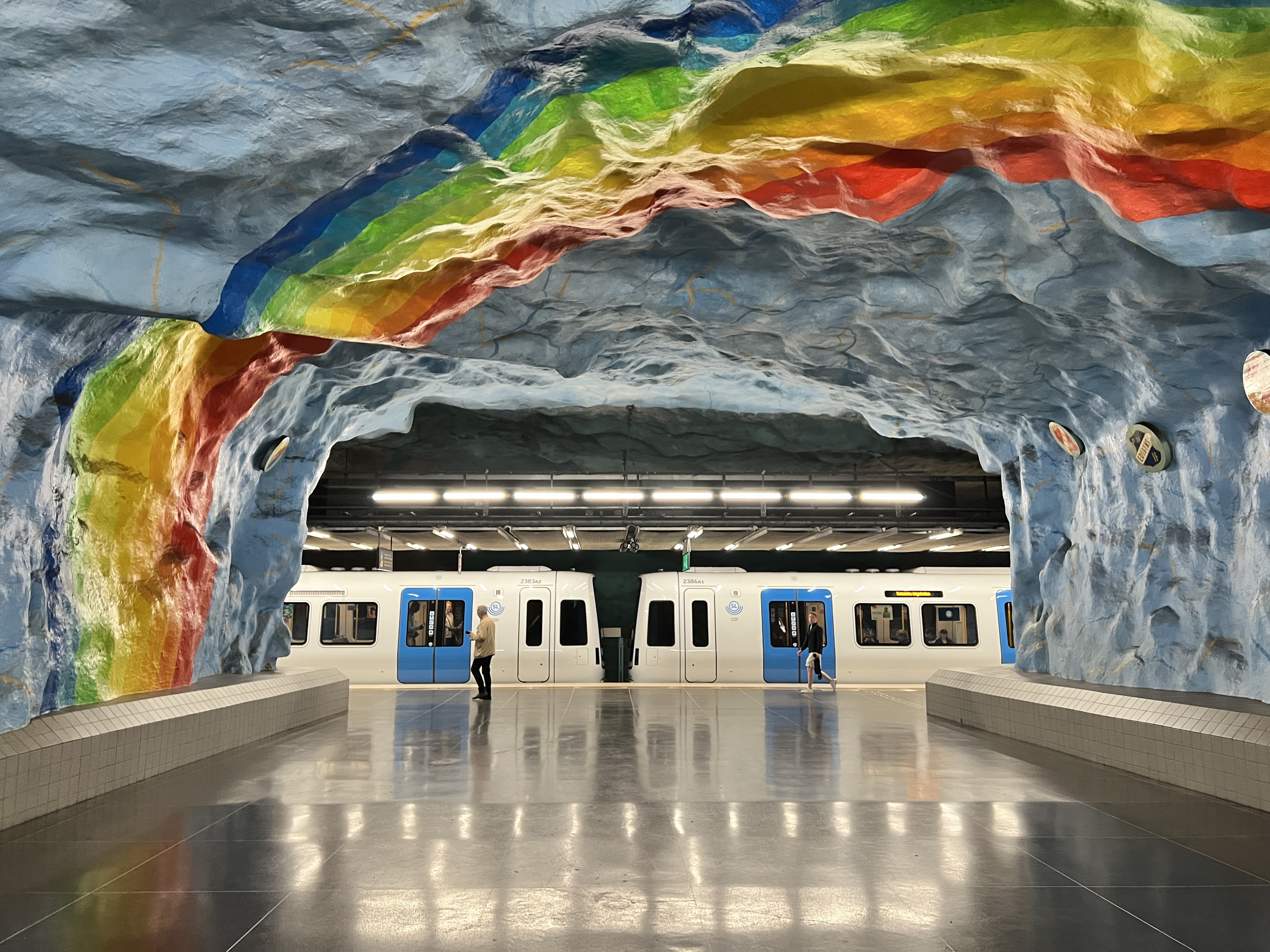

General information
- Location: Östermalm, Stockholm; Sweden
- Coordinates: 59°20′35″N 18°4′52″E
- Elevation: 4.4 m (14 ft) below sea level
- System: Stockholm Metro station
- Owner: Storstockholms Lokaltrafik
- Platforms: 1 island platform
- Tracks: 2

Construction
- Structure type: Underground
- Depth: 35 m (115 ft) below ground
- Accessible: Yes

Other information
- Station code: STD

History
- Opened: 30 September 1973; 53 years ago

Passengers
- 2019: 9,400 boarding per weekday

Services
| Preceding station | Stockholm Metro | Following station |
|---|---|---|
| Östermalmstorg towards Fruängen | Line 14 | Tekniska högskolan towards Mörby centrum |
Location
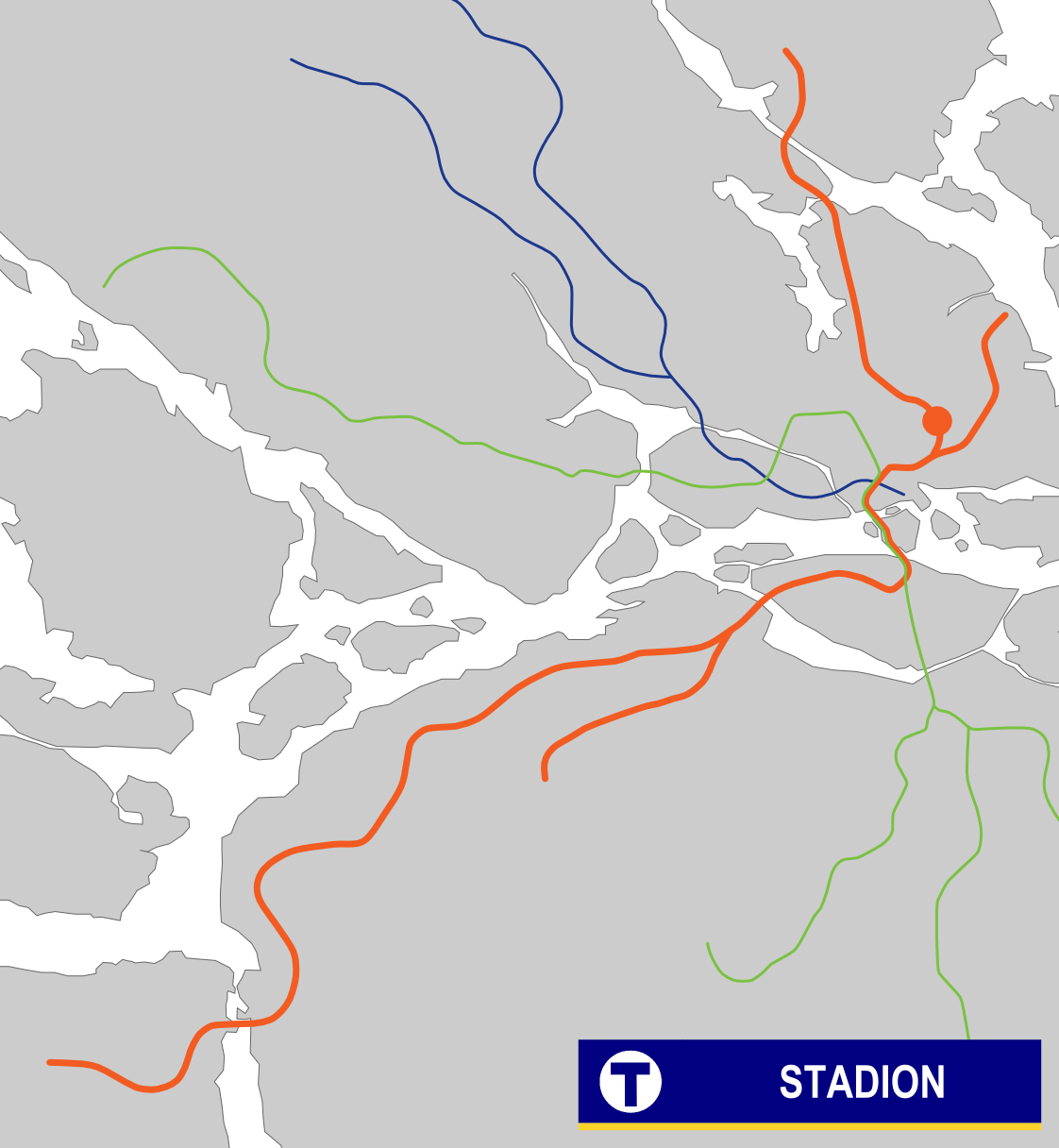

Stadion is a station on Line 14 of the Red Line of the Stockholm Metro, located near the Stockholm Olympic Stadium in the district of Östermalm, Stockholm, Sweden. The station was opened on 30 September 1973 as part of the extension from Östermalmstorg to Tekniska högskolan. The station was decorated by artists Enno Hallek and Åke Pallarp.
