= Enno Hallek =

Swedish artist and academic (1931–2025)

- Born: 7 November 1931; Rohuküla, Estonia
- Died: 31 December 2025 (aged 94); Stockholm, Sweden
- Education: Royal Swedish Academy of Fine Arts
- Occupation: Artist
- Style: Pop art, conceptualism, postmodernism

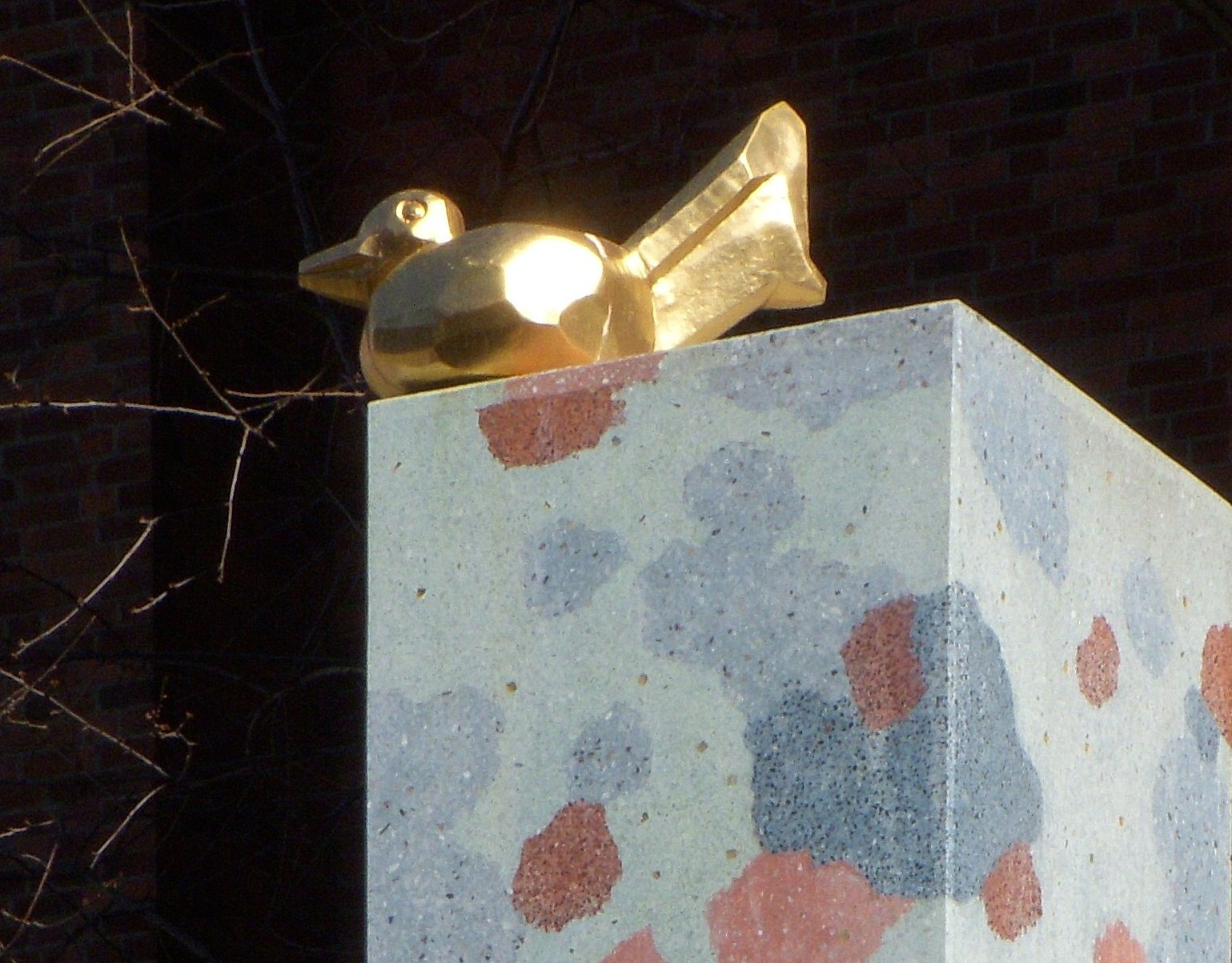
Enno Hallek's Pippi L from 1998 outside Astrid Lindgren Children's Hospital (part of Karolinska University Hospital)

Enno Hallek (7 November 1931 – 31 December 2025) was a Swedish artist and academic. He and his family moved to Sweden from Soviet-occupied Estonia as refugees in 1943. He was educated at the Royal Swedish Academy of Fine Arts, and had his first solo exhibition in 1963 at Konstnärshuset in Stockholm. He was a professor of arts at the Royal Swedish Academy of Fine Arts between 1981 and 1991. He and Åke Pallarp designed the Stadion metro station.

== Early years ==
Hallek grew up in Rohuküla, Estonia, where his father worked as a fisherman. The family fled the Soviet occupation of Estonia on its fishing trawler in 1943 and arrived at Torsö on Listerlandet in Blekinge, Sweden.

The family settled on Torsö and continued their fishing business there. During the 1940s, Hallek took courses in drawing via correspondence, and after winning a drawing competition at school he received the opportunity to travel to Paris. Hallek moved to Stockholm in 1950 and began attending Signe Barth's school of the arts. He attended the Royal Swedish Academy of Fine Arts from 1953 to 1958.

== Artistry ==
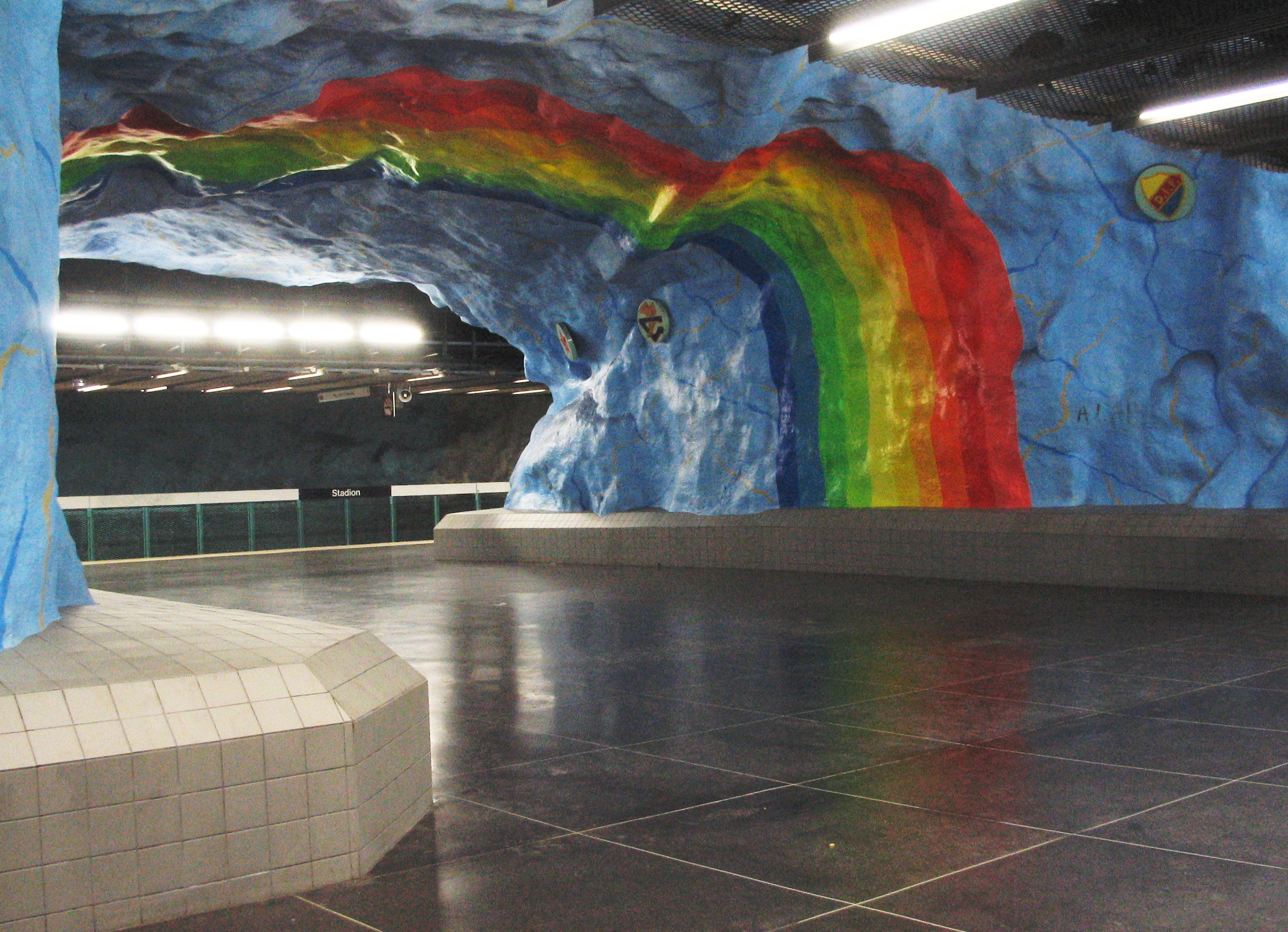
Stadium subway station

Hallek had his first solo exhibition in 1963, and his work has been regularly exhibited since. He has claimed to be inspired by the rainbows and sunsets he experienced while, as a child, frequently living on his family's fishing trawler.

During the 1970s and 1980s, he worked on hybrids between sculptures and paintings. In 1989, Hallek returned to Estonia for the first time since becoming a refugee, and has since held several exhibitions in his birth country.

From 1990, he worked on a series of paintings called Bärbara solnedgångar (Portable Sunsets). The paintings consist of two half-circles that have been sawed out of plywood, tied with strings, and had a handle attached to them. In late 2008, a series of these works were exhibited at the Moderna Museet in Stockholm.

== Death ==
Hallek died on 31 December 2025 in Stockholm, at the age of 94.
