= Gamla stan metro station =

Stockholm Metro station

Gamla stan
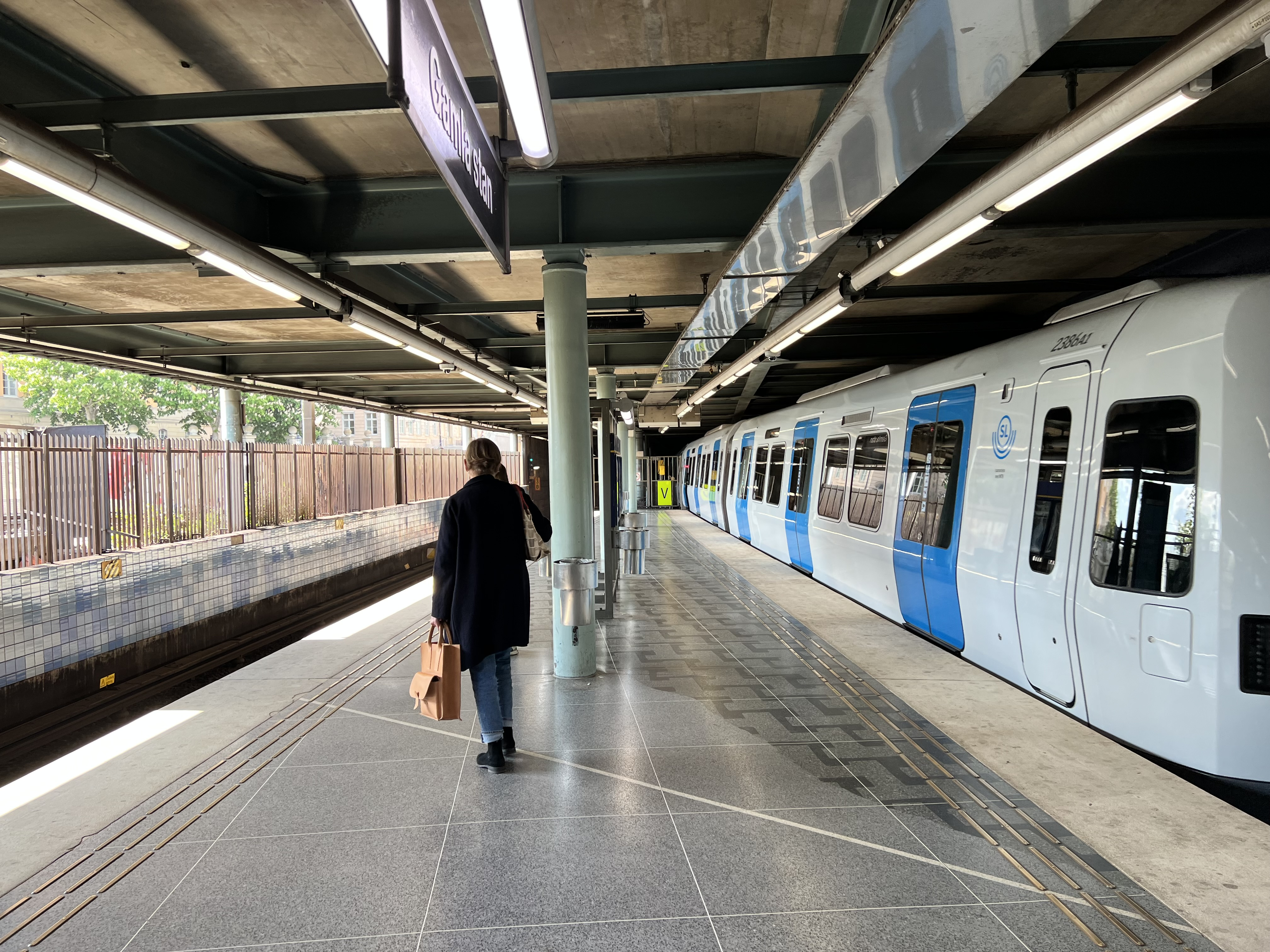
- Northbound platform, 2025

General information
- Location: Gamla Stan, Stockholm
- Coordinates: 59°19′22″N 18°4′3″E
- Elevation: 2.6 m (8.5 ft) above sea level
- System: Stockholm Metro station
- Owner: Storstockholms Lokaltrafik
- Platforms: 2 island platforms
- Tracks: 4

Construction
- Structure type: At grade
- Accessible: Yes

Other information
- Station code: GAS

History
- Opened: 24 November 1957; 68 years ago

Passengers
- 2019: 26,300 boarding per weekday (metro total)
- 2019: 10,650 (Green Line)
- 2019: 15,650 (Red Line)

Services
Preceding station	Stockholm Metro	Following station
Slussen towards Norsborg	Line 13	T-Centralen towards Ropsten
Slussen towards Fruängen	Line 14	T-Centralen towards Mörby centrum
T-Centralen towards Åkeshov	Line 17	Slussen towards Skarpnäck
T-Centralen towards Alvik	Line 18	Slussen towards Farsta strand
T-Centralen towards Hässelby strand	Line 19	Slussen towards Hagsätra
Location
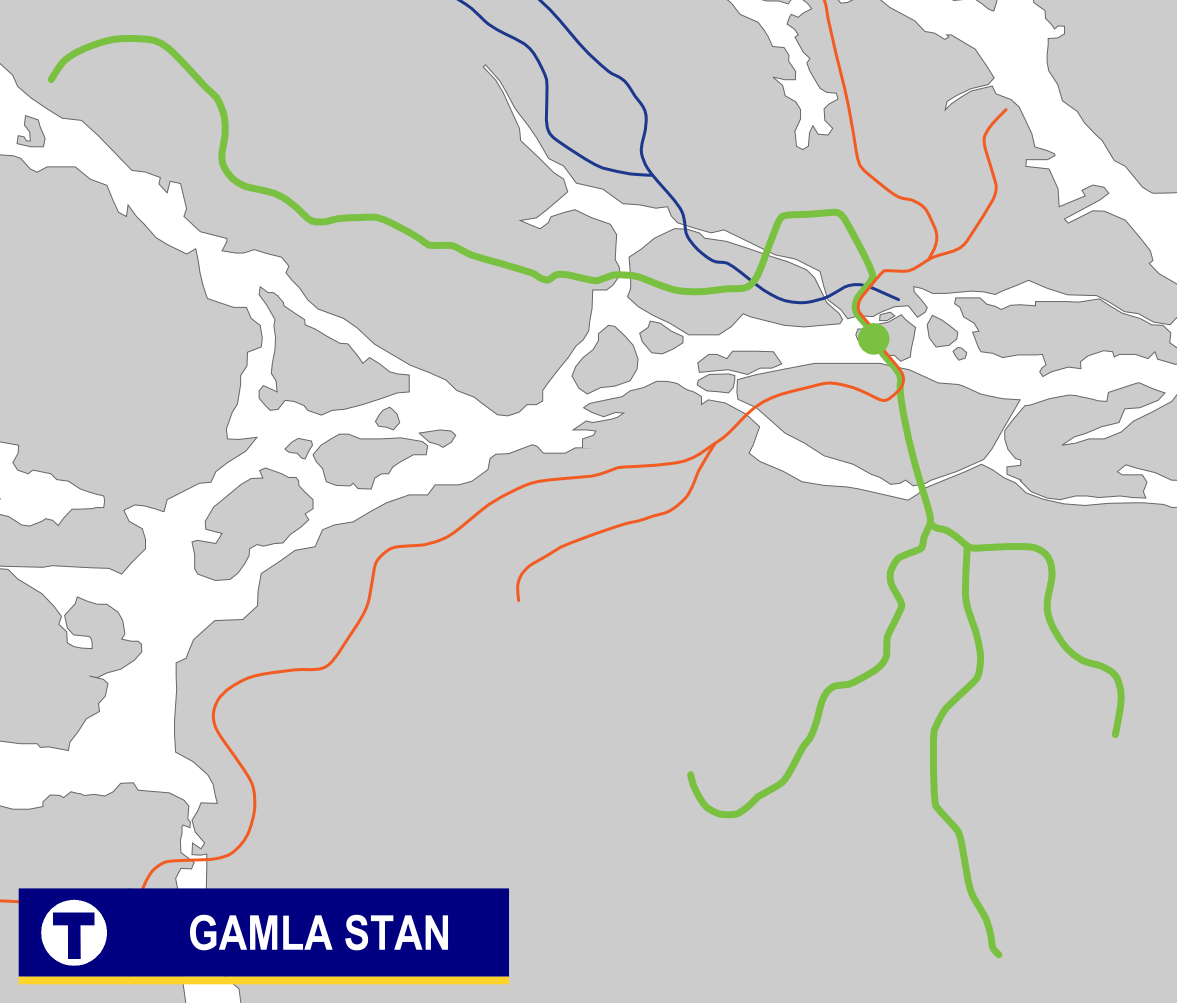
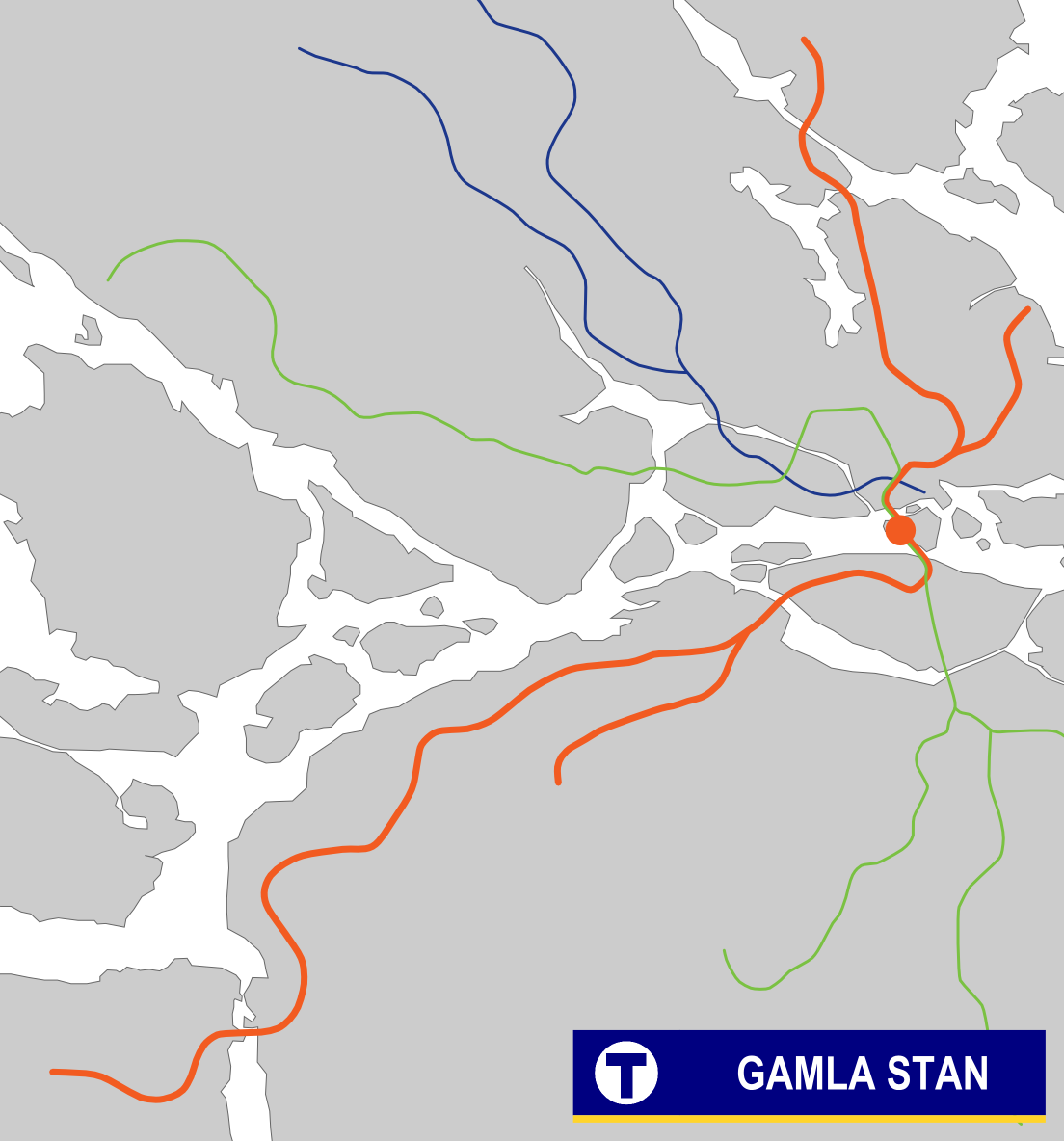
- Green Line highlighted Red Line highlighted

Gamla stan is a station on the Green and Red lines of the Stockholm Metro. It is located on the western side of Gamla Stan, Stockholm's Old Town.

The station is at ground level, although partly under the Centralbron bridge that carries road and mainline rail across the waterways that define the centre of the city. The same waterways are responsible for the ground level location of the station, unusual for a city centre metro station, as the lines cross between the islands of Stadsholmen and Södermalm by a bridge immediately south of the station.

The station has two island platforms between four parallel through tracks, with the western platform for trains to the north and the eastern one for trains to the south. Red Line trains use the inner pair of tracks and Green Line the outer tracks. The platforms are accessed from a ticket hall located under the tracks and platforms. The ticket hall can be reached from Mälartorget, Munkbroleden or Munkbrohamnen.

The station site was previously occupied by the Köttorgshallen and Munkbrohallen markets, which were demolished to make way for the Metro. The station was opened on 24 November 1957 as part of the Green Line connection between Slussen and Hötorget which connected the previously disconnected southern and western sections of that line. On 5 April 1964, the first stretch of the Red Line, between T-Centralen and Fruängen, was opened.

As part of the Art in the Stockholm Metro project, in 1998, the station received medieval weaving patterns, weather sun motifs and cement mosaic-patterned floors by Göran Dahl, as well as fencing with weaving patterns between the tracks by Britta Carlström.

== Gallery ==
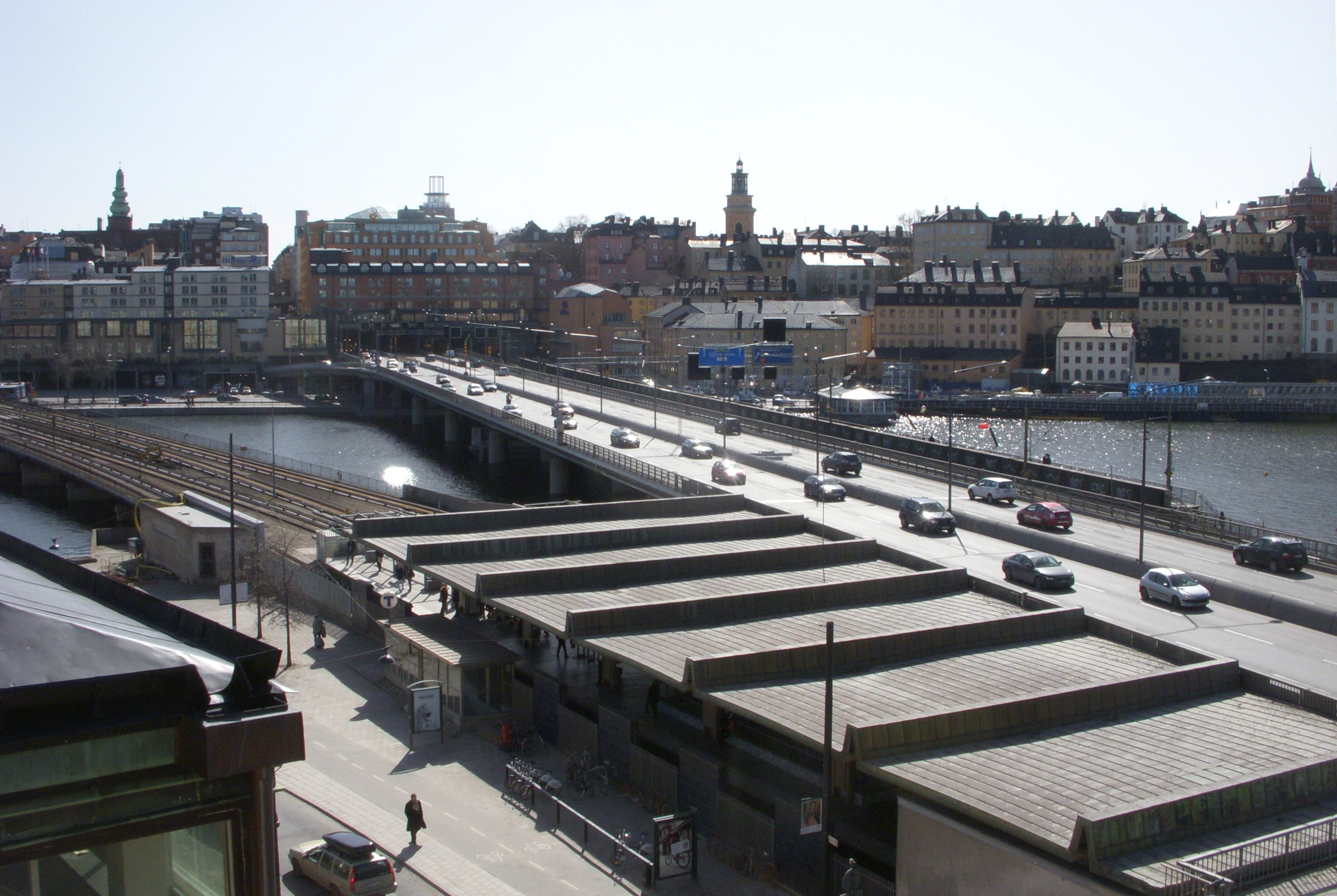
Metro station and Centralbron, 2011

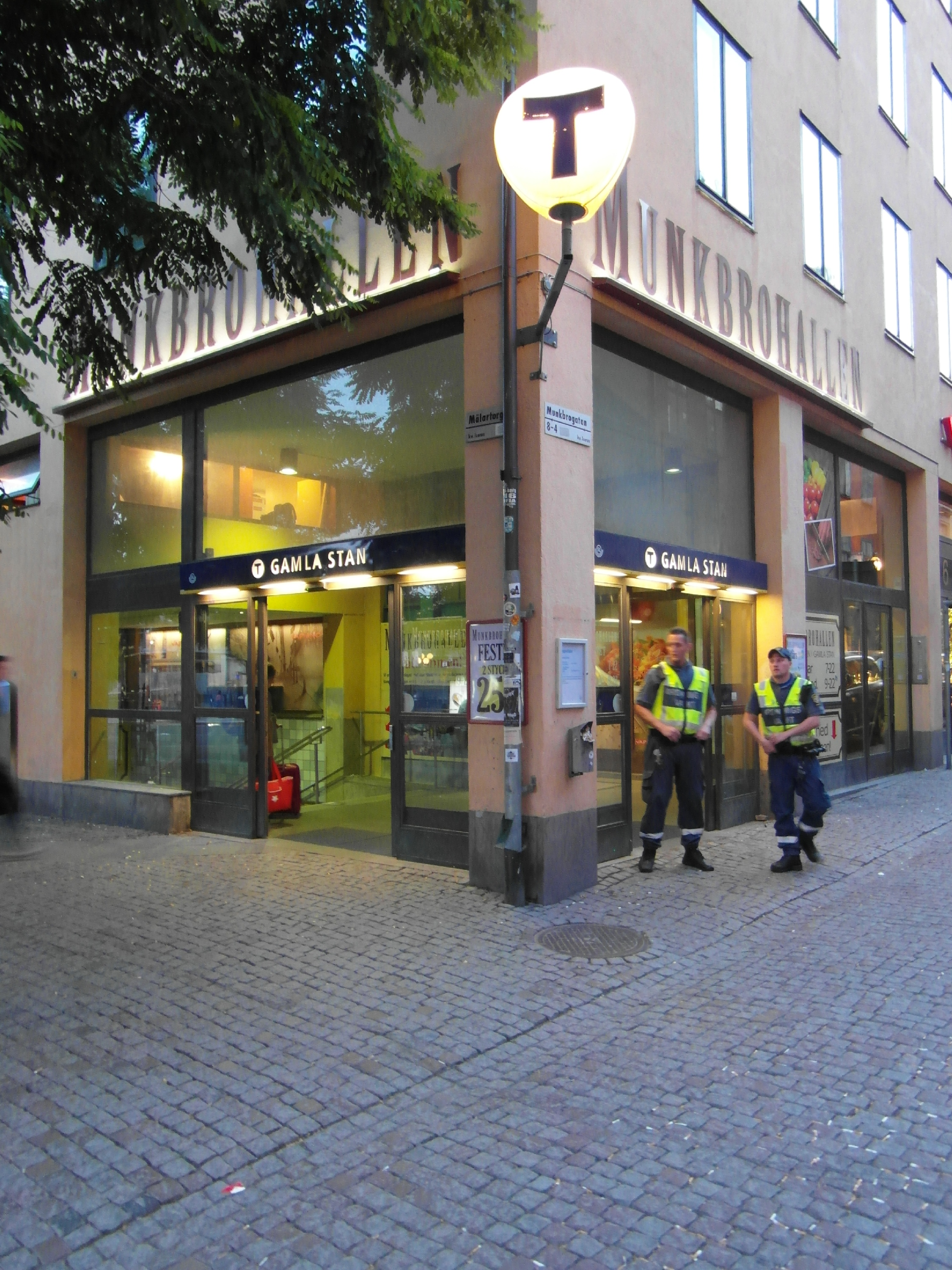
Entrance, 2013

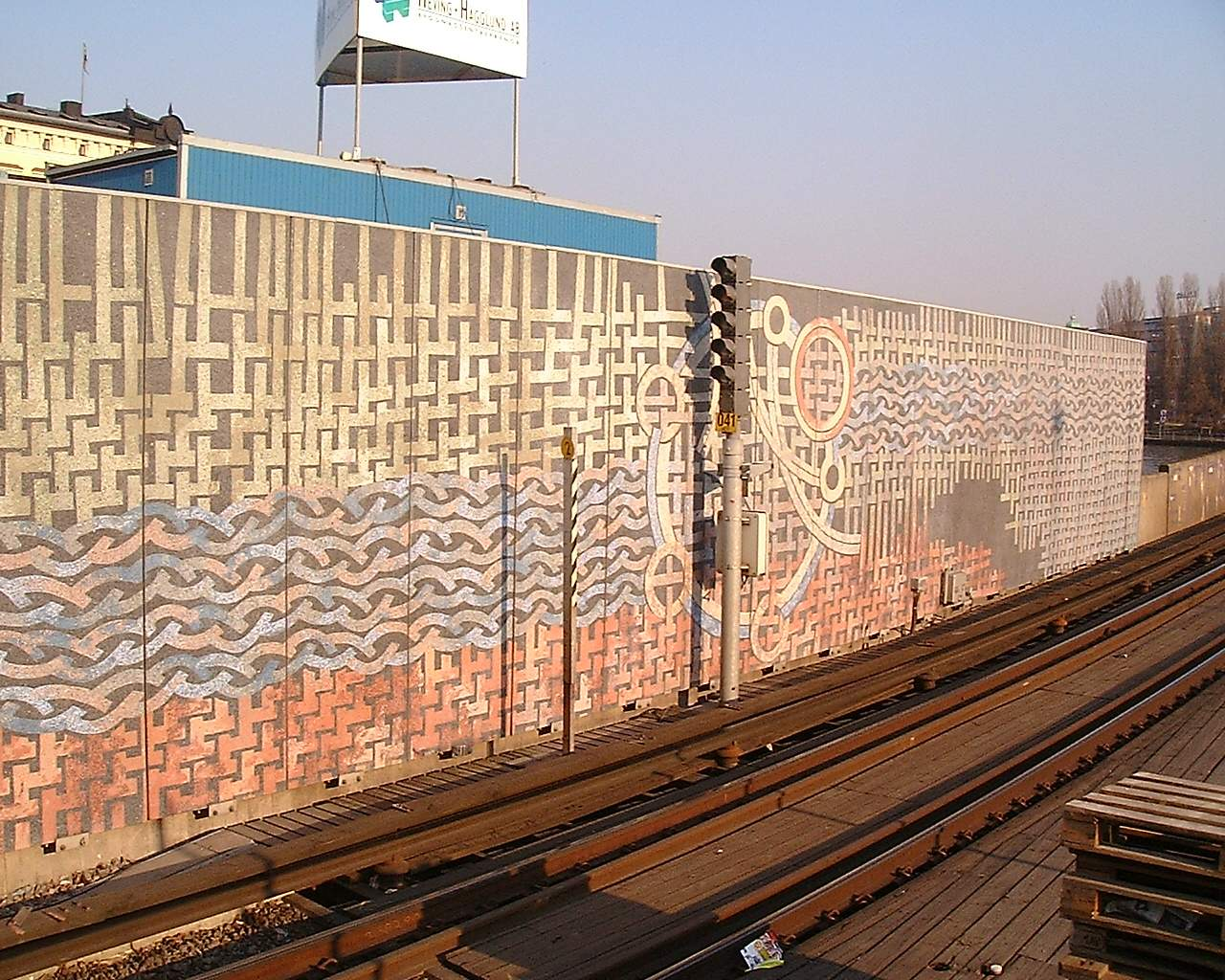
Artwork, 2007
