= Tekniska högskolan metro station =

Stockholm Metro station

Tekniska högskolan
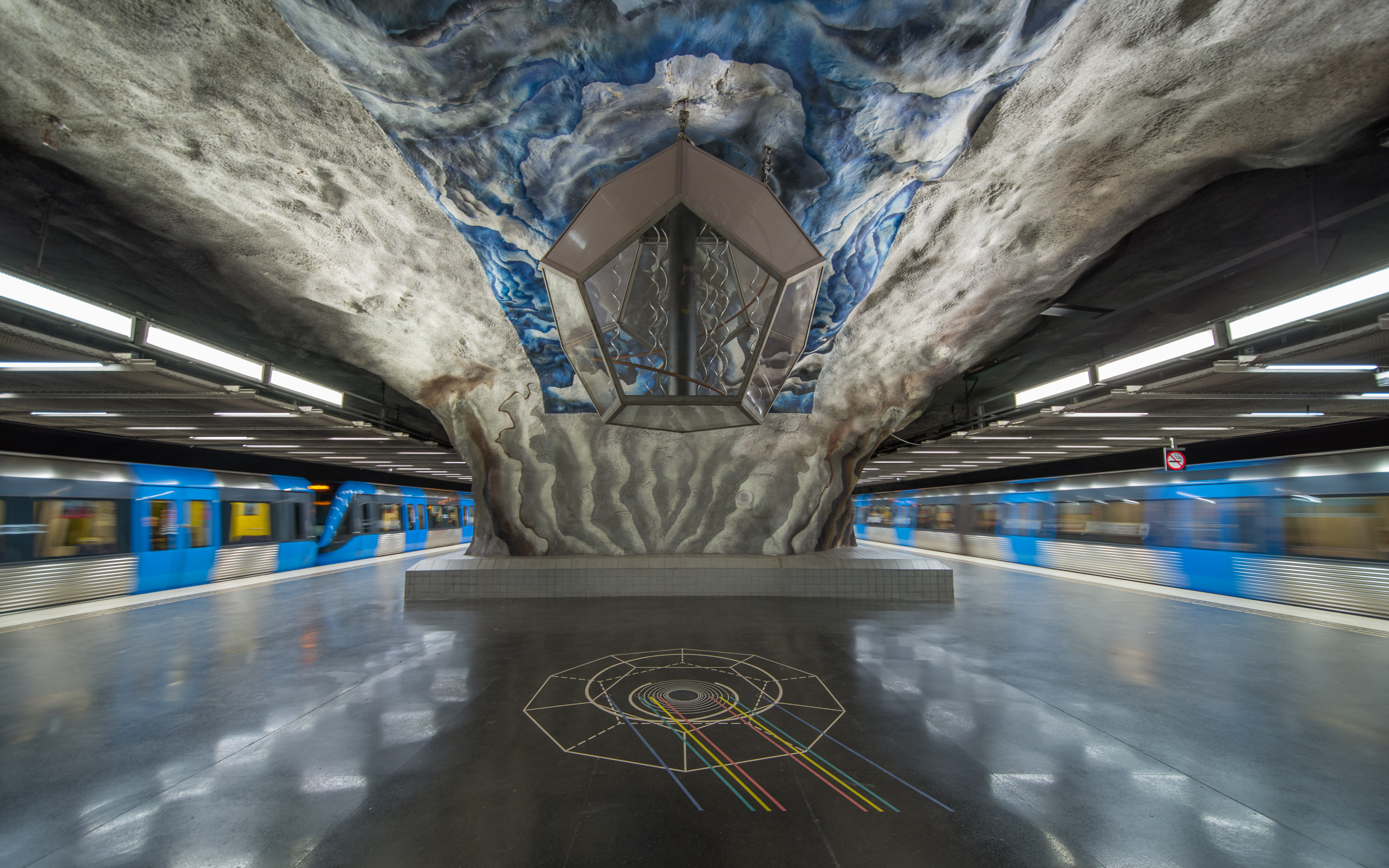
- Note the dodecahedron hanging from the roof

General information
- Coordinates: 59°20′45″N 18°04′17″E
- Elevation: 4.5 m (15 ft) above sea level
- System: Stockholm Metro station
- Owner: Storstockholms Lokaltrafik
- Platforms: 1 island platform
- Tracks: 2

Construction
- Structure type: Underground
- Depth: 18 m (59 ft)
- Accessible: Yes

Other information
- Station code: TEH

History
- Opened: 30 September 1973; 53 years ago

Passengers
- 2019: 25,750 boarding per weekday

Services
Preceding station	Stockholm Metro	Following station
Stadion towards Fruängen	Line 14	Universitetet towards Mörby centrum
Location
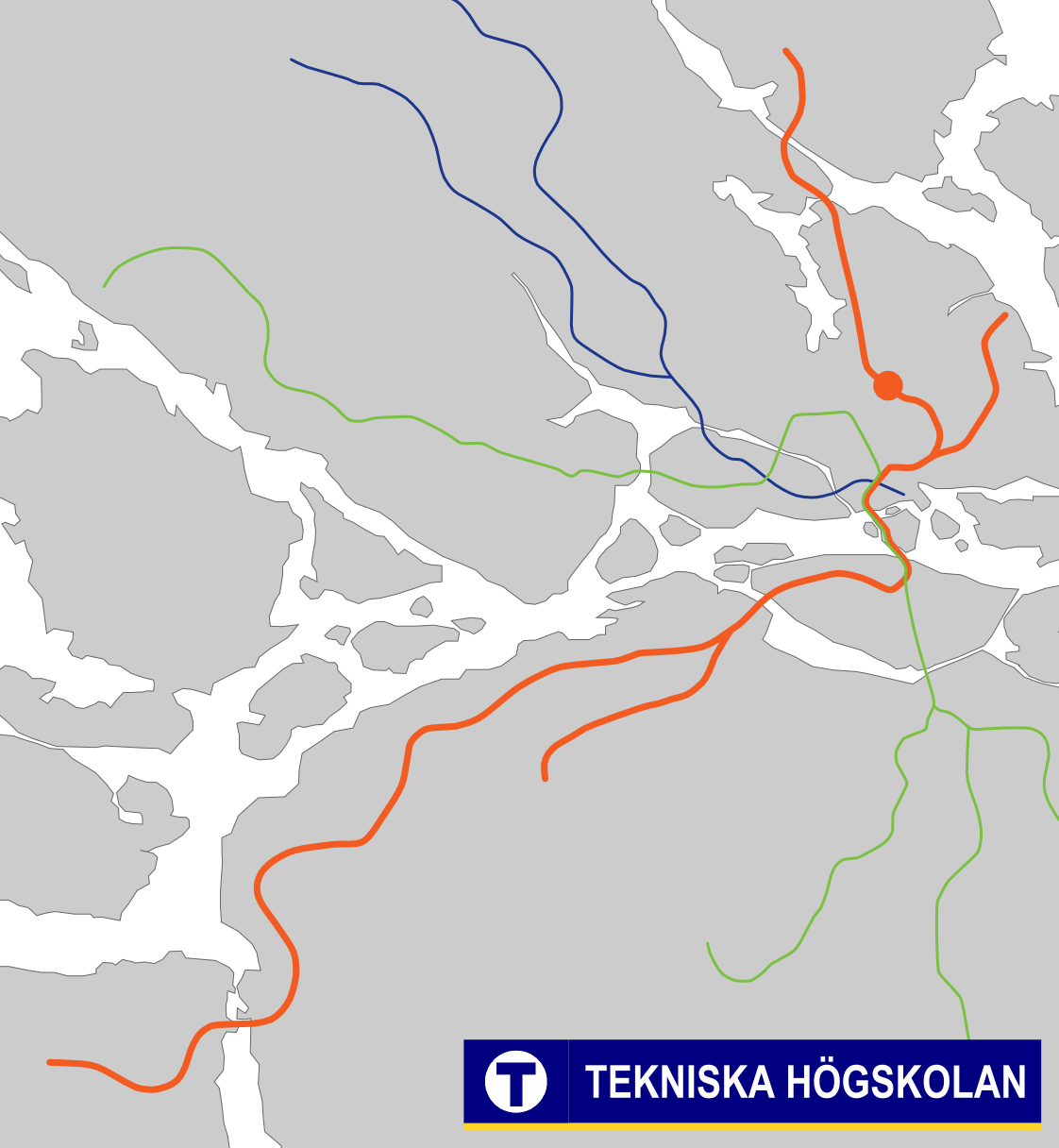

Tekniska högskolan is a station on Line 14 of the Red Line of the Stockholm Metro, located in the districts Östermalm and Norra Djurgården, near the Royal Institute of Technology. The station was opened on 30 September 1973 as the northern terminus of the extension from Östermalmstorg. On 12 January 1975, the line was extended further north to Universitetet. Tekniska högskolan metro station is connected to Stockholms östra railway station, a station on the Roslagsbanan railway, and a terminal for buses towards Norrtälje and Vaxholm.

The art in the station was done by Lennart Mörk and features a common theme of technology, the four elements, and the laws of nature. Quotes from the history of science are interspersed with paintworks and sculptures such as Newton's apple, the wings of Icarus, and the five Platonic solids representing the classical elements — a dodecahedron, symbolising the aether and containing the "black hole of the universe", is suspended from the central ceiling. As one of the first "cave stations" where the walls follow the contours of the underlying bedrock, Tekniska högskolan (along with nearby Stadion) metro station was awarded the 1973 Kasper Salin Prize.
