= SL C30 =

Stockholm Metro train type

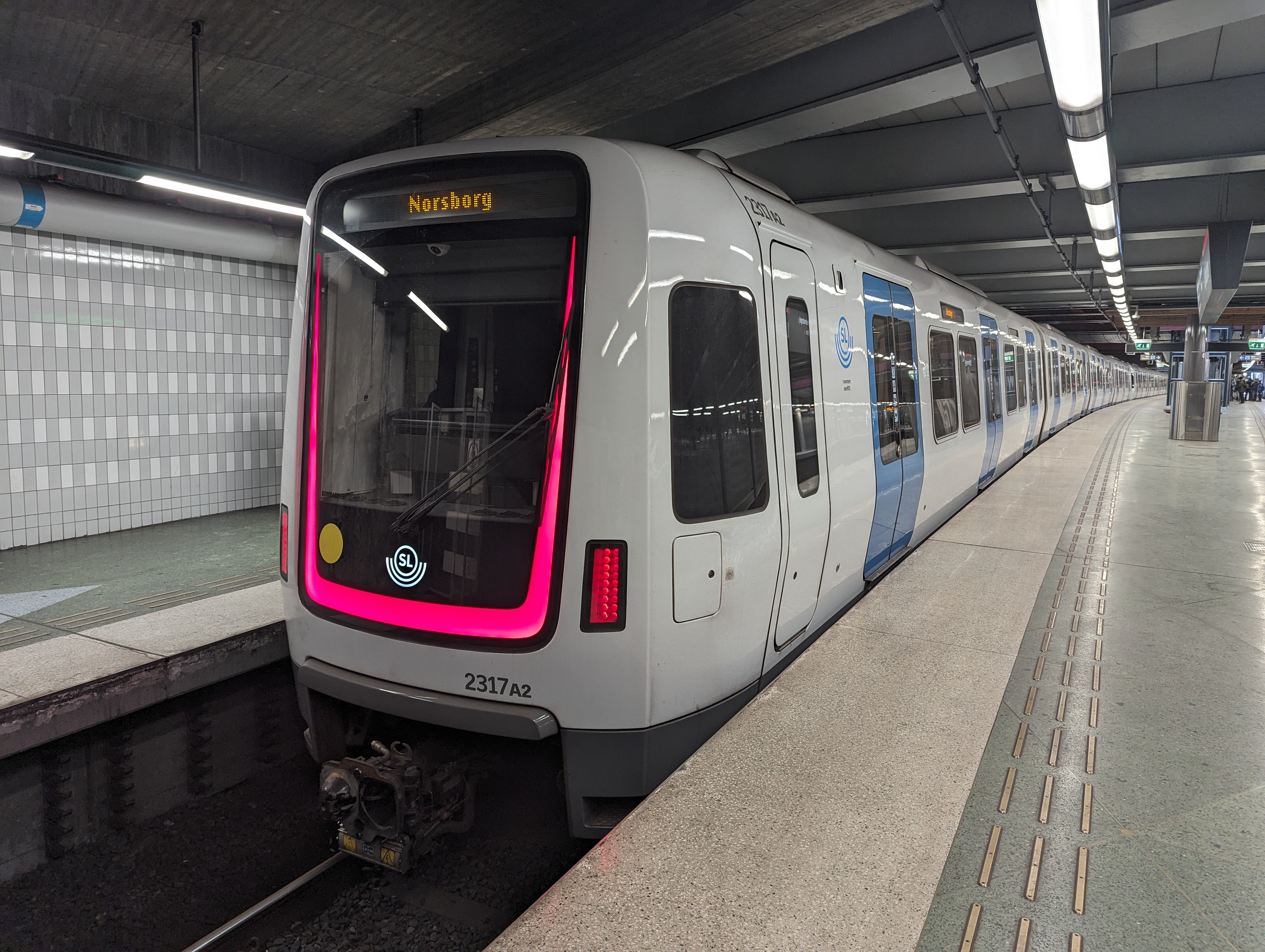
- An arriving C30 train at Liljeholmen metro station

- Interior of a C30 carriage
- In service: 2020–present
- Manufacturer: Bombardier Transportation/Alstom
- Assembly: Hennigsdorf, Germany
- Family name: Movia
- Replaced: All remaining SL Cx trains
- Constructed: 2018-2024
- Entered service: 11 August 2020
- Number under construction: Total delivery of 464 carriages (116 sets)
- Formation: 4 cars (A1–B1–B2–A2) per unit, 2 units per train
- Fleet numbers: 2301–2416
- Capacity: 634 per unit at 5 standees/m^{2}
- Operator: Connecting Stockholm (under contract from Storstockholms Lokaltrafik)
- Depots: Norsborg and Nyboda depots
- Line served: Red Line on the Stockholm Metro

Specifications
- Car body construction: Welded aluminium extrusions
- Train length: 70 m (229 ft 7 29/32 in) per unit
- Width: 2,915 mm (9 ft 6 49/64 in)
- Height: 3,915 mm (12 ft 10 9/64 in)
- Floor height: 1,155 mm (3 ft 9 15/32 in)
- Doors: 3 per side
- Wheel diameter: 825 mm (2 ft 8 31/64 in)
- Wheelbase: 11 m (36 ft 1 5/64 in) between boogie centers
- Maximum speed: 90 km/h (56 mph) (design); 80 km/h (50 mph) (service)
- Weight: 116 t (114 long tons; 128 short tons)
- Traction system: Bombardier/Alstom MITRAC TC1500 SiC–VVVF
- Traction motors: 12 × MJB 260-2 150 kW (200 hp) asynchronous 3-phase AC
- Power output: 1.8 MW (2,400 hp)
- Acceleration: 1.1 m/s^{2} (3.6 ft/s^{2})
- Deceleration: 1.1 m/s^{2} (3.6 ft/s^{2})
- Electric systems: 650–750 V DC third rail
- Current collection: Contact shoe
- UIC classification: 2′Bo′+Bo′Bo′+Bo′Bo′+Bo′2′
- Bogies: Bombardier FLEXX Eco
- Safety systems: ATC/ATO and CBTC (not in use)
- Coupling system: Dellner Type 330
- Seating: 140 per unit
- Track gauge: 1,435 mm (4 ft 8 1/2 in) standard gauge

The SL C30 is a type of metro train used on the Stockholm Metro in Stockholm County, Sweden.

The first C30 set was inaugurated in 2020 on the Red Line, and they have subsequently replaced all the older rolling stock dating back to the 1970s and 1980s. 116 sets have been delivered to Stockholm by Bombardier Transportation and subsequently by Alstom. A set consists of four carriages which are attached by gangways.

The train is based on the Movia platform, which is the same as its predecessor, the C20. The C30 has air conditioning and more wheelchair space, compared to the C20.

== Technical details ==
The C30 trains are based on the Alstom Movia platform, which also underpins the older C20 trains. The Movia design was originally developed by Adtranz before the company's acquisition by Bombardier Transportation.

Each C30 unit measures 70.0 metres in length, and two units are normally coupled to form a 140-metre train, corresponding to the maximum platform length on the Stockholm Metro. In comparison, the C20 stock consists of 46.5-metre-long units, while earlier "Cx" series trains were approximately 17 metres long. Each C30 unit is composed of four car bodies, designated A1, B1, B2, and A2, and accommodates approximately 140 seats.

The C30's bogie arrangement follows a conventional design, with two bogies under each car body, unlike the C20, which uses four bogies per unit. The cars are interconnected with full-width, open gangways covered by flexible bellows. The car bodies are constructed from aluminium rather than steel, and the underframe and bogies are enclosed to reduce noise, drag, and ice build-up during winter conditions.

Although the C30 offers fewer seats per metre than the C20, it provides improved comfort, including full air conditioning, reduced noise levels, wider doorways, and a smoother ride, supported by newly developed Flexx bogies. A C30 unit weighs approximately 116 tonnes, corresponding to 1.66 tonnes per metre, which is about 15% heavier than a C20 unit.

Manufacturing was divided between Bombardier Sifang (Qingdao) Transportation Ltd. (BST) in China and Bombardier’s plant in Hennigsdorf near Berlin, Germany. Climatic testing was conducted at Rail Tec Arsenal’s facilities in Vienna, Austria.

The initial procurement included 96 trains for a cost of 5.1 billion SEK (at 2013 prices), later expanded to 116 trains, with a price per 140-metre train of approximately 106 million SEK.

The C30 features LED headlights and an exterior with smooth, painted aluminium panels, replacing the bare corrugated sheet metal used on C20 rolling stock.

== Service ==
C30 trains were first introduced into passenger service on the Red Line. Once the full fleet is delivered, surplus units will be deployed on the Blue Line. C20 trains replaced by C30 units on the Red Line have been reassigned to the Green and Blue lines.

== Interior ==
The C30 is equipped with speech-synthesised passenger announcements, using the Elin voice developed by Acapela Group, replacing the earlier pre-recorded Linda voice. The interior includes air conditioning throughout, expanded areas for pushchairs and wheelchairs, and an emphasis on standing room, meaning slightly reduced seating capacity compared to previous stock.

C30 interior

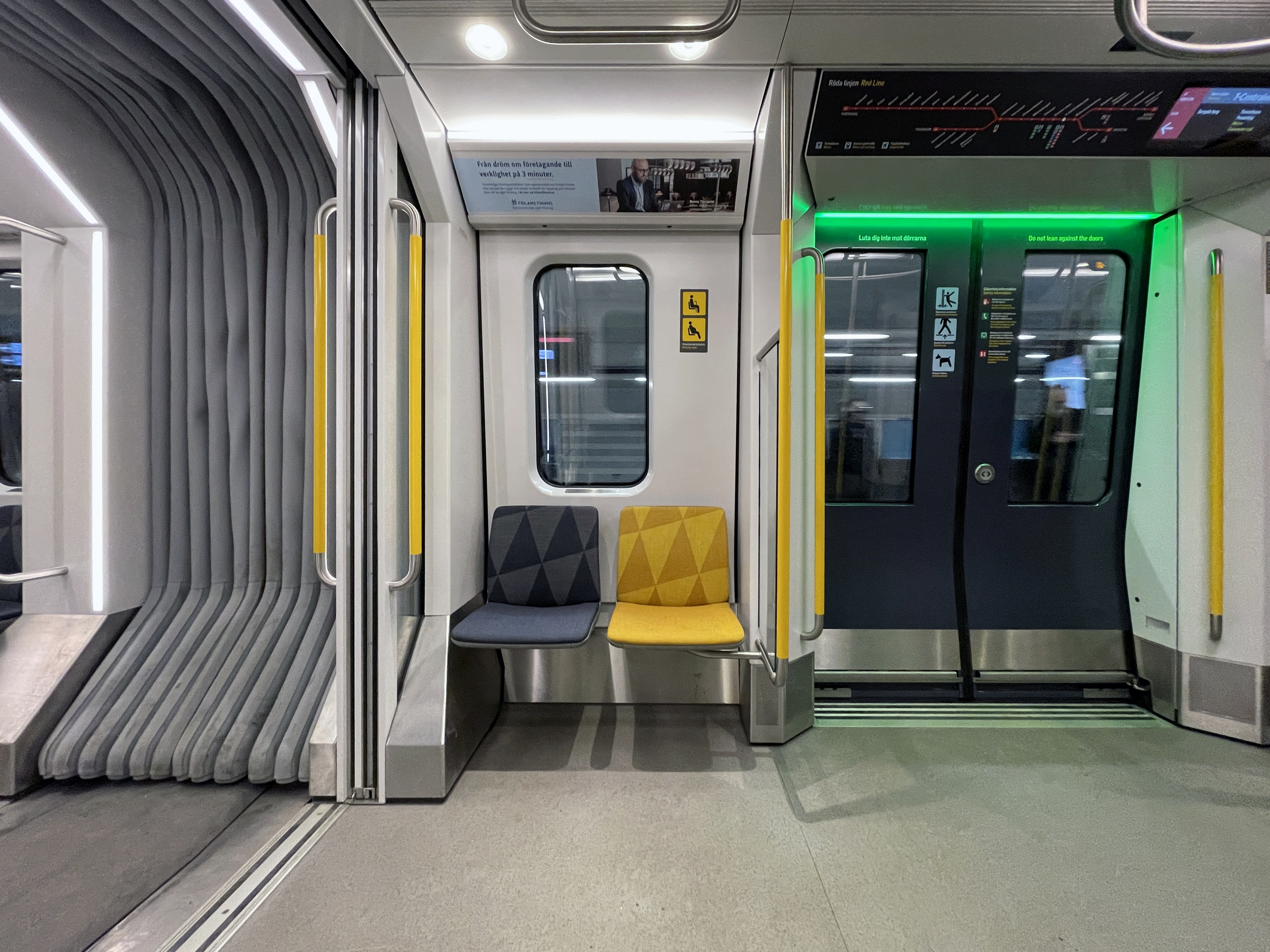

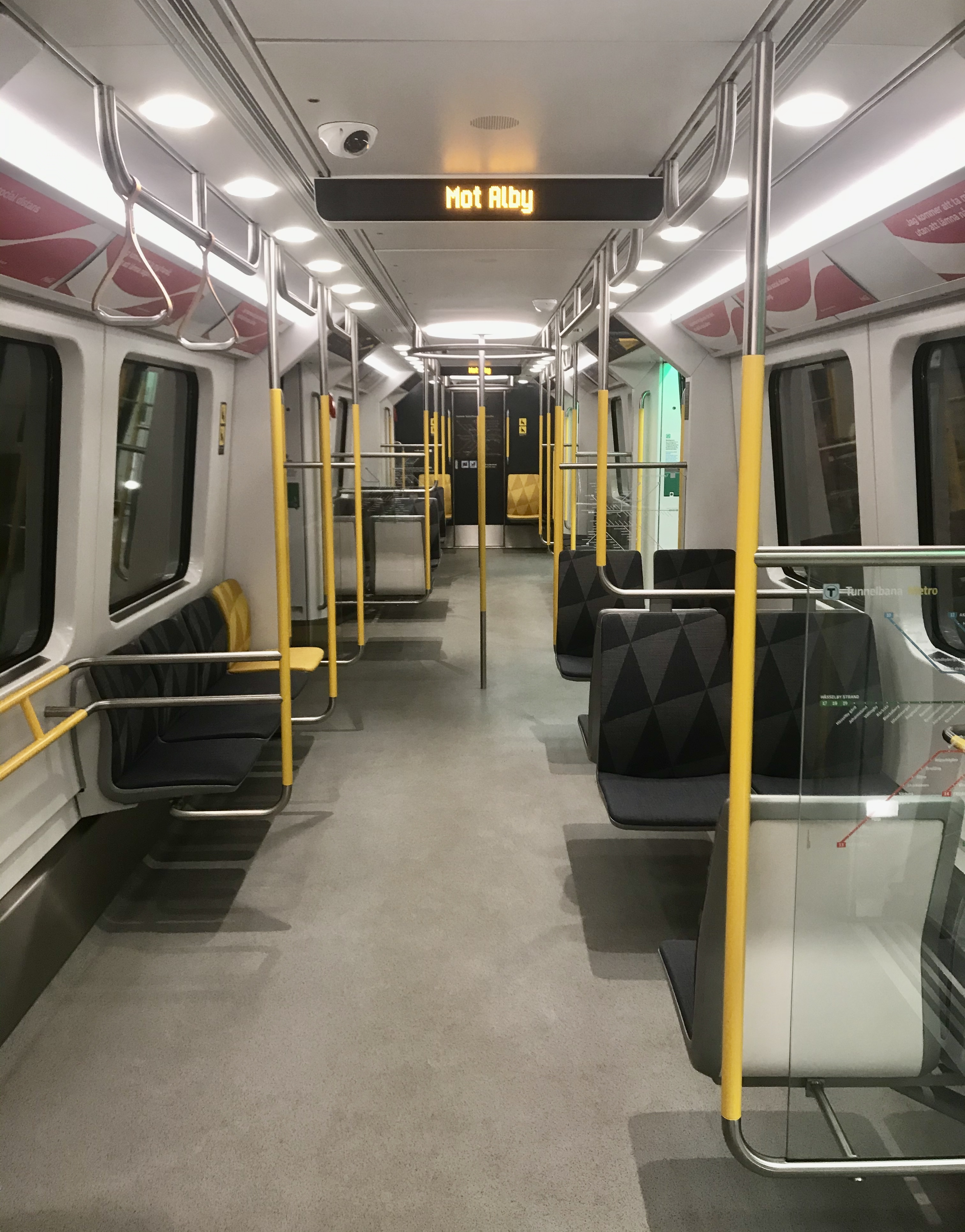

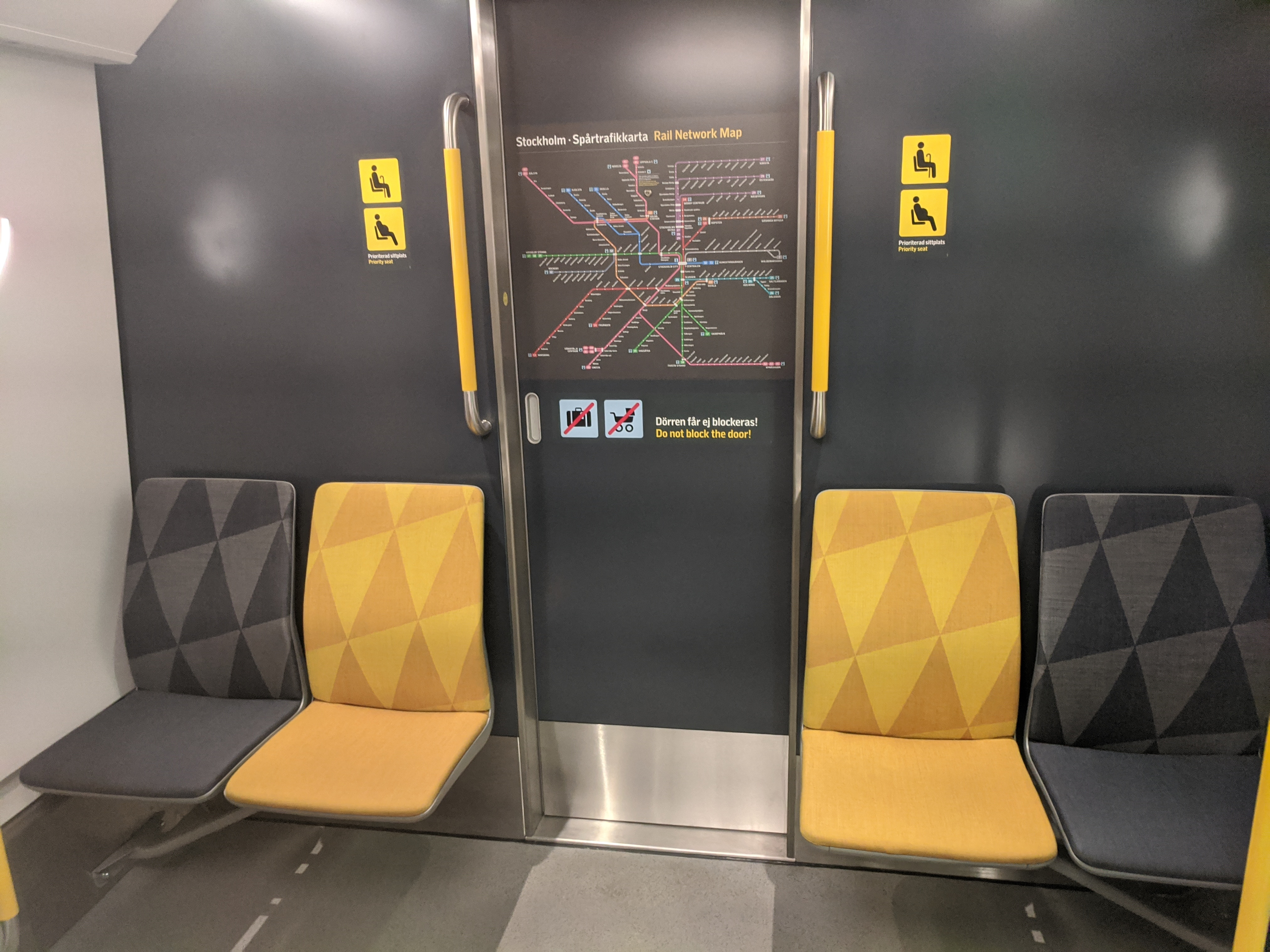

The seat upholstery, woven from wool, features a pattern inspired by the paving of Sergels torg. Most seats are dark-grey, while yellow seats are reserved for passengers with special needs. Some fabric patterns incorporate subtle images, such as a girl with a balloon or couples holding hands.

C30 Chair Fabric

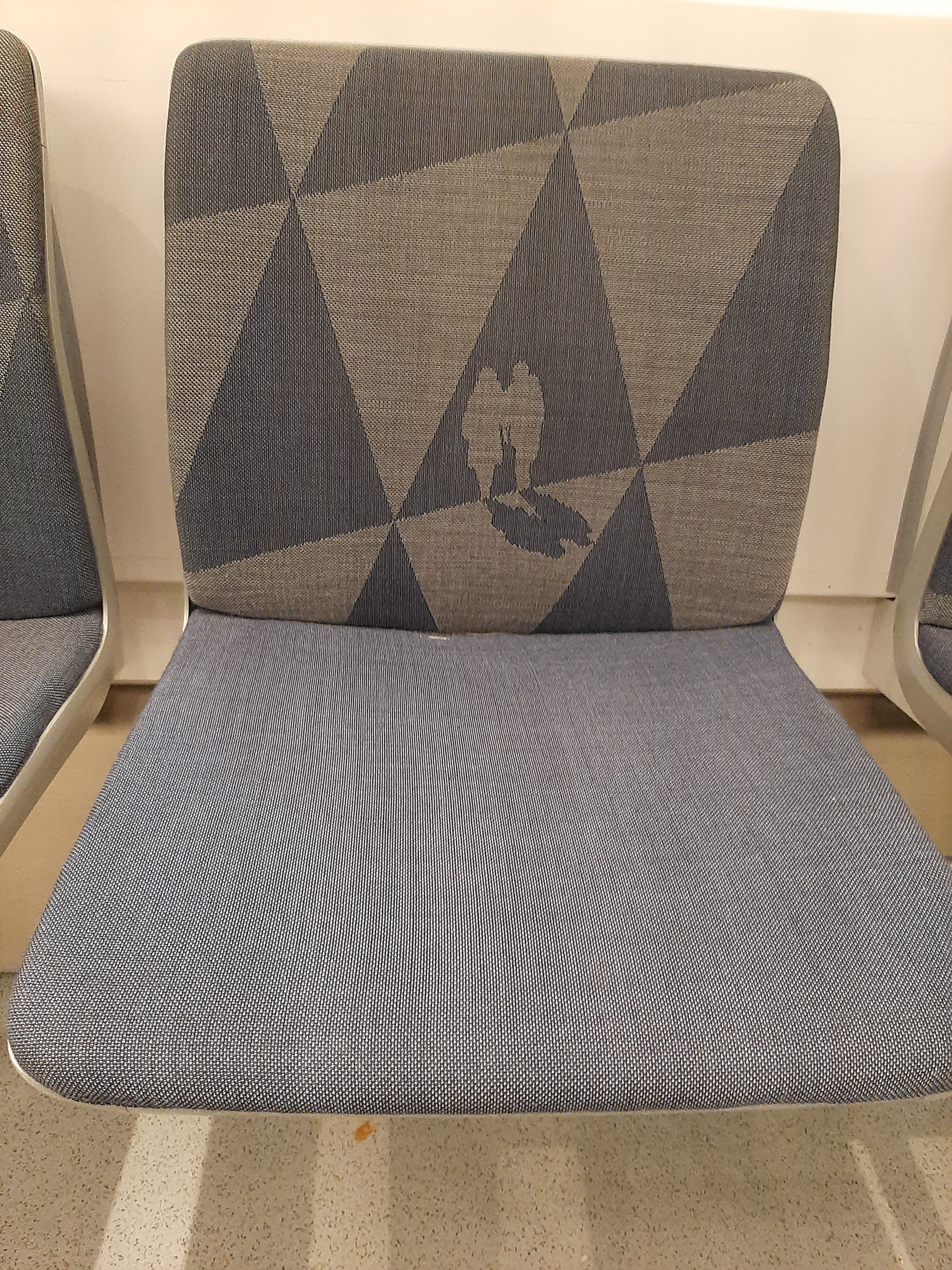

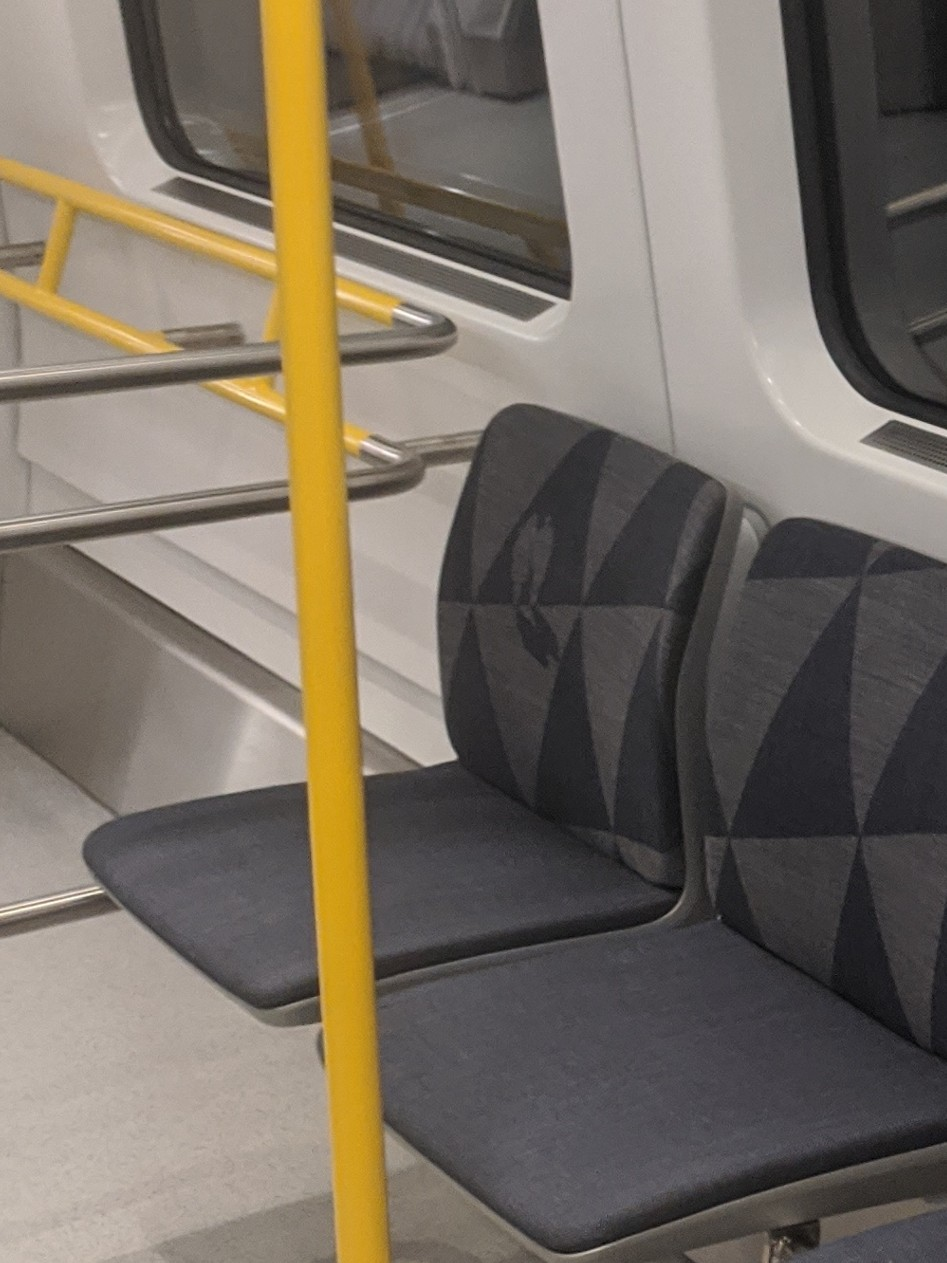

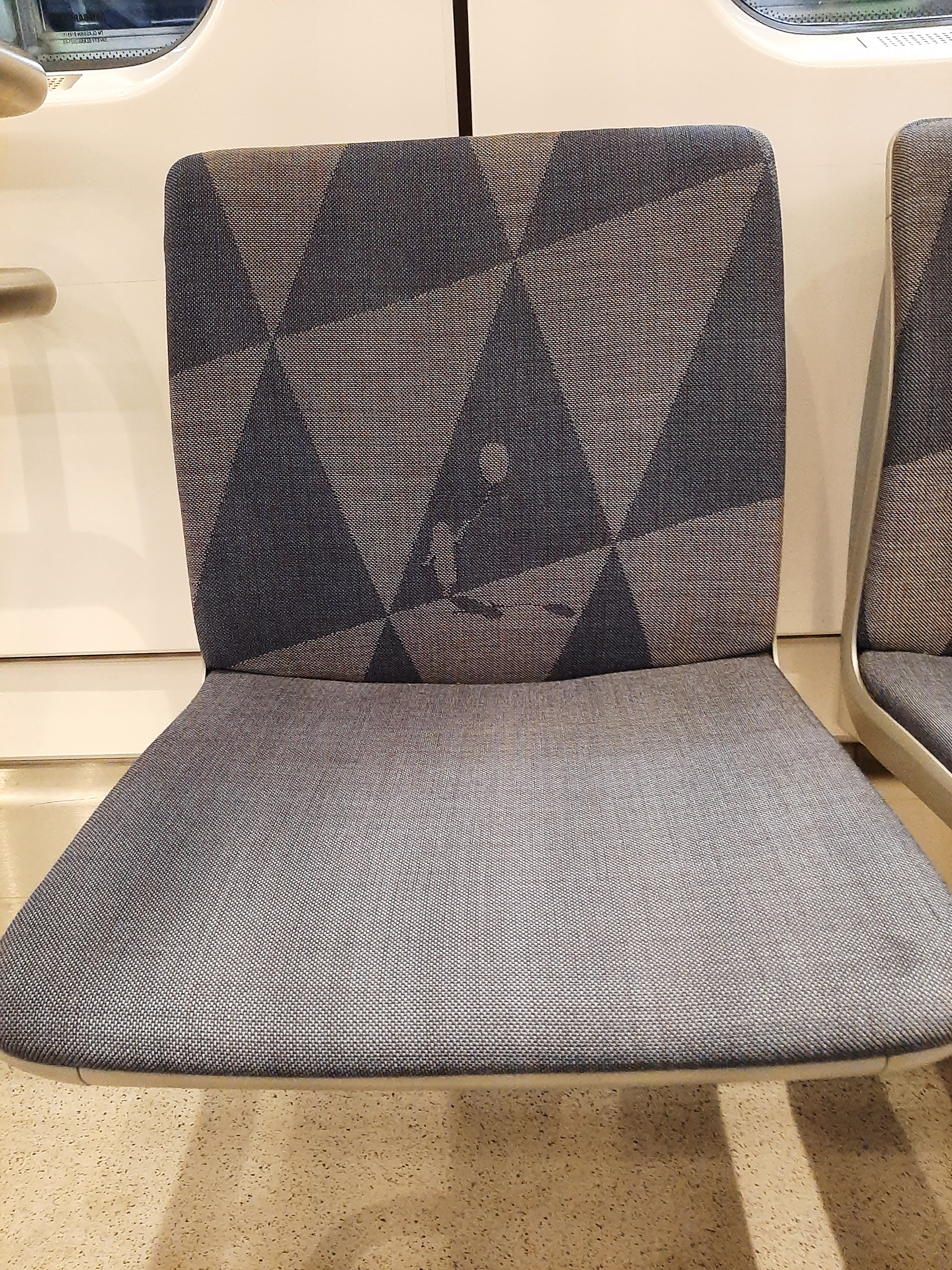

Certain ventilation grilles beneath the windows are perforated with decorative motifs as easter eggs, including the Swedish Three Crowns symbol, Pac-Man figures, media control icons, and heart shapes.

C30 ventilation grille patterns

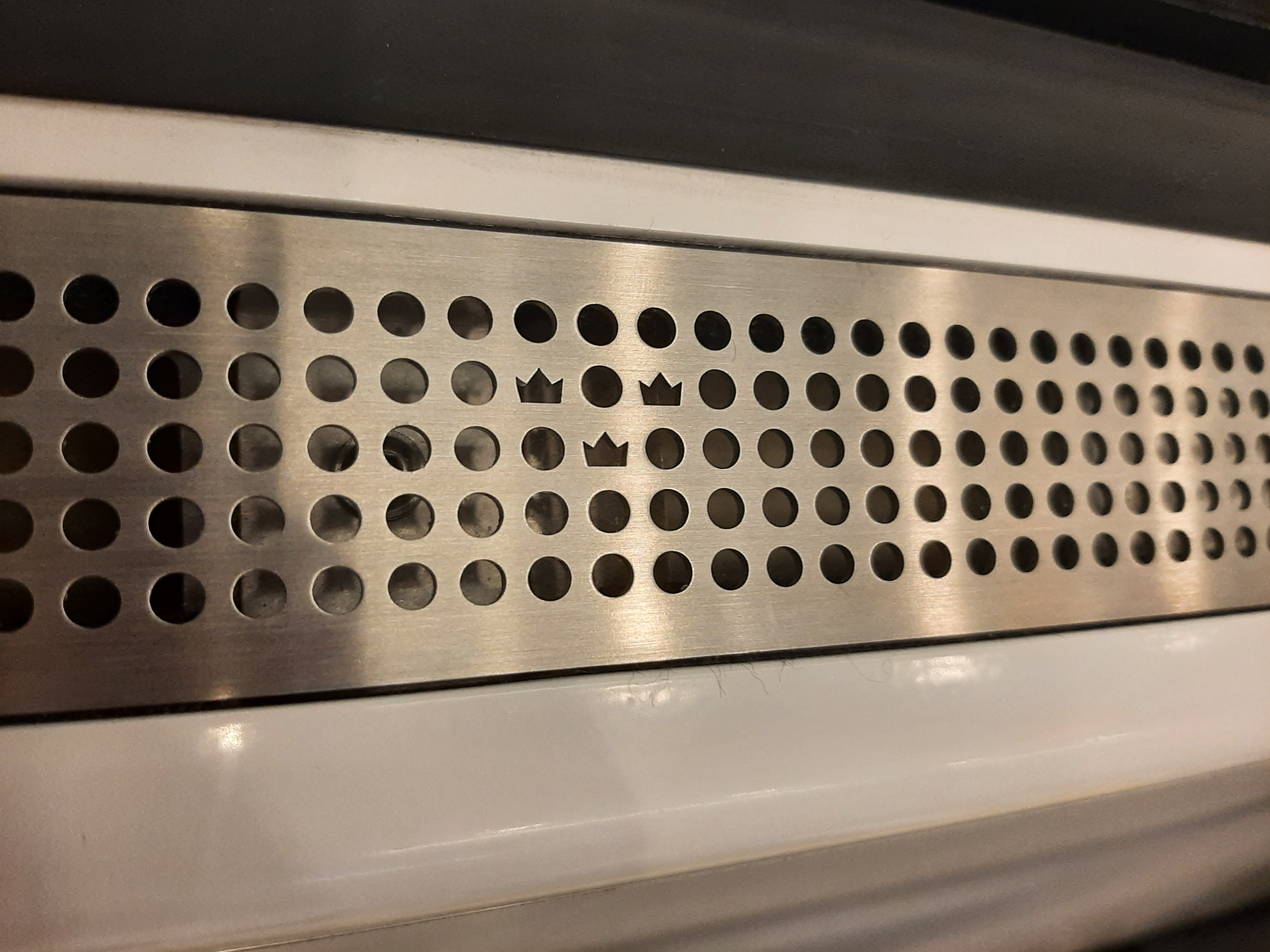

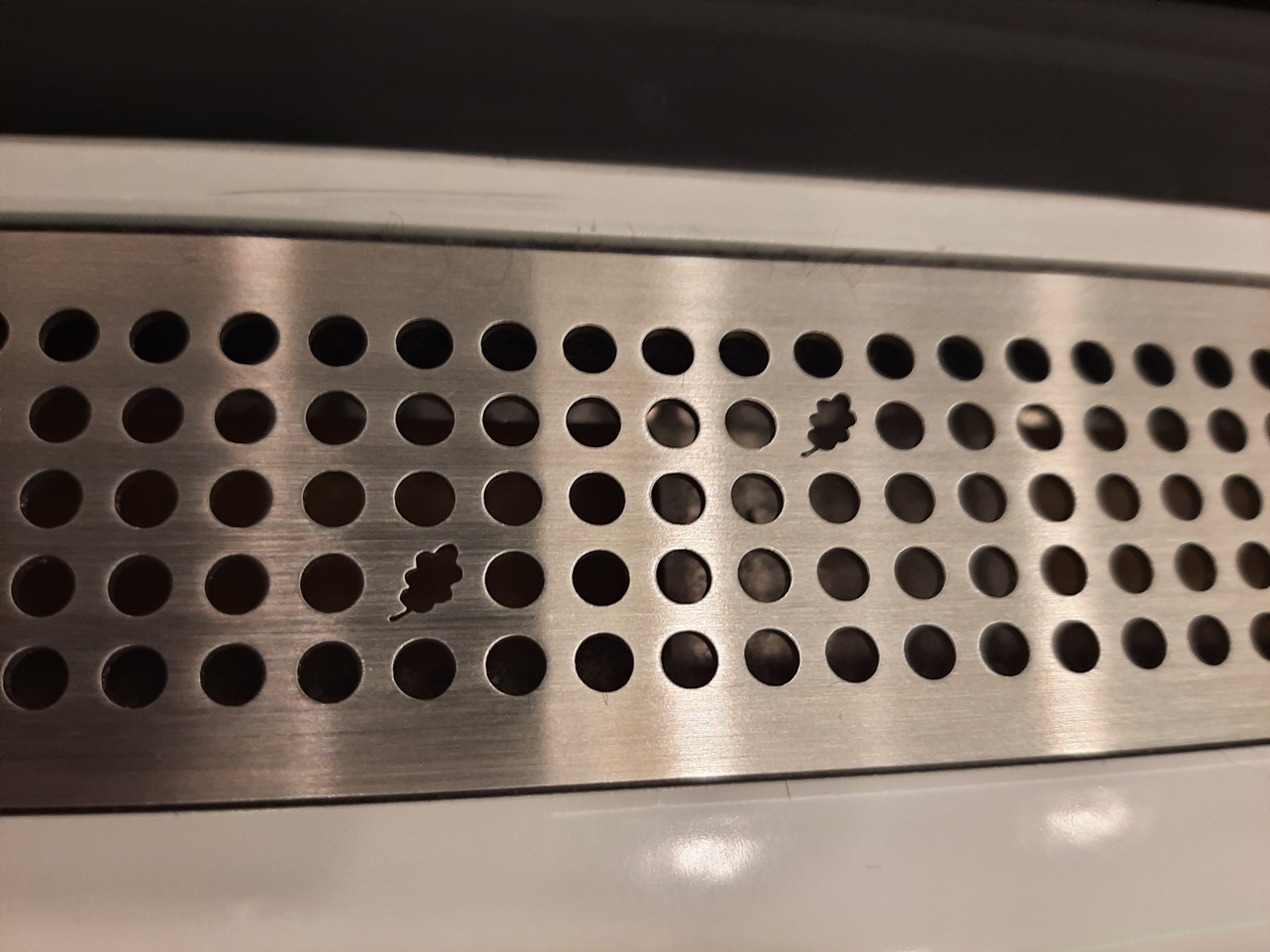

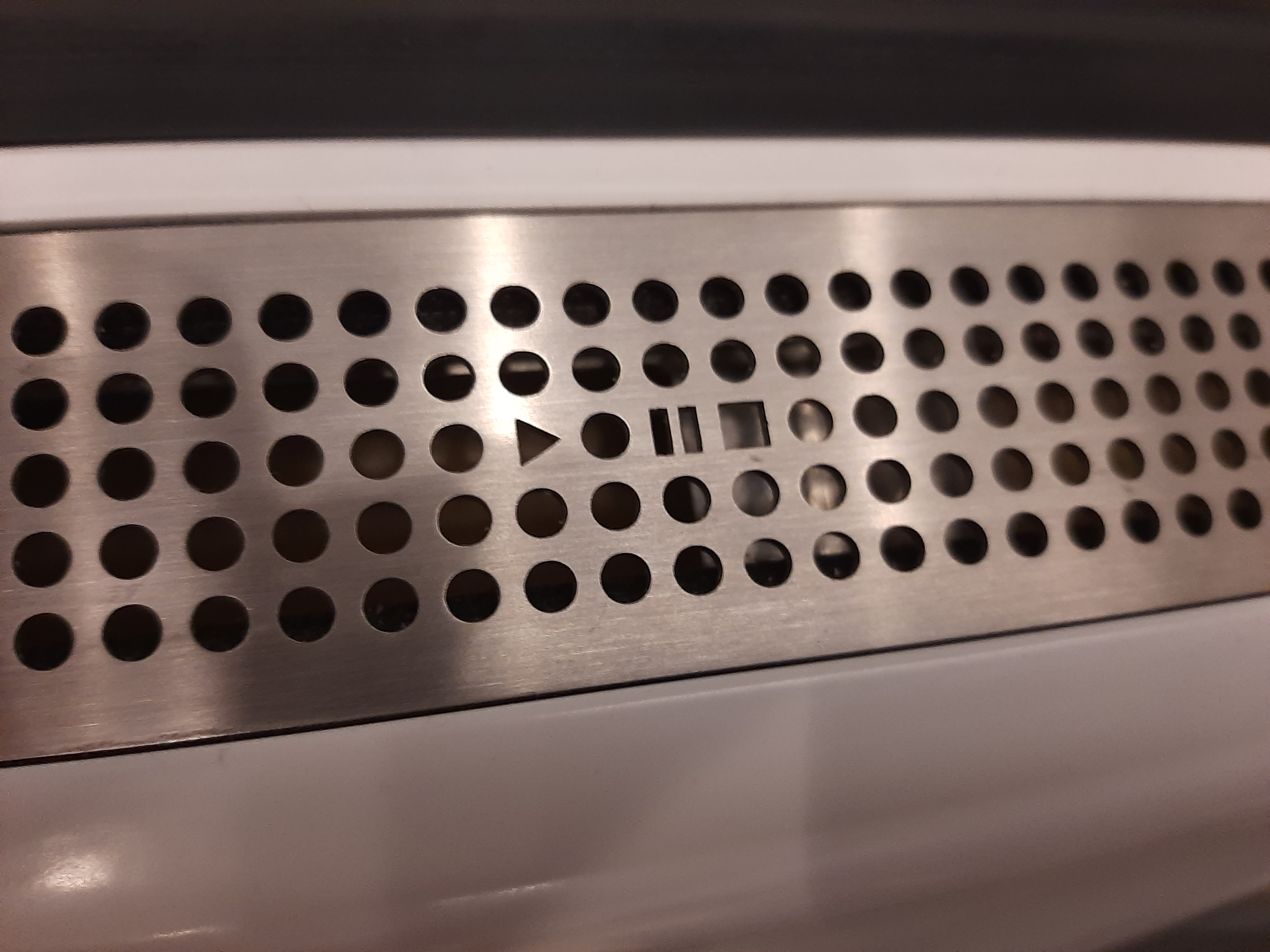

To match the new C30 stock, the older C20 trains underwent a mid-life refurbishment between 2019 and 2023, which introduced longitudinal seating on one side of each carriage, removal of seats to provide wheelchair and pushchair spaces, replacement of upholstery including marked priority seats, and the installation of information screens and additional CCTV cameras.
