= List of sulfur lamp installations =

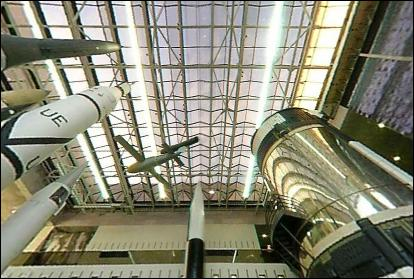
Air and Space Museum

Gallery Place

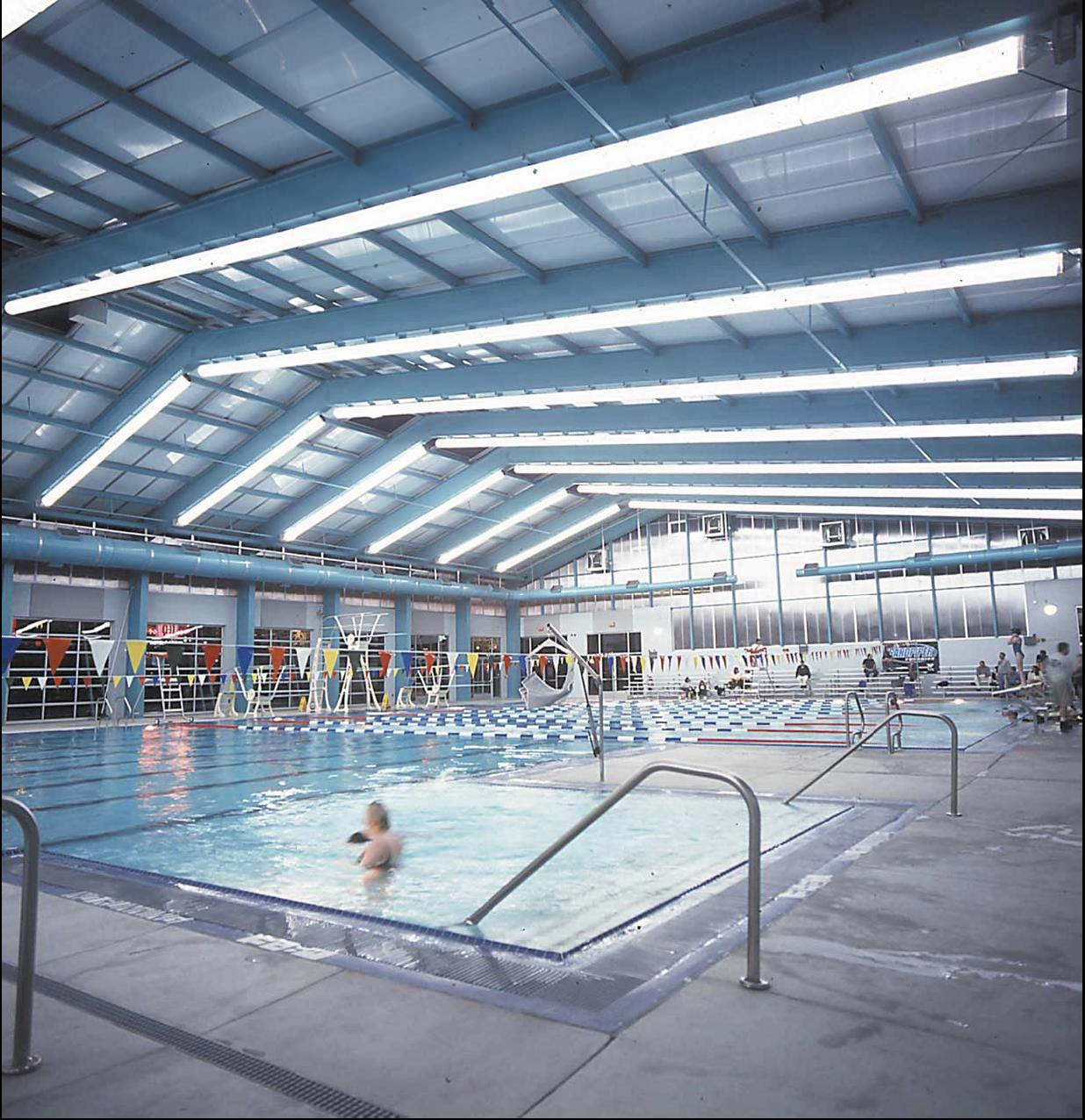
Las Vegas Mun. Pool

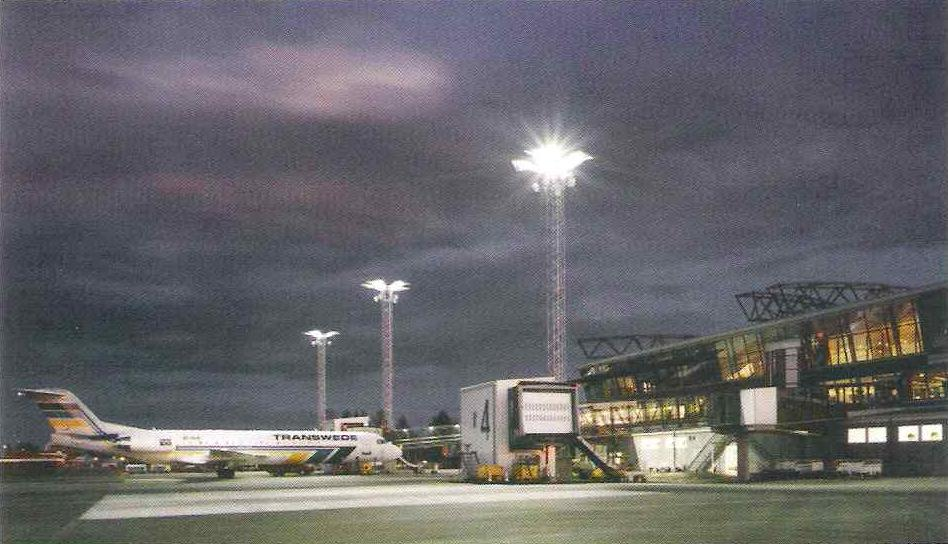
Midlanda Airport

Many of the installations of sulfur lamps were for testing purposes only, but there remain a few sites where the lamps are in use as the primary lighting source. Perhaps the most visible of these would be the glass atriums in the National Air and Space Museum.

== North America ==
- Washington, D.C.
  - National Air and Space Museum
  - U.S. Department of Energy James V. Forrestal Building, Independence Avenue, SW — report #1 report #2
  - Gallery Place Metro Station (removed)
- British Columbia
  - BC Hydro headquarters, Burnaby
- California
  - Sacramento Municipal Utility District headquarters, Sacramento — report
- Florida
  - Epcot
  - United States Postal Service Distribution Facility, Fort Lauderdale
- Illinois
  - Shedd Aquarium Caribbean Reef, Chicago — report
  - Brookfield Zoo, Brookfield
- Michigan
  - Chrysler Truck Assembly Plant, Warren
- Nevada
  - Municipal Pool, Las Vegas
- Ohio
  - State of Ohio's General Services Building, Columbus — report
  - Ohio State University Book Depository and Archives
- Oregon
  - USPS Processing and Distribution Center, Portland — report
- Utah
  - Hill Air Force Base — report

== Europe ==
- Austria
  - Ein Volumen aus Licht by Monika Gora, Vienna, a temporary art installation in 1995
- Denmark
  - DONG (formerly Nesa) headquarters, Gentofte — report
- Germany
  - Semperlux AG headquarters, Berlin, a combined heliostat and sulfur lamp system
  - TK Park, Westerholt — report
- Italy
  - 3M European Distribution Center, Carpiano — report
- Sweden
  - Lund University Hospital, Lund
  - Midsommarkransen station, Stockholm Metro, Stockholm — report
  - Sundsvall-Härnösand Airport (Midlanda), Sundsvall
  - Sundsvall Post Terminal, Sundsvall — report

== Asia ==
- China
  - Government Office Building, Ningbo
