= Aspudden metro station =

Stockholm Metro station

Aspudden
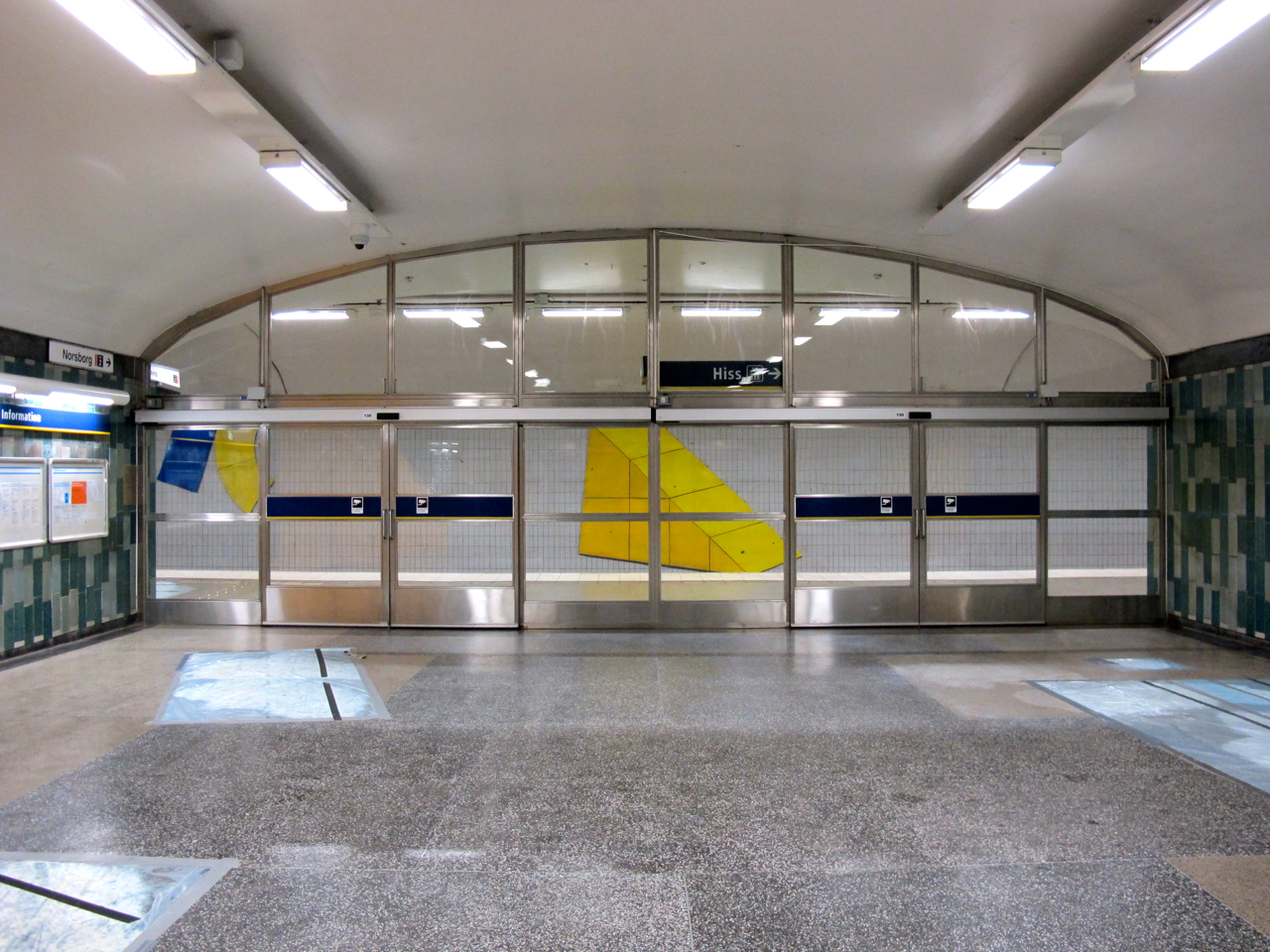
- Platform level cross tunnel

General information
- Coordinates: 59.30644°N 18.00114°E
- Elevation: 10.9 m (36 ft) above sea level
- System: Stockholm Metro station
- Owner: Storstockholms Lokaltrafik
- Platforms: 2 side platforms
- Tracks: 2

Construction
- Structure type: Underground
- Depth: 22 m (72 ft)
- Platform levels: 1
- Accessible: Yes

Other information
- Station code: ASU

History
- Opened: 5 April 1964; 62 years ago

Passengers
- 2019: 5,750 boarding per weekday

Services
Preceding station	Stockholm Metro	Following station
Örnsberg towards Norsborg	Line 13	Liljeholmen towards Ropsten
Location
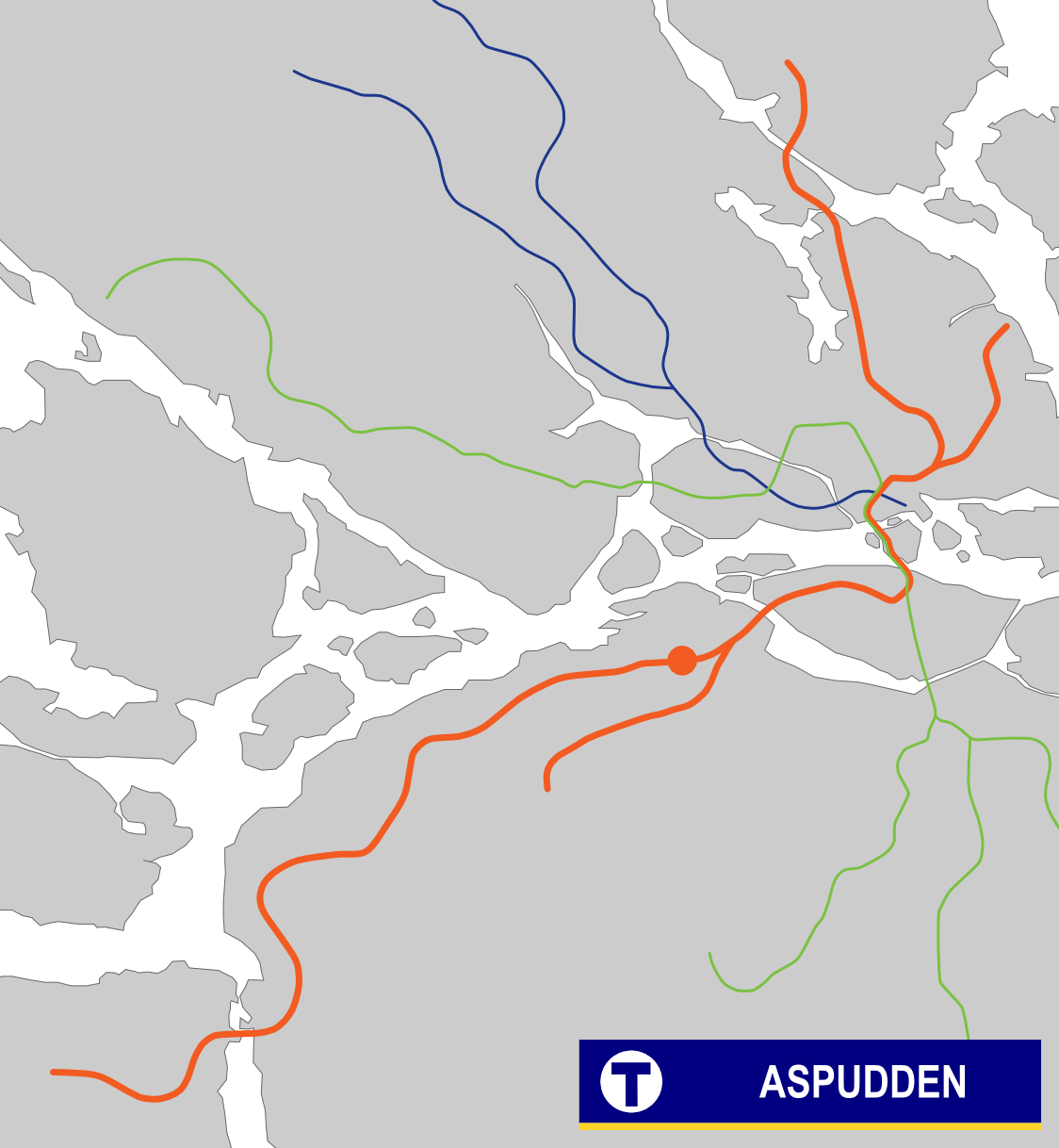

Aspudden is a station on Line 13 of the Red Line of the Stockholm Metro, located in Aspudden, Stockholm City, Sweden. The station was opened on 5 April 1964 as part of the first section of Metro 2, running between T-Centralen and Örnsberg.

The station is situated underground, with the running tracks between 15 m (49 ft) to 20 m (66 ft) below ground level. It has two tracks each in a separate tunnel and each served by its own side platform. The two platforms are situated between the tracks in a back-to-back configuration and connected together by a cross tunnel, thus functioning like a single island platform.

The station has a small street level entrance pavilion that gives access, via steps and a lift, to the single basement level ticket hall and barrier line. Access from to ticket hall to the platforms is by escalator, lift and stair.

To the east of Aspudden station, a tunnelled single track service connection allows trains to run between the station and Nyboda depot without needing to reverse at Liljeholmen station.

The station features artistic decoration added in 1987 by Pär Gunnar Thelander. This consists of a penguin sculpture, in the platform level cross tunnel, and enamelled reliefs, on the track walls.

== Gallery ==
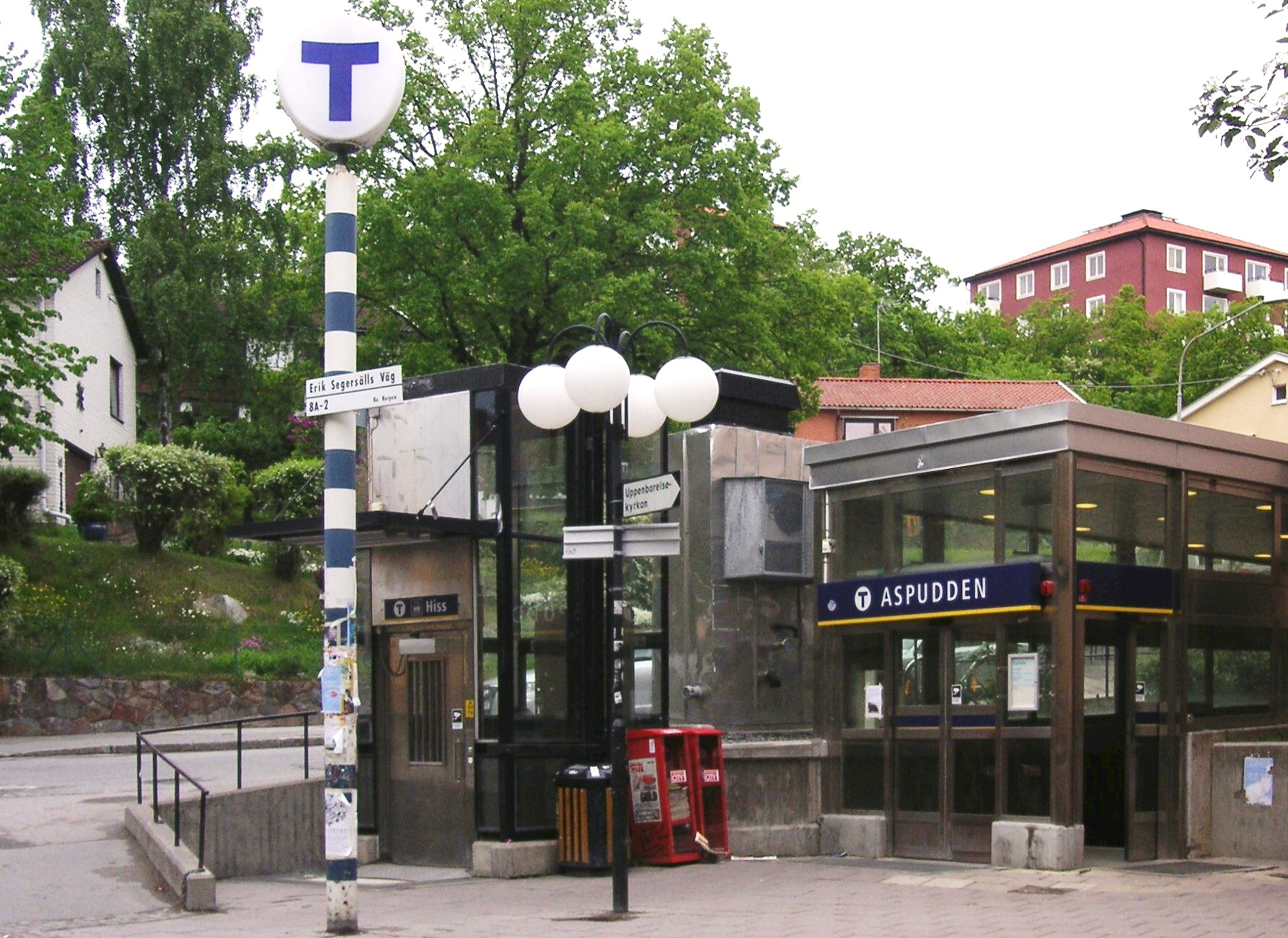
Station entrance

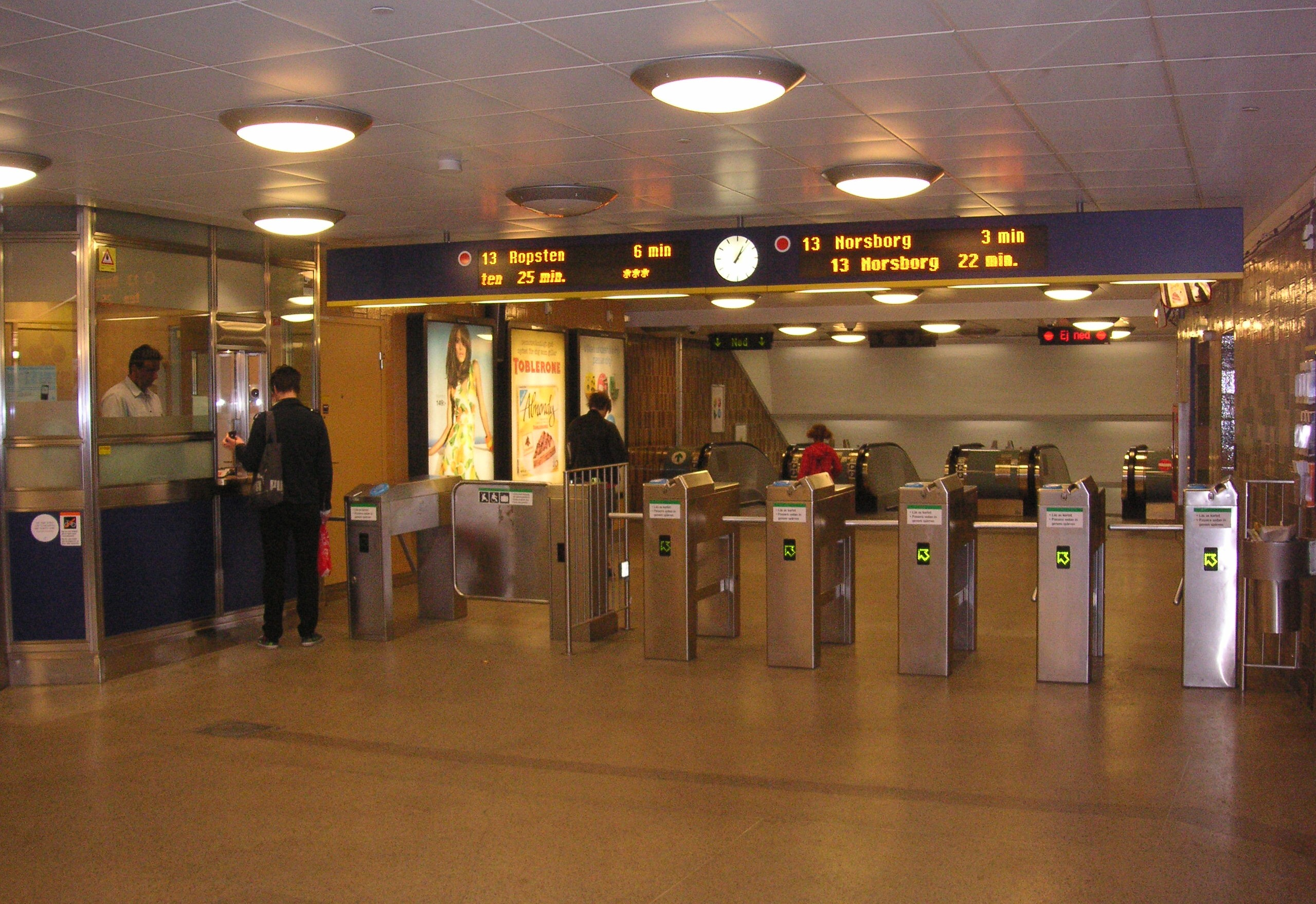
Ticket hall and barrier line

Platform with cross-tunnel (left)

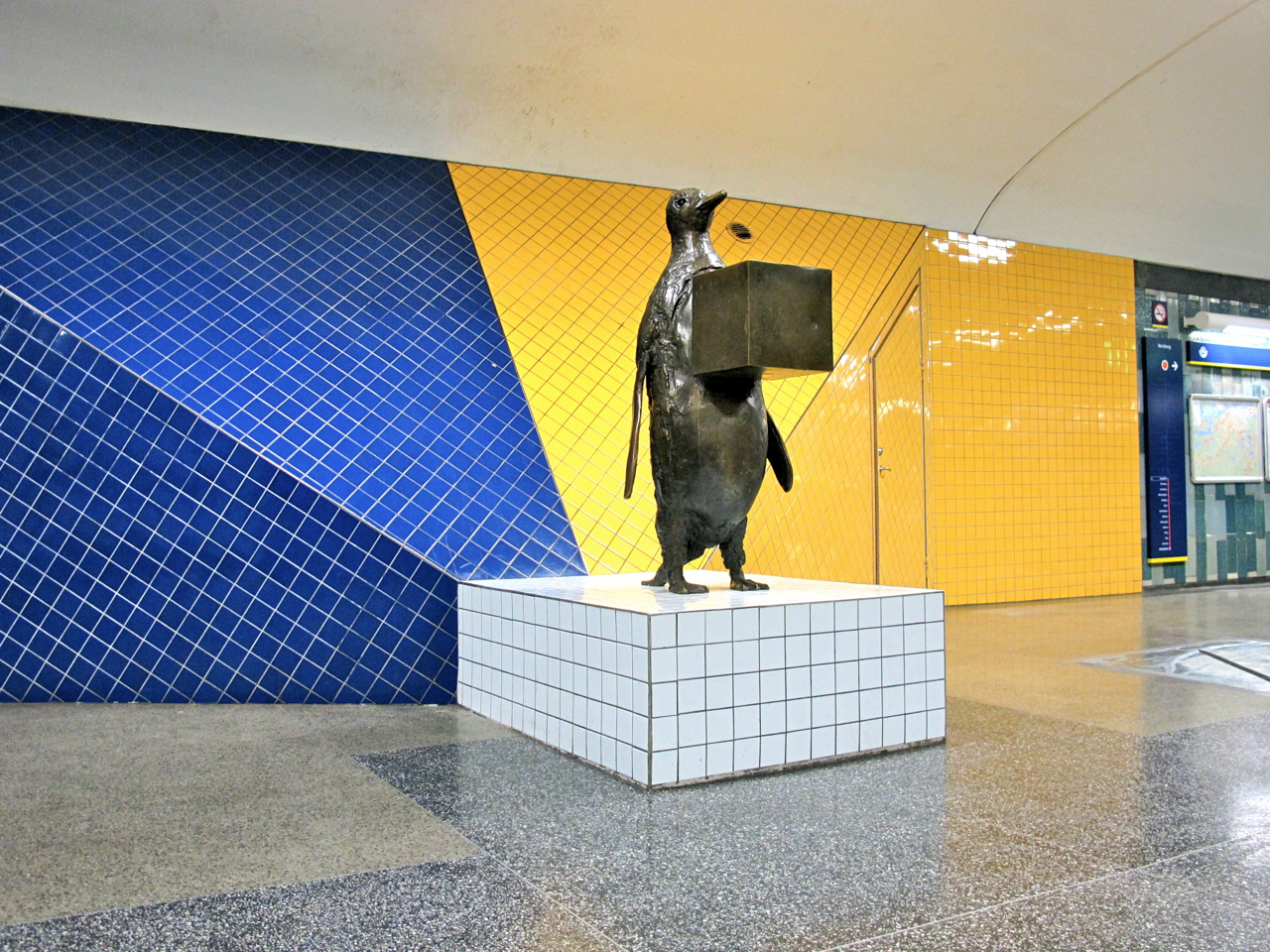
Penguin sculpture
