= Midsommarkransen metro station =

Stockholm Metro station

Midsommarkransen
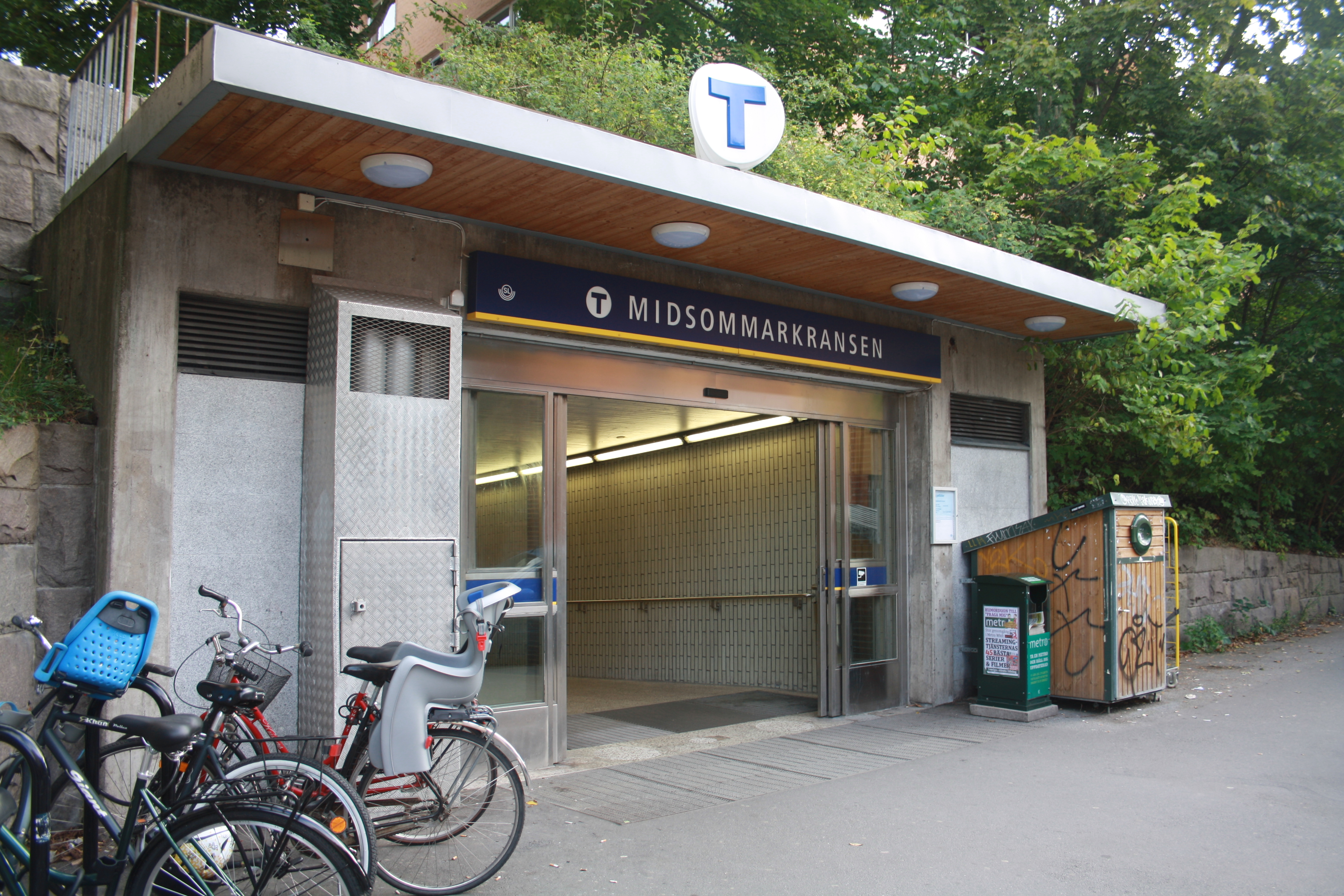
- One of the station entrances

General information
- Coordinates: 59°18′06″N 18°00′40″E
- Elevation: 23.5 m (77 ft) above sea level
- System: Stockholm Metro station
- Owner: Storstockholms Lokaltrafik
- Platforms: 2 side platforms
- Tracks: 2

Construction
- Structure type: Underground
- Depth: 17 m (56 ft) below ground
- Parking: Yes
- Cycle facilities: Yes
- Accessible: Yes

Other information
- Station code: MIK

History
- Opened: 5 April 1964; 62 years ago

Passengers
- 2019: 6,450 boarding per weekday (metro)

Services
Preceding station	Stockholm Metro	Following station
Telefonplan towards Fruängen	Line 14	Liljeholmen towards Mörby centrum
Location
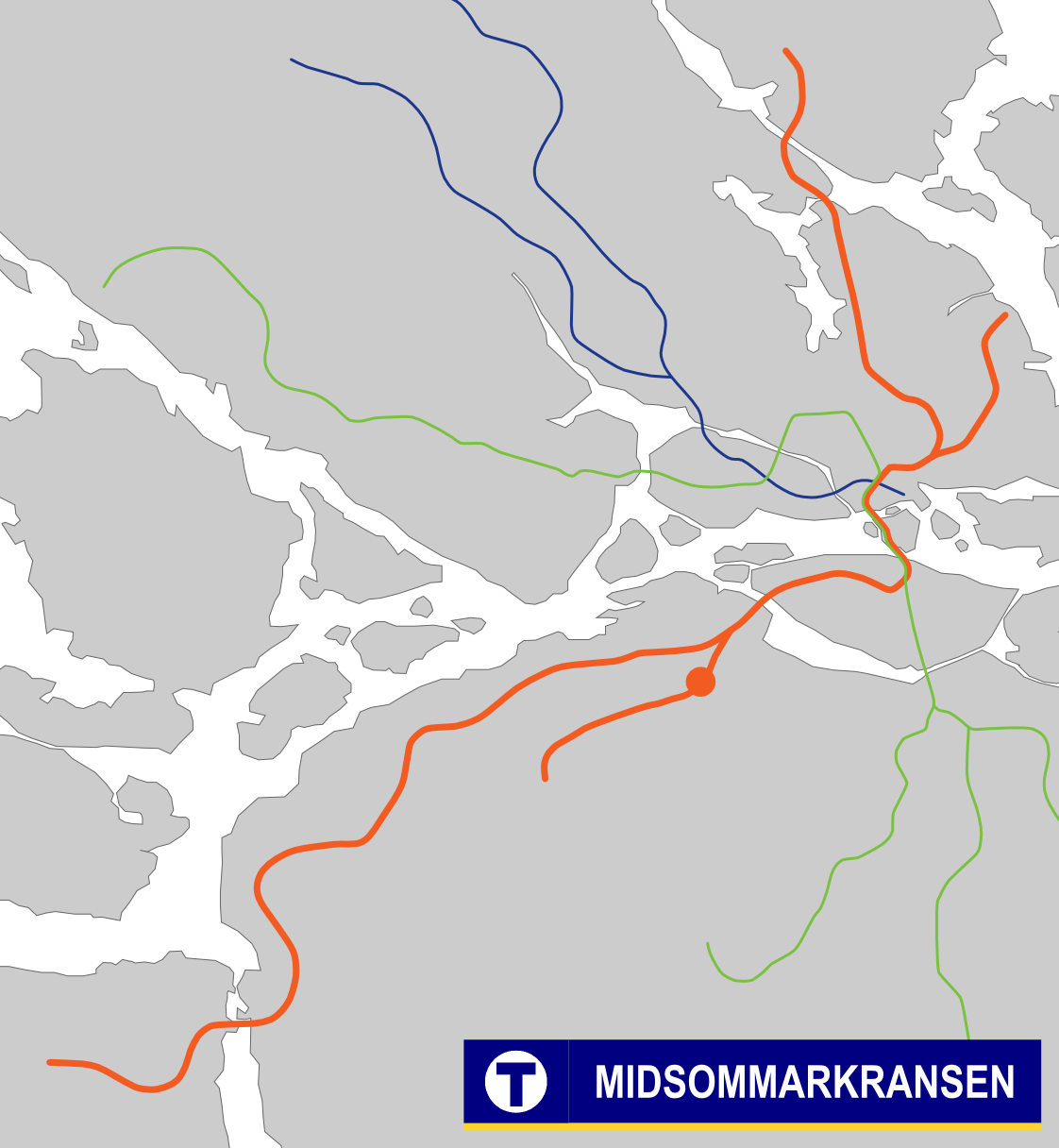

Midsommarkransen is a station on route 14 of the Red Line of the Stockholm Metro, located in Midsommarkransen, Stockholm City, Sweden. The station was opened on 5 April 1964 as part of the first stretch of the Red Line, between T-Centralen and Fruängen. The distance to Slussen is 4.6 km (2.9 mi).

The station is 17 m (56 ft) below ground and has two tracks, each in a separate tunnel and served by a side platform. The two platforms are situated between the tracks in a back-to-back configuration and connected together by a cross tunnel, thus functioning like a single island platform.

There are two street entrances, both giving access to a single basement level ticket hall and barrier line by stairs and ramps. Access to the platforms is by escalator, lift and stairs.

The station is decorated with wooden wreaths in a play on the station name, which means midsummer wreath in Swedish. These were created in 1979 by local residents under the guidance of Anna Flemström, Stina Zetterman and Hans Nilsson. On the platform there is also the work Blommor till Midsommarkransen by Lisbet Lindholm from 1990.

== Gallery ==
The other station entrance

Platform level cross tunnel

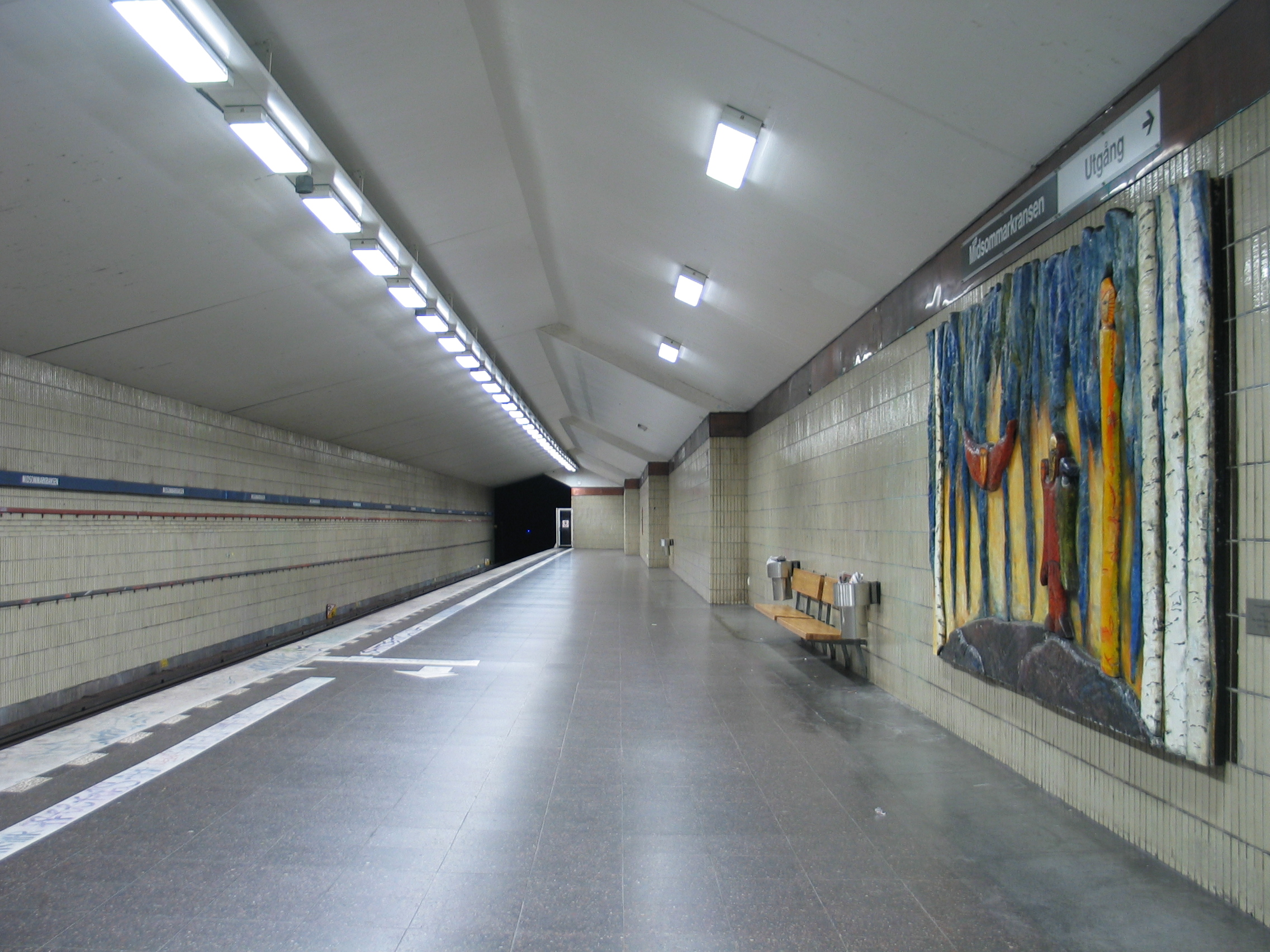
Platform

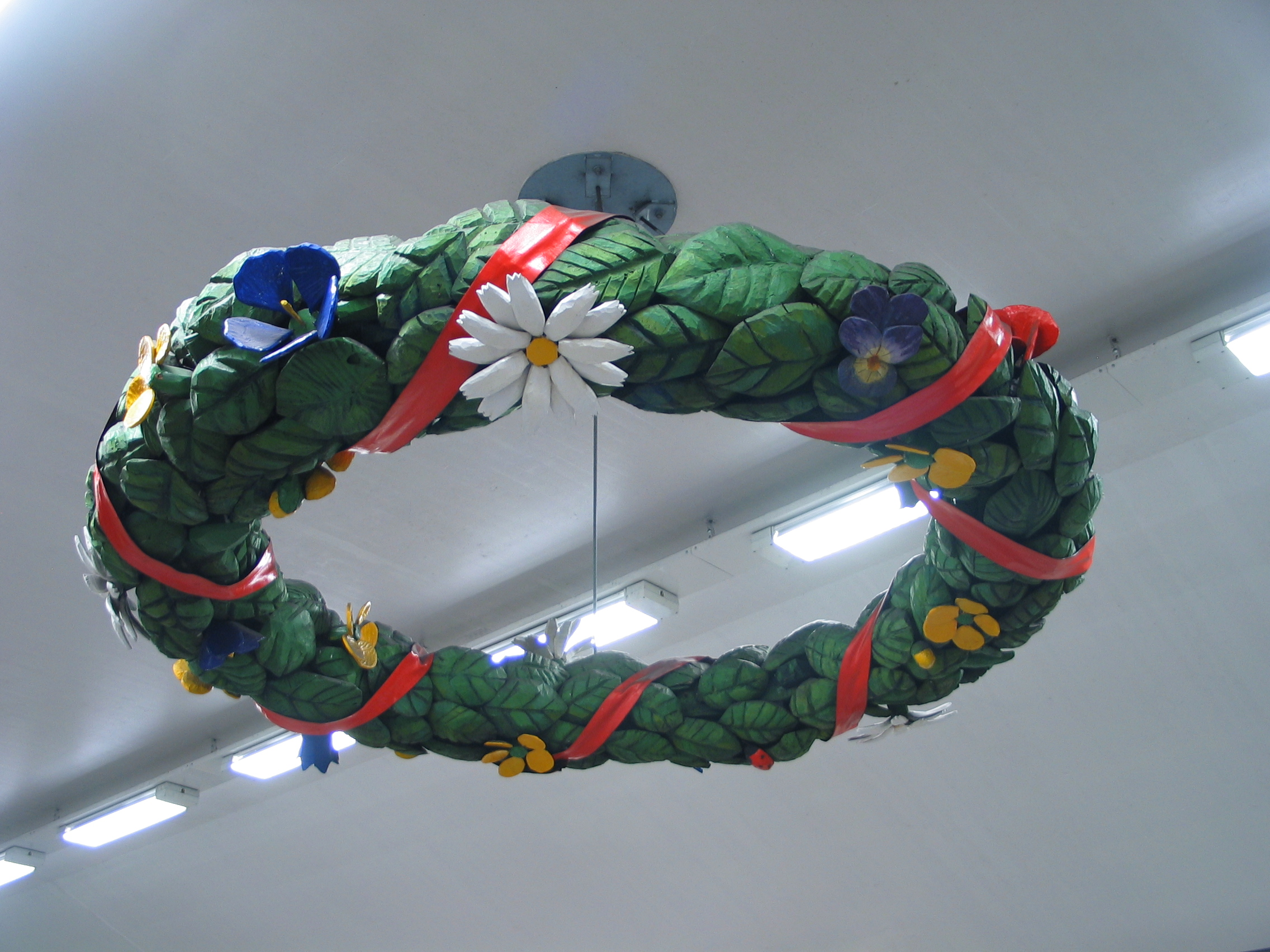
Wooden wreath
