= Aspudden =

Urban district in Stockholm, Sweden

Coordinates: 59°18′20″N 18°00′03″E

Aspudden (lit. 'Aspen cape') is a district of the Hägersten-Liljeholmen borough in Söderort, the southern suburban part of Stockholm, Sweden.

Metro Line 13 stops at Aspudden metro station.

== See also ==
- Aspudden metro station
- Geography of Stockholm
