= Midsommarkransen =

District of Stockholm, Sweden

Coordinates: 59°18′6″N 18°0′40″E

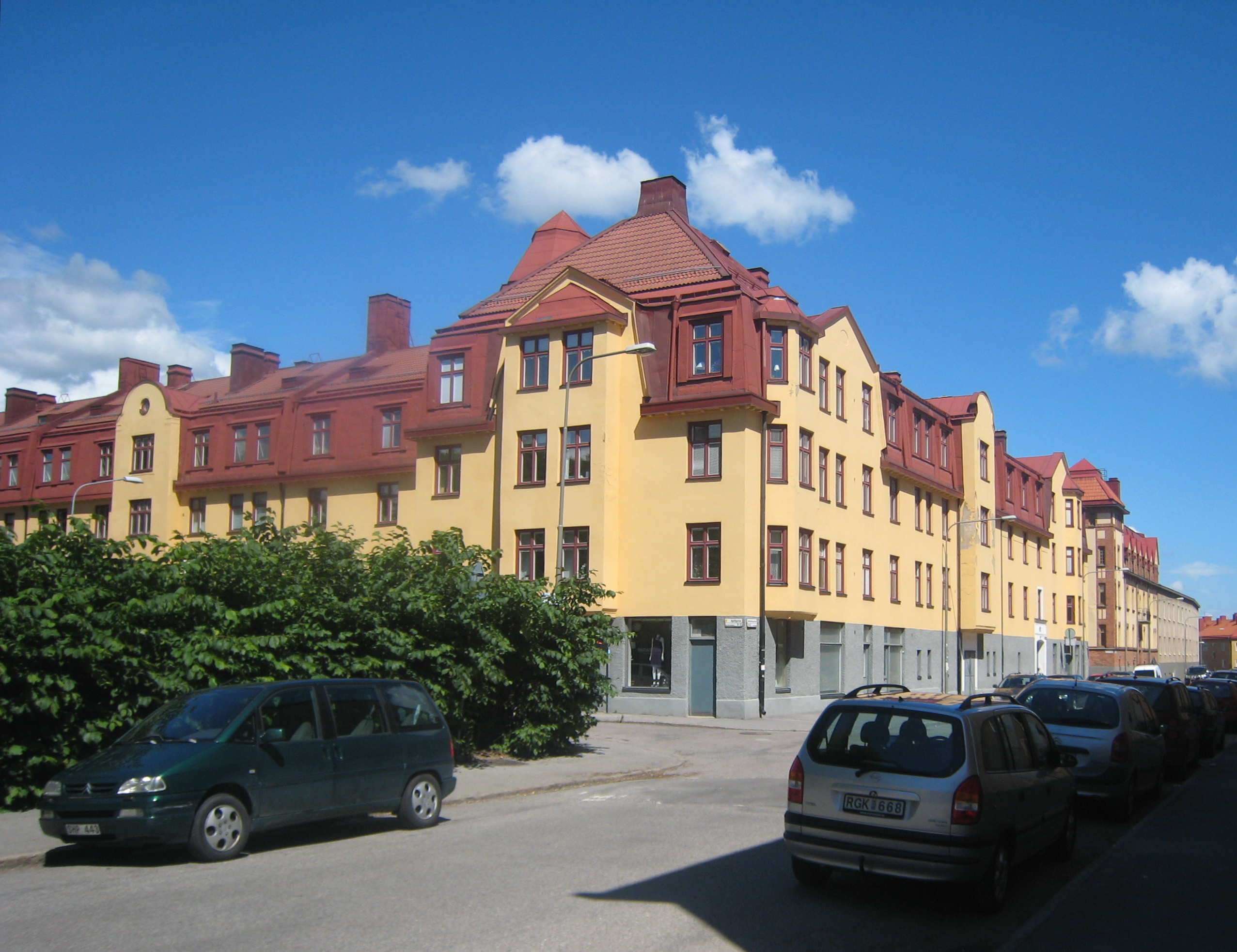
Midsommarkransen

Midsommarkransen (The Midsummer Wreath) is a suburban district of Stockholm with a history dating back to 1775.

The underground metro station opened in 1964.

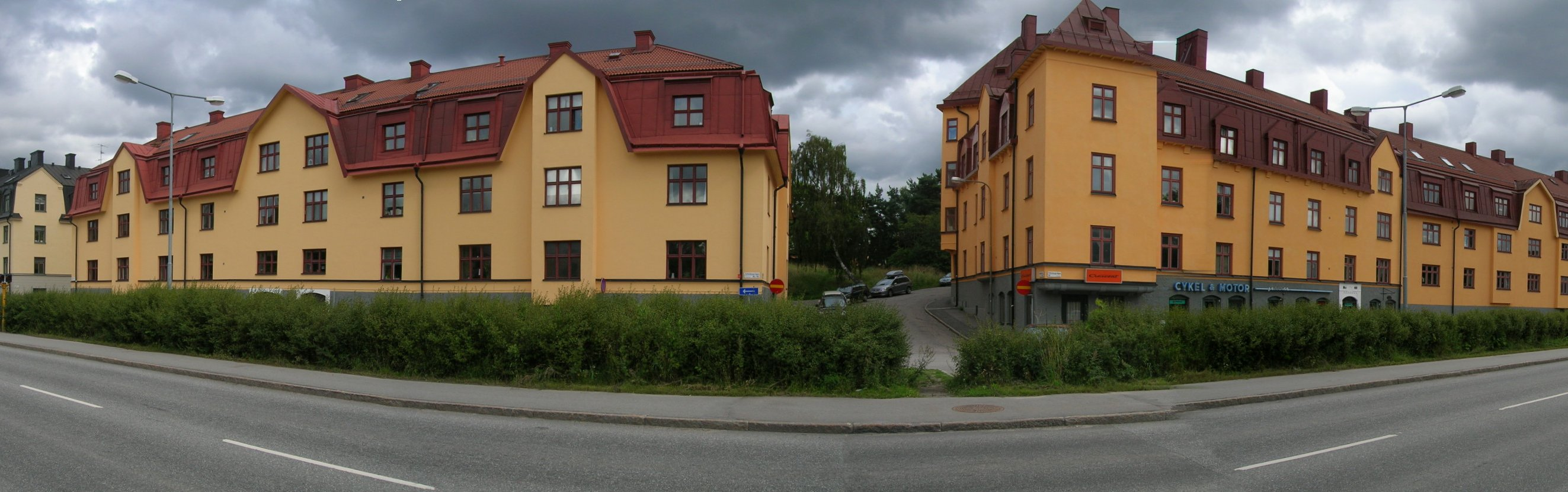
Midsommarkransen
