= Liljeholmen metro station =

Intermodal interchange station in Stockholm

Liljeholmen
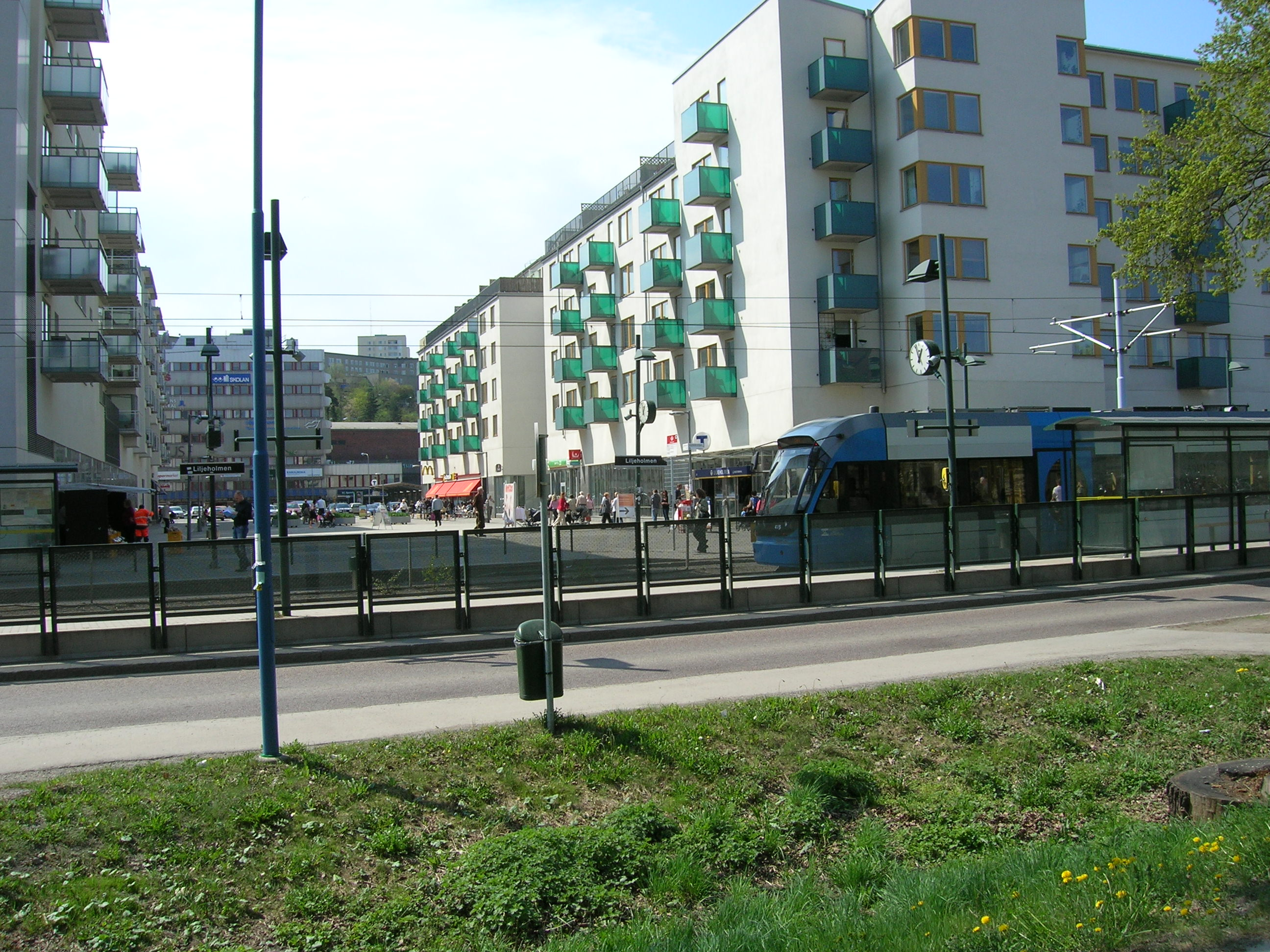
- Liljeholmen transport hub, with Tvärbanan in foreground and entrances to metro station behind. The bus terminus is below the square.

General information
- Coordinates: 59°18′37″N 18°1′21″E
- Elevation: 4.6 m (15 ft) above sea level
- System: Stockholm Metro station
- Owner: Storstockholms Lokaltrafik
- Platforms: 2 island platforms and 1 side platform (Red Line trains); 2 side platforms (Tvärbanan); 12 bays (Bus terminal)
- Tracks: 4 (2 for each T13 and T14); 2 (Tvärbanan)
- Connections: Tvärbanan tram

Construction
- Structure type: Partially underground
- Accessible: Yes

Other information
- Station code: LIH

History
- Opened: 5 April 1964; 62 years ago

Passengers
- 2019: 36,350 boarding per weekday (metro)
- 2019: 15,200 boarding per weekday (Tvärbanan)

Services
Preceding station	Stockholm Metro	Following station
Aspudden towards Norsborg	Line 13	Hornstull towards Ropsten
Midsommarkransen towards Fruängen	Line 14	Hornstull towards Mörby centrum

Other services
Preceding station	SL Local & Light Rail	Following station
Trekanten towards Solna station	Tvärbanan Line 30	Årstadal towards Sickla

Future services
Preceding station	Stockholm Metro	Following station
Fridhemsplan Terminus	Yellow Line	Årstaberg towards Älvsjö
Location
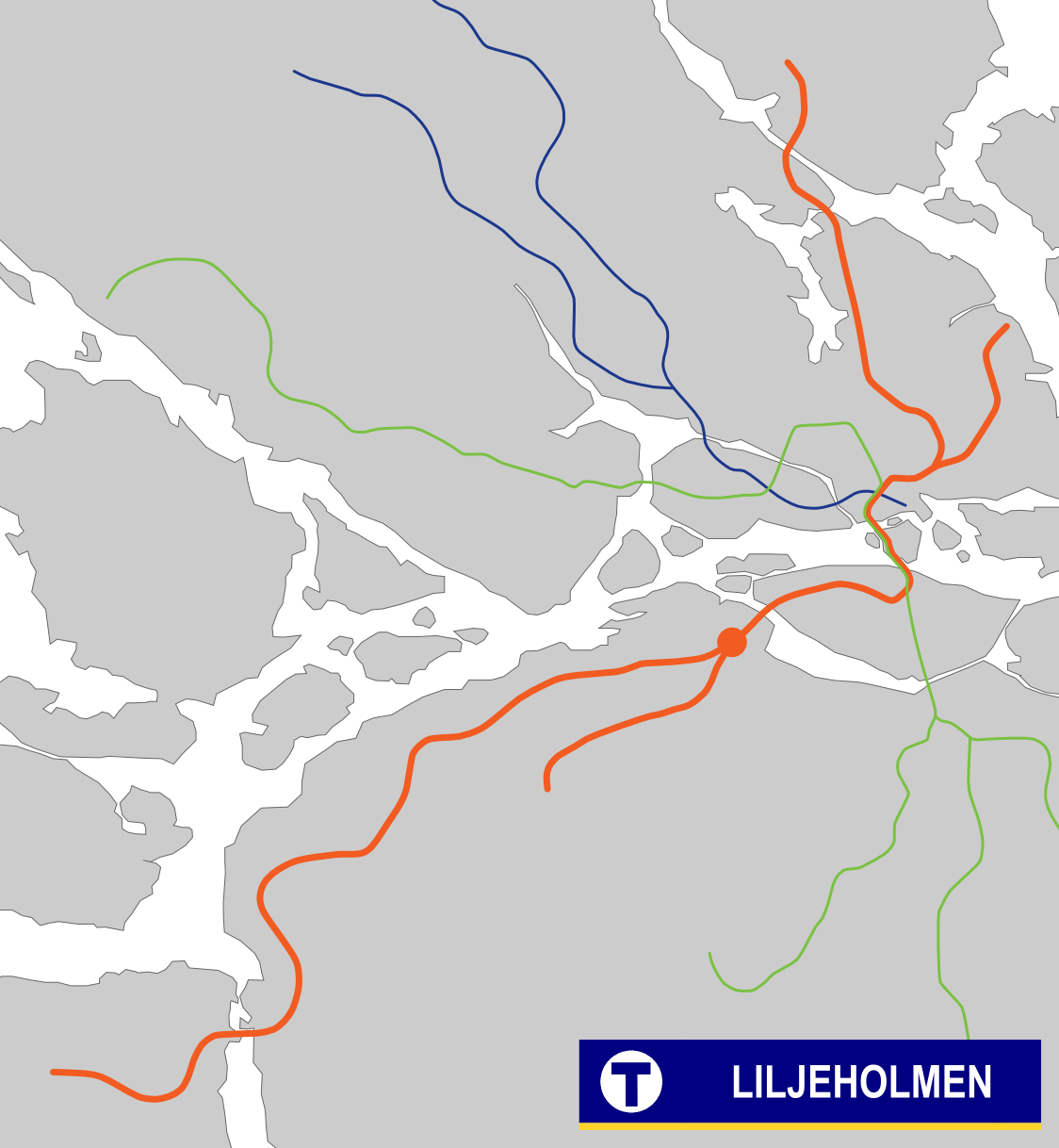

Liljeholmen is a station on the Stockholm Metro and Tvärbanan located in Liljeholmen, Stockholm, Sweden. It is served by routes 13 and 14 of the Red Line of the Stockholm Metro, by route 30 of the Tvärbanan light rail line, by a number of Stockholm bus routes.

The station is located by Liljeholmstorget square, and the Liljeholmstorget Galleria shopping centre.

== History ==
The metro station was opened on 5 April 1964 as part of the first section of the Red line, between T-Centralen and Fruängen, with a branch to Örnsberg. The Örnsberg branch was subsequently extended, in stages, to reach Norsborg in 1975. As originally built, Liljeholmen was a surface-level station with two platforms and a single exit at the western end, adjacent to the (then) bus terminal and the Nybohov lift.

The Tvärbanan opened between Gullmarsplan and Liljeholmen in January 2000, followed by an extension from Liljeholmen to Alvik later that year. A second exit was added, providing an interchange between the Tvärbanan tramway stop and the metro station.

In the period up until 2009, the station was renovated into an indoor facility (though still above ground) and expanded with a third platform, alongside an existing track, for trains heading to Fruängen and Norsborg. The redevelopment also included a new underground bus terminal, with squares and residential buildings constructed above the station.

== Operation ==
=== Metro station ===
The platforms of the metro station are situated at ground level, but enclosed by the development above it. There are two ticket halls and barrier lines, both located above the platforms. One is at the west end of the platforms, the other to the east. Both are linked to the platforms by escalators, steps and lifts. Both ticket halls are accessible directly from the square above.

There are four tracks served by one side platform and two island platforms. The most southerly track is served by both the side platform and one of the island plaforms, and is used by trains towards Norsborg and Fruängen. The next track, on the other side of the island platform, is used by trains terminating at Liljeholmen. The remaining two tracks, on either side of the second island platform, are used by trains towards Ropsten and Mörby centrum.

To the west of Liljeholmen, the tracks divide into three tunnelled double track routes in a set of grade separated junctions. Two of these are the branches to Norsborg and Fruängen, whilst the third is a service connection to Nyboda Depot, a depot for subway trains and buses, situated in the southern part of Liljeholmen. To the east, the tracks converge into a double track route that passes under the Liljeholmsviken in an immersed tube tunnel.

=== Bus terminus ===
The bus terminus is situated at the same level as the metro station, immediately alongside the platform serving westbound metro trains. The are 12 bus stop bays within the terminus, which is within the barrier lines of the metro station.

=== Tram stop ===
The Tvärbanan tram stop is situated in the open air above the metro station and to its east, with the alignment of the tram tracks crossing that of the metro tracks at a right angle. The tracks are served by two side platforms, which are outside the barrier lines of the metro station but directly accessible on the level from the eastern ticket hall of the metro.

=== Nybohov lift ===
The Nybohov lift was built, concurrently with the metro station, to provide a link to the Nybohovsberget, a nearby hilltop residential area. It is a funicular railway, with a single car running on a 230 m (750 ft) long track that rises 27 m (89 ft). Its lower platform is outside the barrier lines of the metro station and accessed by a 140 m (460 ft) covered walkway from the western ticket hall.

== Art ==
The metro station features a concrete frieze with rock reliefs in the ticket hall, dating from 1964 and by Carl-Axel Lunding. This is complemented by glass mosaic images of human heads, dating from 2005 and by Fredrik Landergren.

== Future ==
In the future, Liljeholmen is planned to serve as an interchange station with the Metro's Yellow Line, which is expected to open by 2035.

== Gallery ==
Entrance to metro and bus terminal

Ticket hall and barrier line

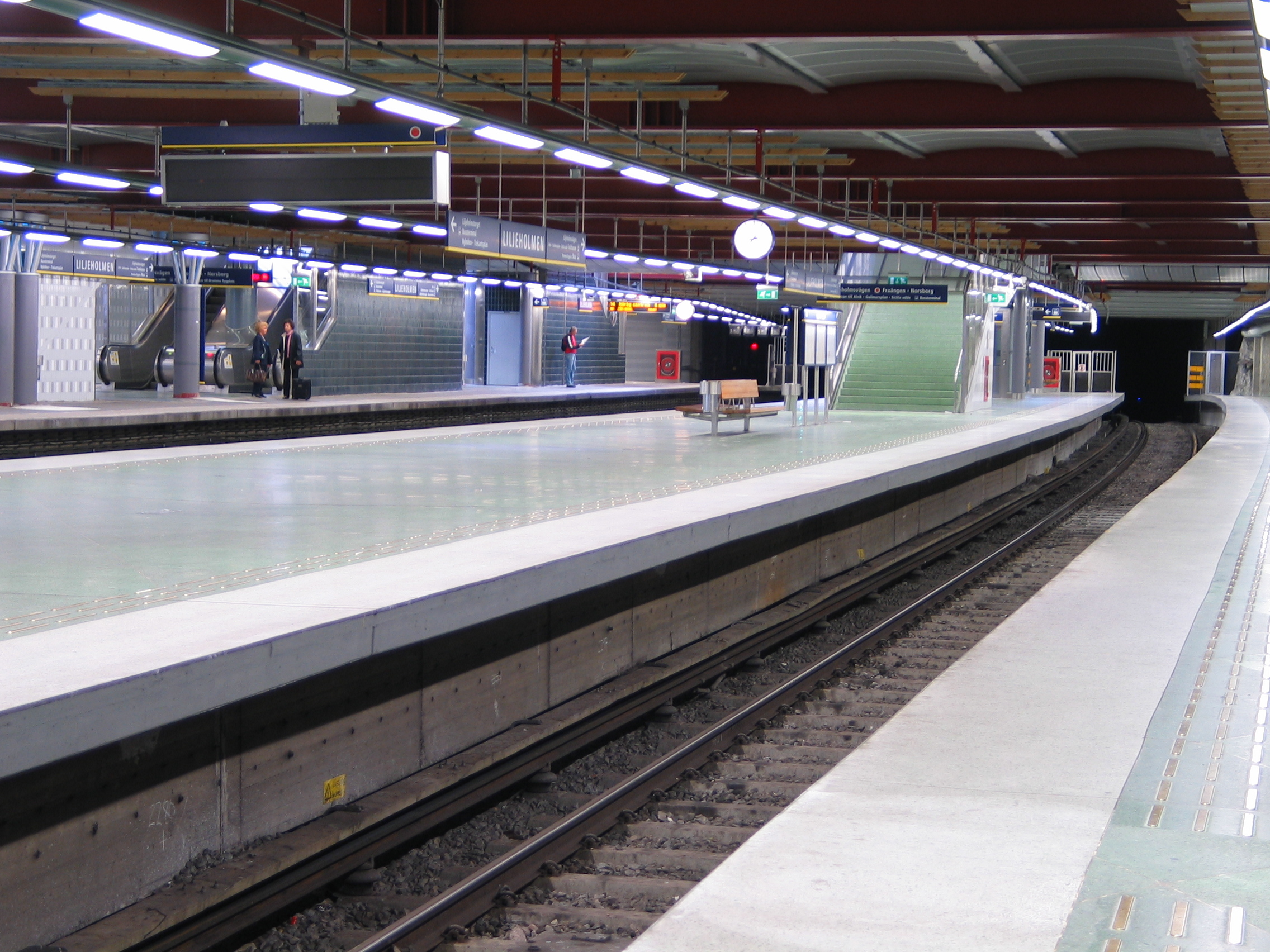
Metro platforms

The bus terminal

Tram stop
