= Nyboda depot =

Swedish depot

Coordinates: 59°18′20″N 18°00′56″E

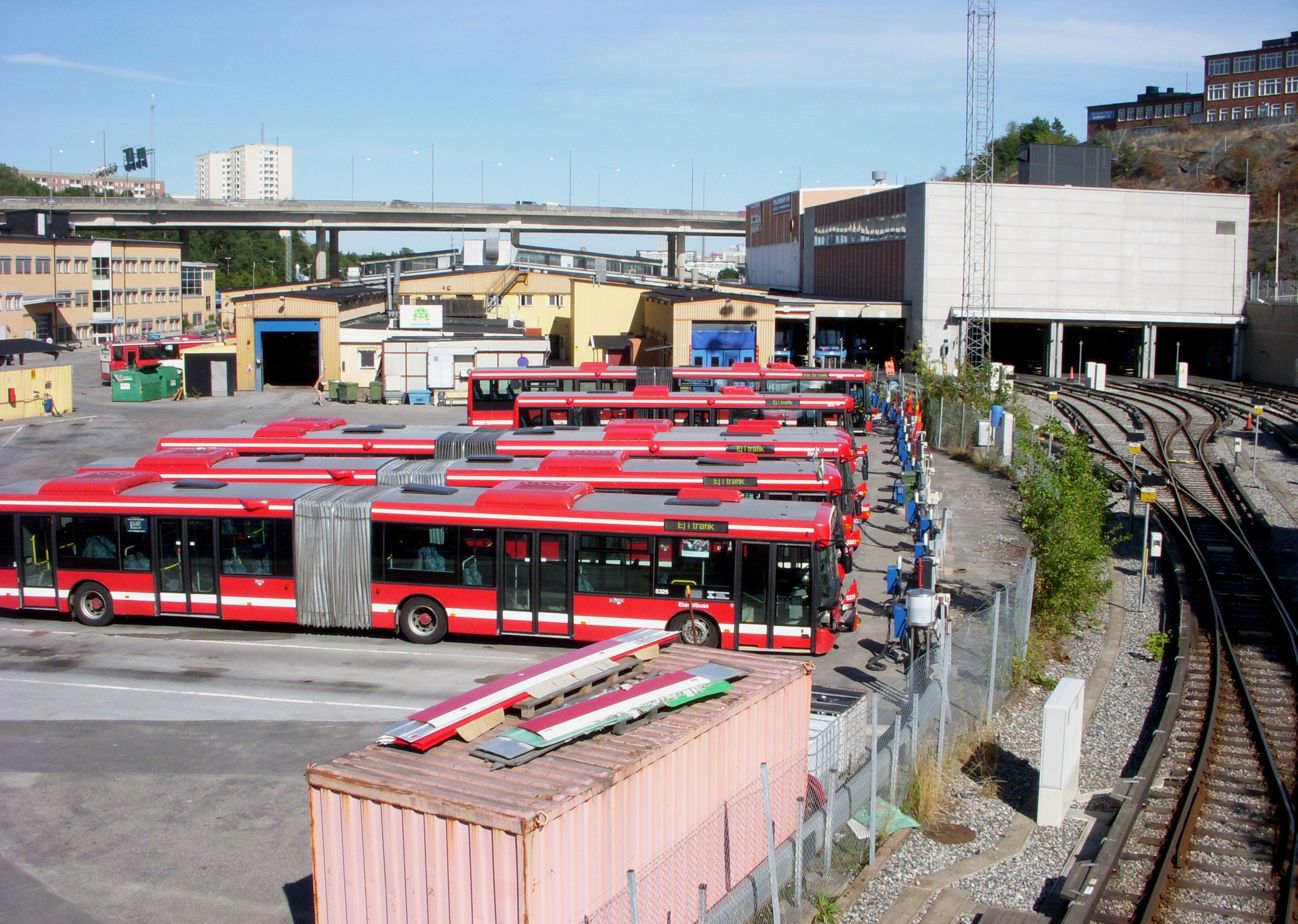
SL buses at the depot in August 2010

Nyboda depot (in Swedish: Nybodadepån or Nybodahallen) is a garage/depot for subway trains and buses of Storstockholms Lokaltrafik (SL), located in Liljeholmen, Stockholm Municipality, along Hägerstensvägen and under Essingeleden. Nybodadepån is connected with Liljeholmen metro station via a bridge over Hägerstensvägen and a tunnel in the mountain under Nybohov.

Nybodadepån started operations for buses and trams in 1945, then called Brännkyrkahallen. 1963–64, it was rebuilt to be adapted for the cars of Stockholm Metro. It could house 30 railway cars on four tracks in a bus garage and another 64 on four tracks in two rock tunnels. 2001–2002, it was rebuilt to be adapted for the new C20 metro cars and was further upgraded to C30s in 2019.

Around 100 persons are employed at the depot, which is one of five depots serving the Stockholm metro system.
