= Mälarhöjden metro station =

Stockholm Metro station

Mälarhöjden
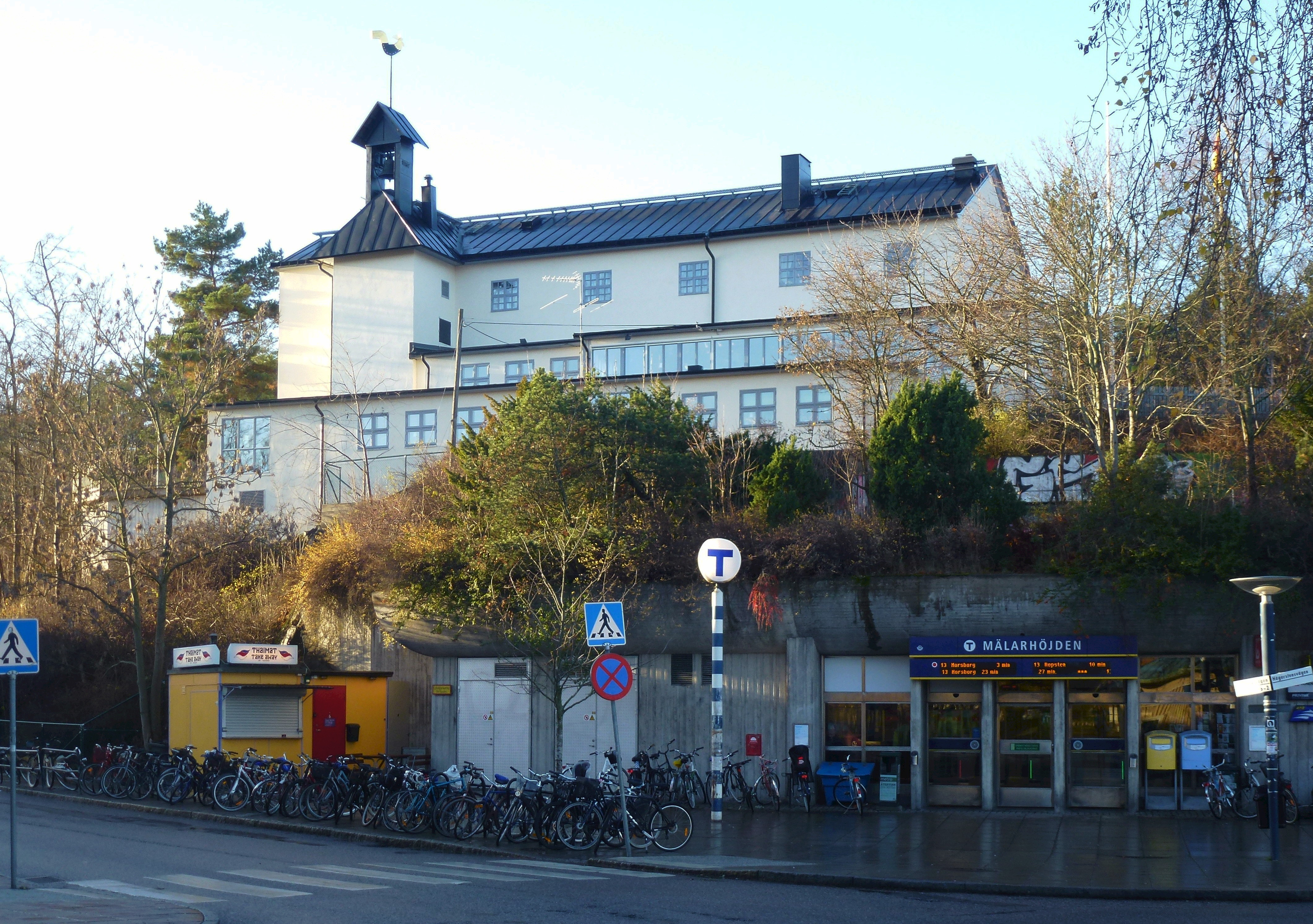
- Mälarhöjdens church and metro entrance

General information
- Coordinates: 59°18′03″N 17°57′21″E
- Elevation: 24.6 m (81 ft) above sea level
- System: Stockholm Metro station
- Owner: Storstockholms Lokaltrafik
- Platforms: 2 side platforms
- Tracks: 2

Construction
- Structure type: Underground
- Depth: 33 m (108 ft)
- Accessible: Yes

Other information
- Station code: MÄH

History
- Opened: 16 May 1965; 61 years ago

Passengers
- 2019: 2,600 boarding per weekday

Services
Preceding station	Stockholm Metro	Following station
Bredäng towards Norsborg	Line 13	Axelsberg towards Ropsten
Location
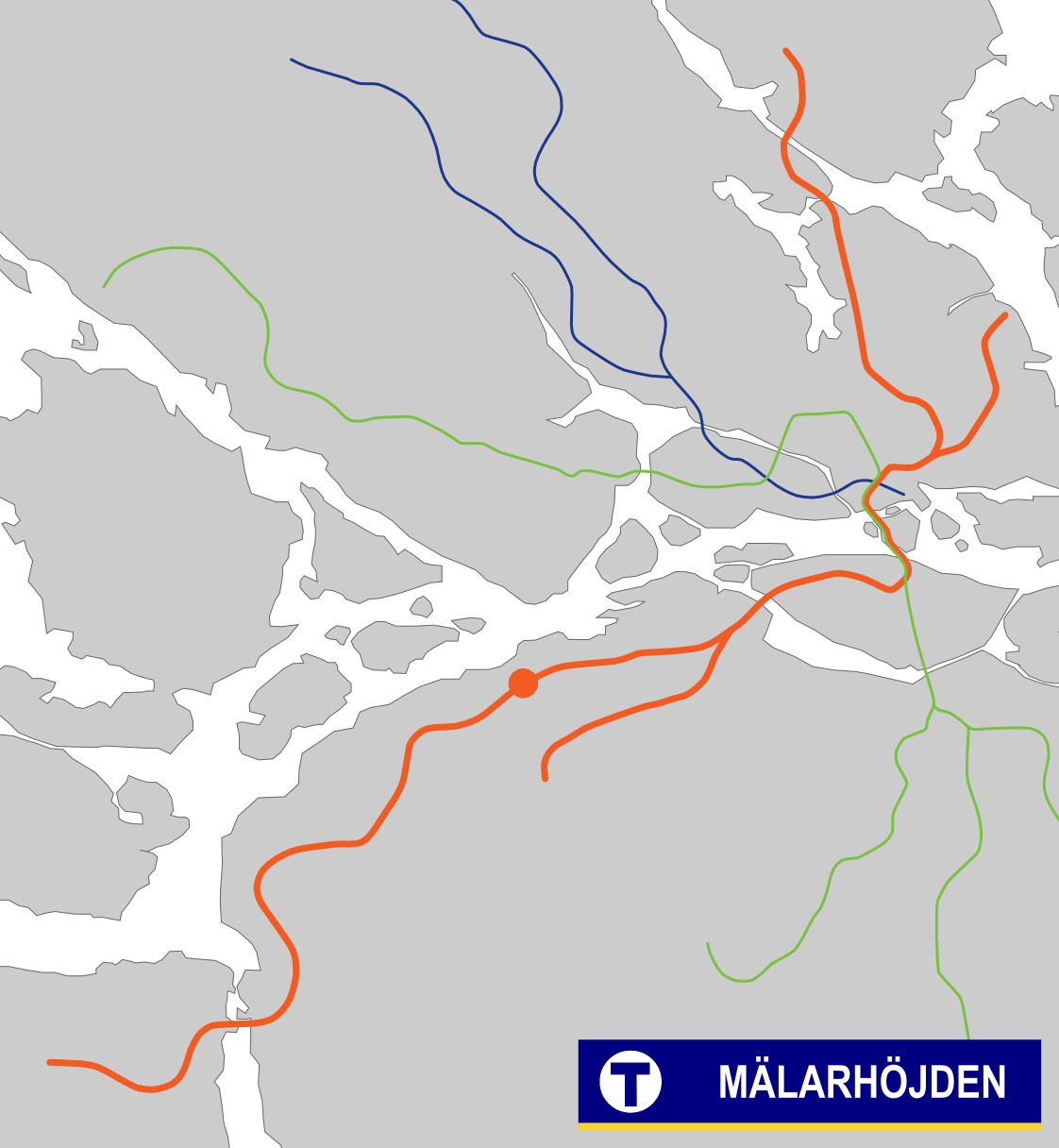

Mälarhöjden is a station on Line 13 of the Red Line of the Stockholm Metro, located in Mälarhöjden, Stockholm City, Sweden. The station opened on 16 May 1965 as part of the extension from Örnsberg to Sätra. It is 7.5 km (4.7 mi) from the Slussen.

The station is between 10 m (33 ft) to 34 m (112 ft) below ground and has two tracks, each in a separate tunnel and served by a side platform. The two platforms are situated between the tracks in a back-to-back configuration and connected together by cross tunnels, thus functioning like a single island platform.

The station has a single ticket hall and barrier line, situated at street level but tunnelled into the side of the hill below Mälarhöjden Church. Access to the platforms is by escalator, lift and stairs.

The platforms feature a 190 m (620 ft) long enamel painting by Margareta Carlstedt entitled Ebb och flod (Swedish for “ebb and flow") that dates from the opening of the station in 1965.

== Gallery ==
Station entrance

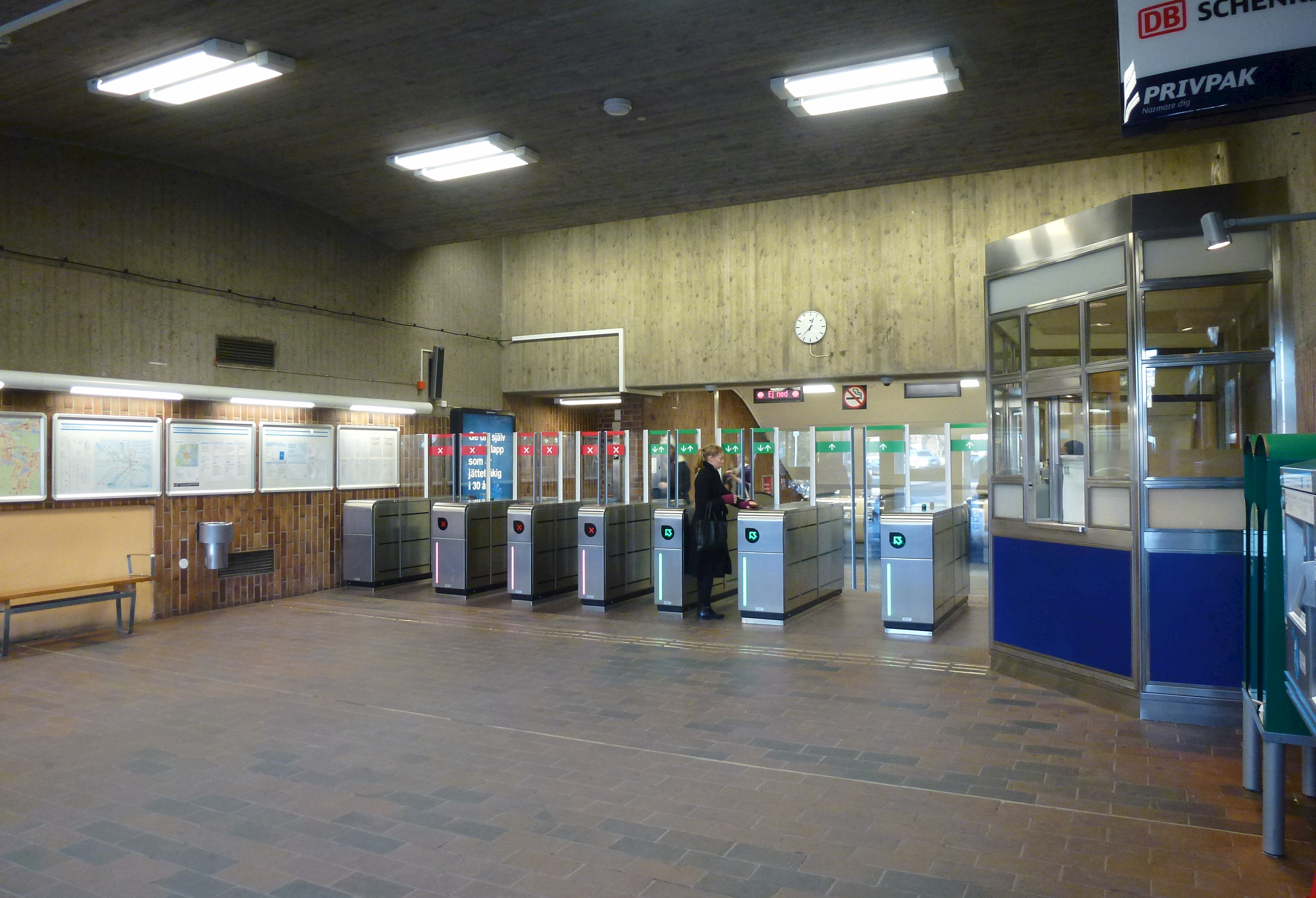
Ticket hall and barrier line

Plaform with Ebb och flod art work
