= Bredäng metro station =

Stockholm Metro station

Bredäng
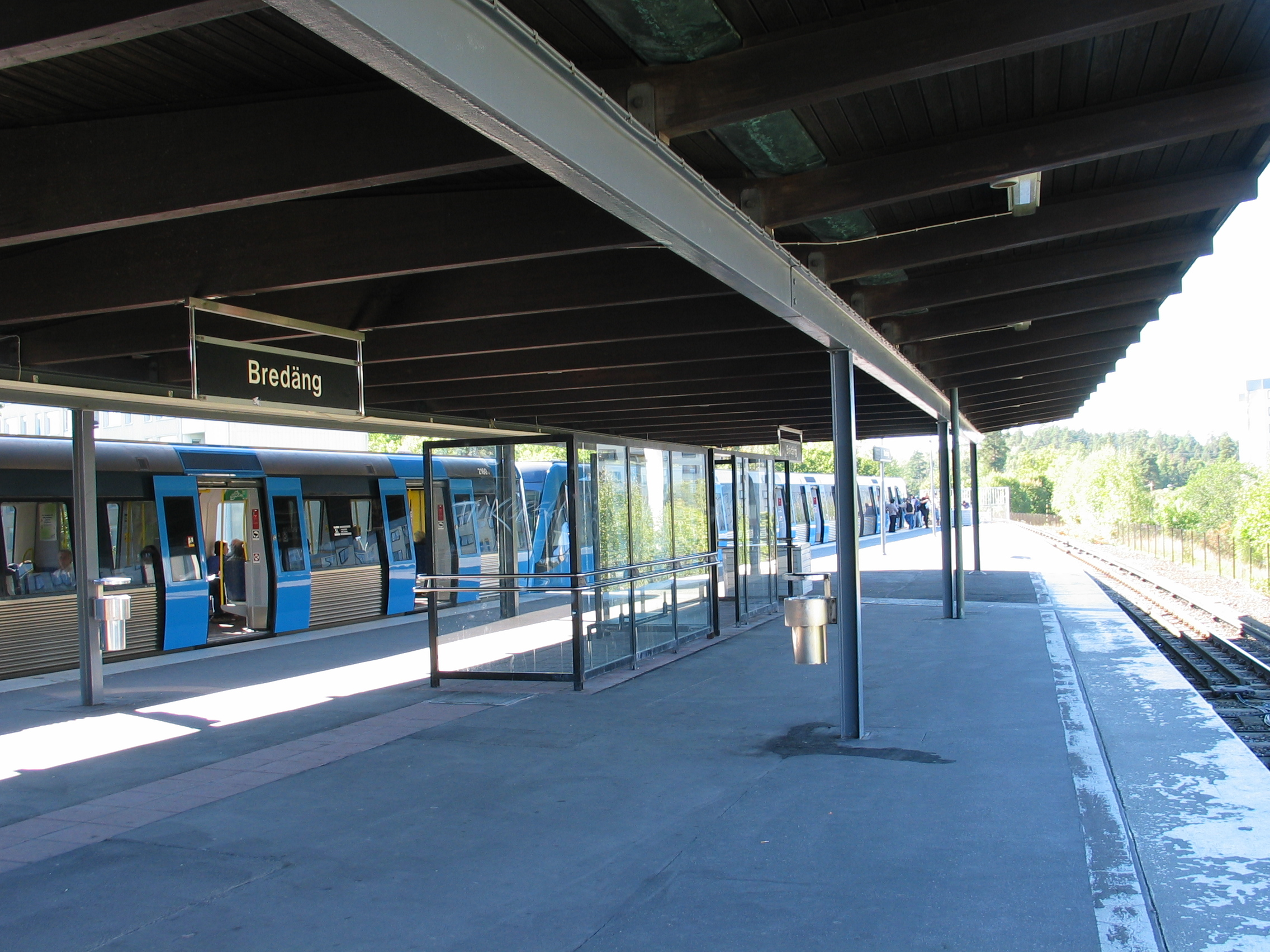

General information
- Coordinates: 59°17′42″N 17°56′02″E
- Elevation: 46.1 m (151 ft) above sea level
- System: Stockholm Metro station
- Owner: Storstockholms Lokaltrafik
- Platforms: 1 island platform
- Tracks: 2

Construction
- Structure type: Elevated
- Accessible: Yes

Other information
- Station code: BRÄ

History
- Opened: 16 May 1965; 61 years ago

Passengers
- 2019: 7,750 boarding per weekday

Services
Preceding station	Stockholm Metro	Following station
Sätra towards Norsborg	Line 13	Mälarhöjden towards Ropsten
Location
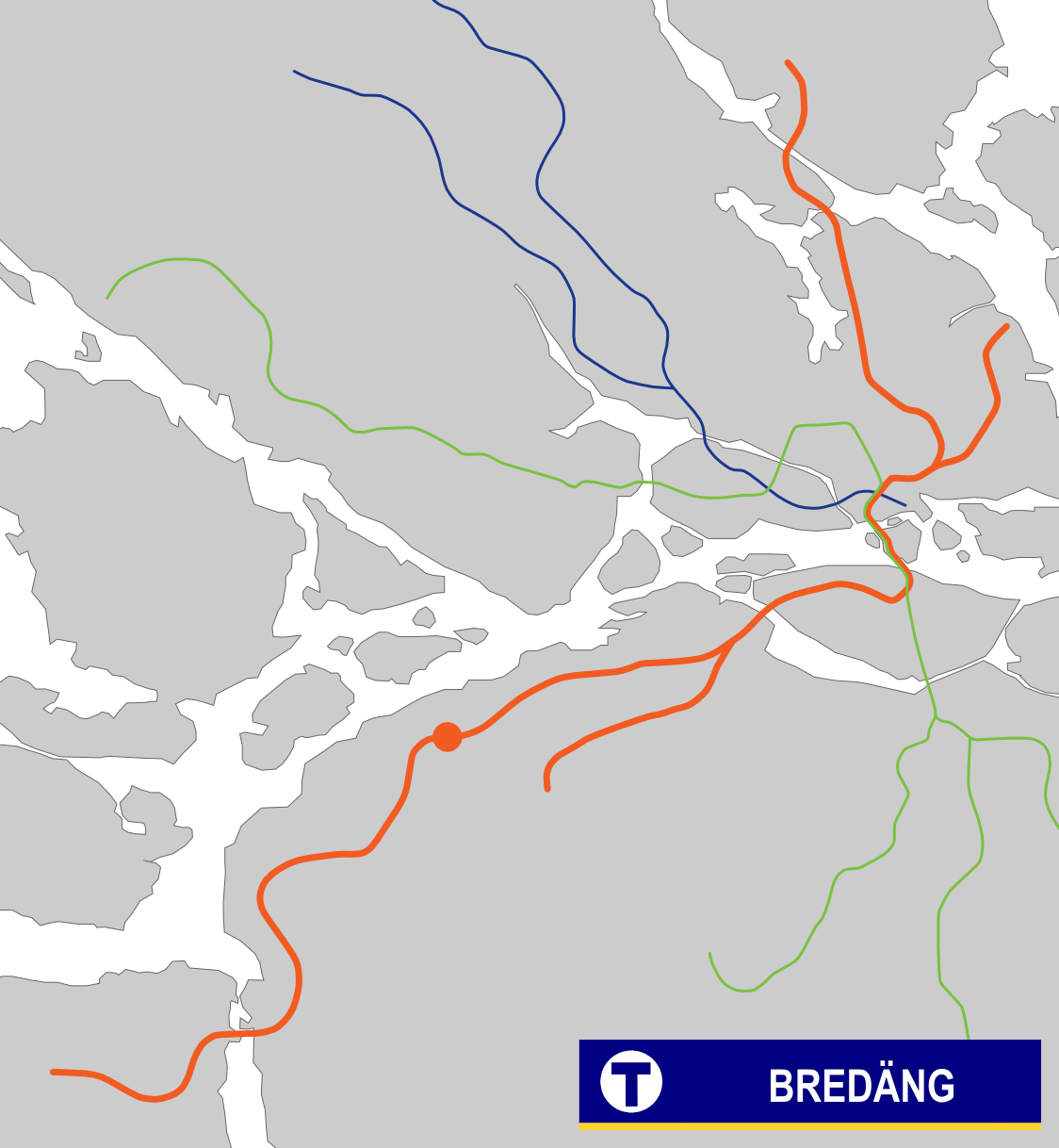

Bredäng is a station on Line 13 of the Red Line of the Stockholm Metro, located in Bredäng, Stockholm City, Sweden. The station opened on 16 May 1965 as part of the extension from Örnsberg to Sätra. It is 9 km (5.6 mi) from Slussen.

The station is elevated above street level on a 180 m (590 ft) viaduct and has two tracks served by a single central island platform. The tracks approach the station on a viaduct from the west and in a tunnel from the east.

The station has a single ticket hall at platform level, situated between the tracks at the eastern end of the station. It is accessible from street level by escalators, stairs and lifts. A secondary exit leads from the ticket hall via a ramp that rises between the tracks and passes over the tunnel entrance.

The ticket hall features Pusselbitar (Swedish for “puzzle pieces”), a series of wooden reliefs created by Lena Kriström, working with local residents. The artwork was installed in 1982, with additions in 1999.

== Gallery ==
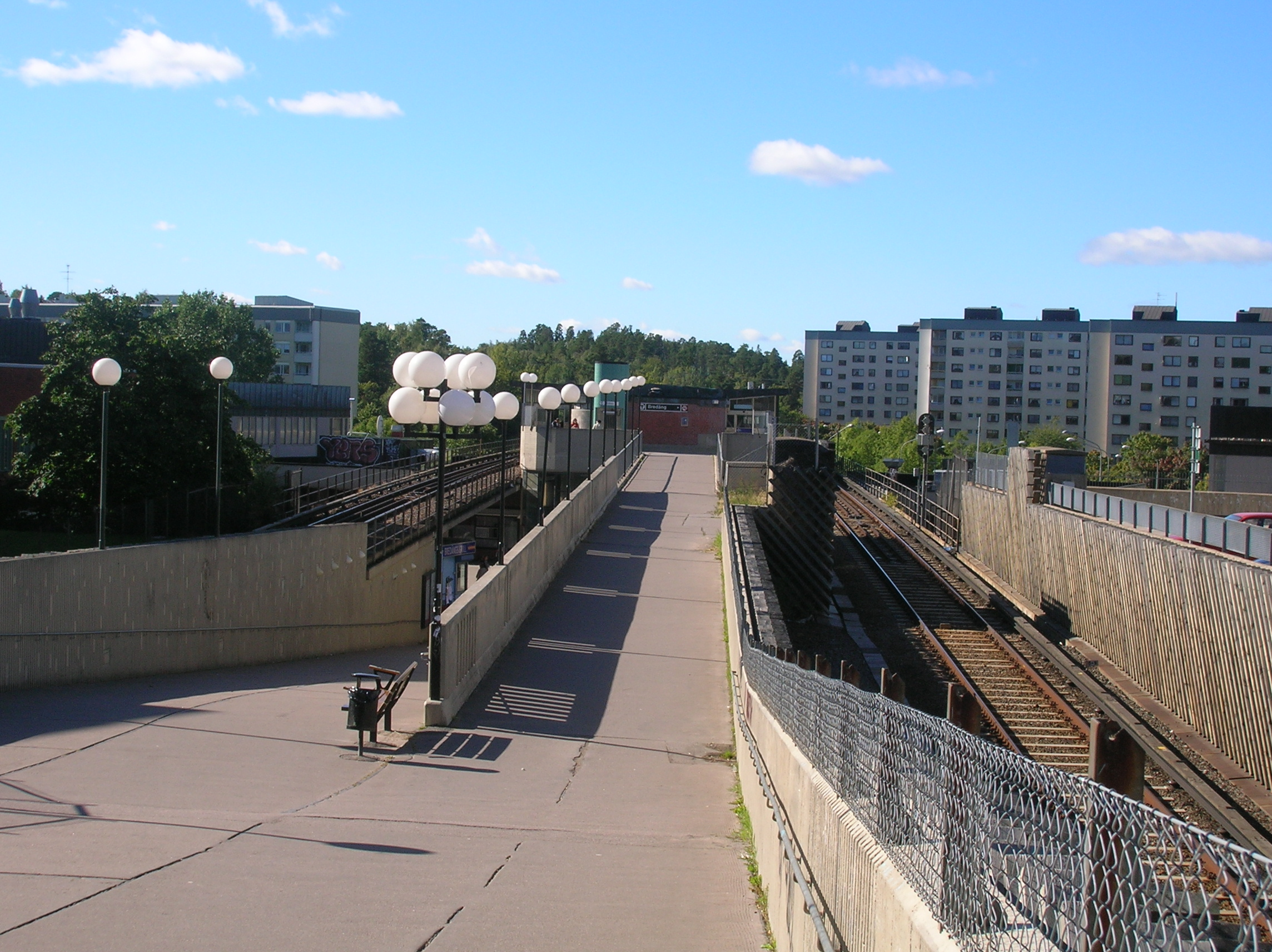
Station entrance from above

Station entrance from below

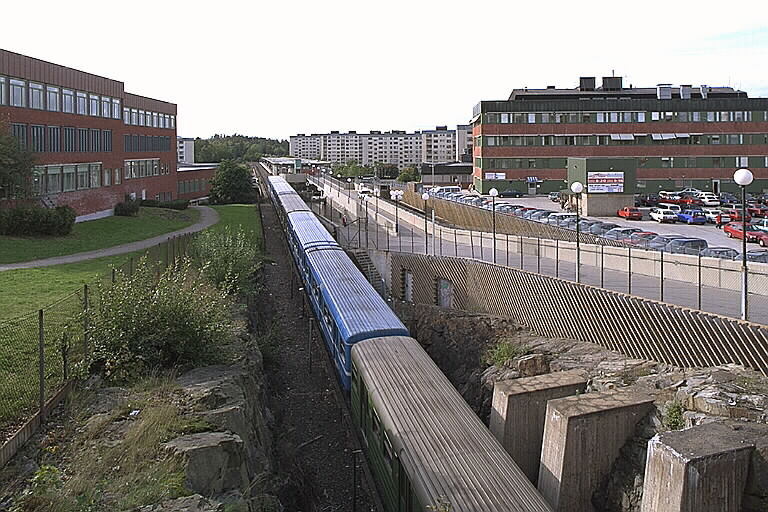
Station seen from above tunnel entrance

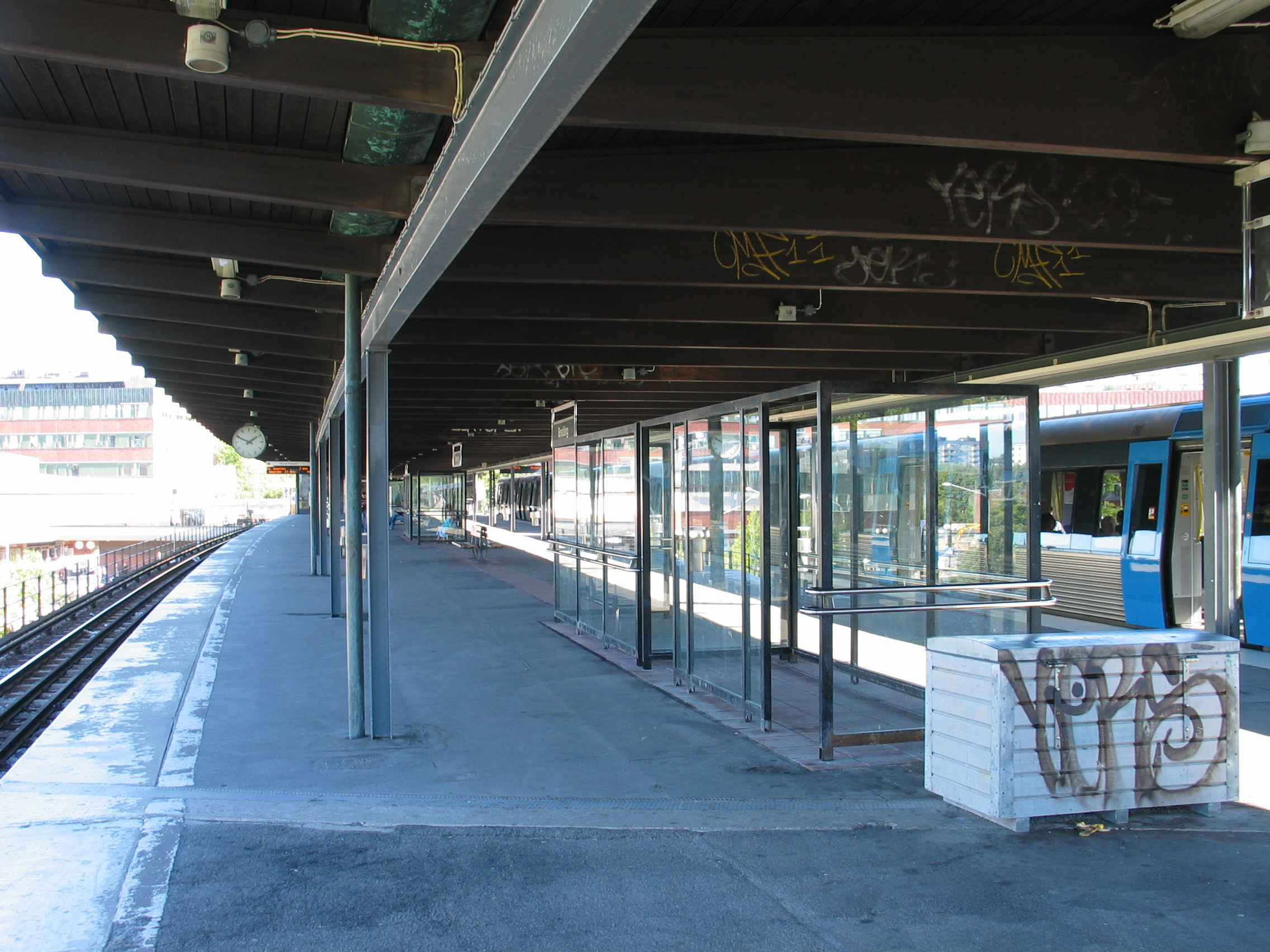
Platforms
