= Axelsberg metro station =

Stockholm Metro station

Axelsberg
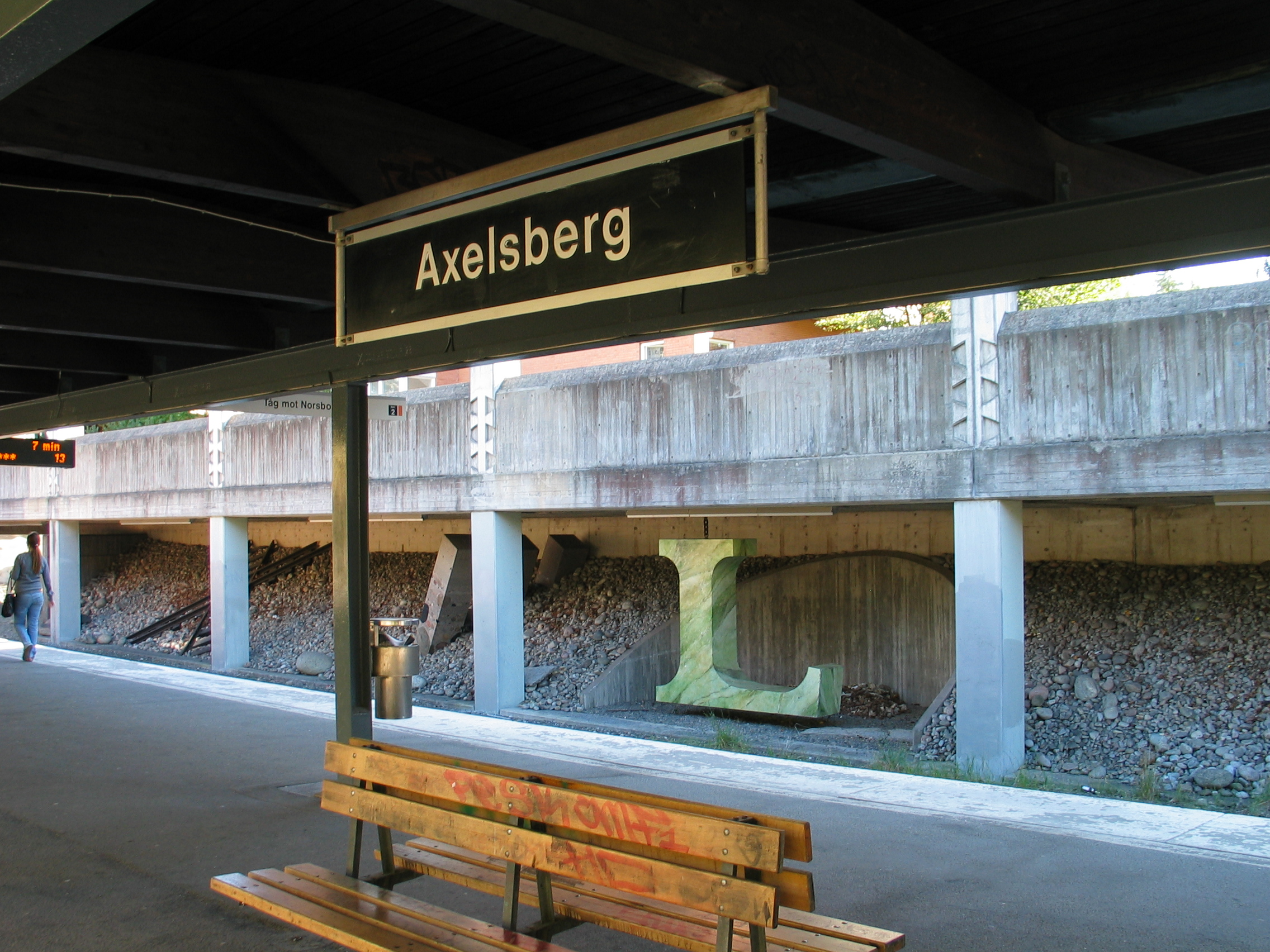
- The station name is spelled out in different materials, along the southbound track

General information
- Coordinates: 59°18′15″N 17°58′31″E
- Elevation: 18.8 m (62 ft) above sea level
- System: Stockholm Metro station
- Owner: Storstockholms Lokaltrafik
- Platforms: 1 island platform
- Tracks: 2

Construction
- Structure type: At grade
- Accessible: Yes

Other information
- Station code: AXB

History
- Opened: 16 May 1965; 61 years ago

Passengers
- 2019: 2,850 boarding per weekday

Services
Preceding station	Stockholm Metro	Following station
Mälarhöjden towards Norsborg	Line 13	Örnsberg towards Ropsten
Location
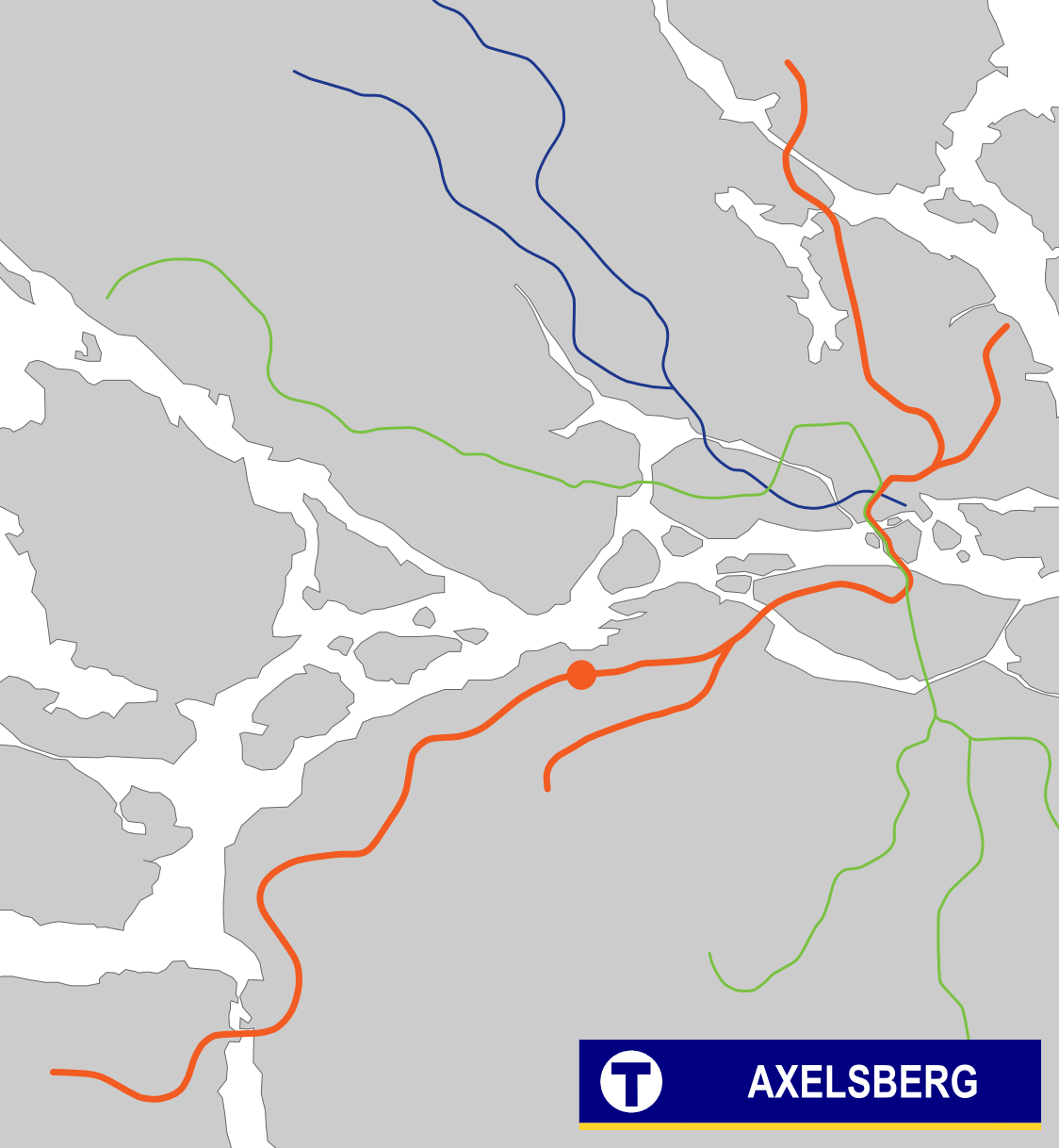

Axelsberg is a station on Line 13 of the Red Line of the Stockholm Metro, located in Axelsberg, Hägersten, Stockholm City, Sweden . The station was opened on 16 May 1965 as part of the extension from Örnsberg to Sätra. It is situated 6.4 km from Slussen.

The station is situated in an open cutting just below street level, and has two tracks and a single island platform. There is a single ticket hall, above the tracks at the eastern end of the platforms and accessed from a footbridge over the line. Access to the platforms is via ramps, stairs and lifts.

The station features an art work in which its name is spelled out in different materials along the southbound track. This uses glass, concrete, sand and iron, with the X formed by two crossing railway tracks. The work was executed in 1983 by Leif Bolter, Veine Johansson, Inga Modén and Gösta Wessel. In 1999, Gösta Wessel added a further work, comprising a tile-clad wall with a streak of black granite along the ramp and on the walls of the lift.

== Gallery ==
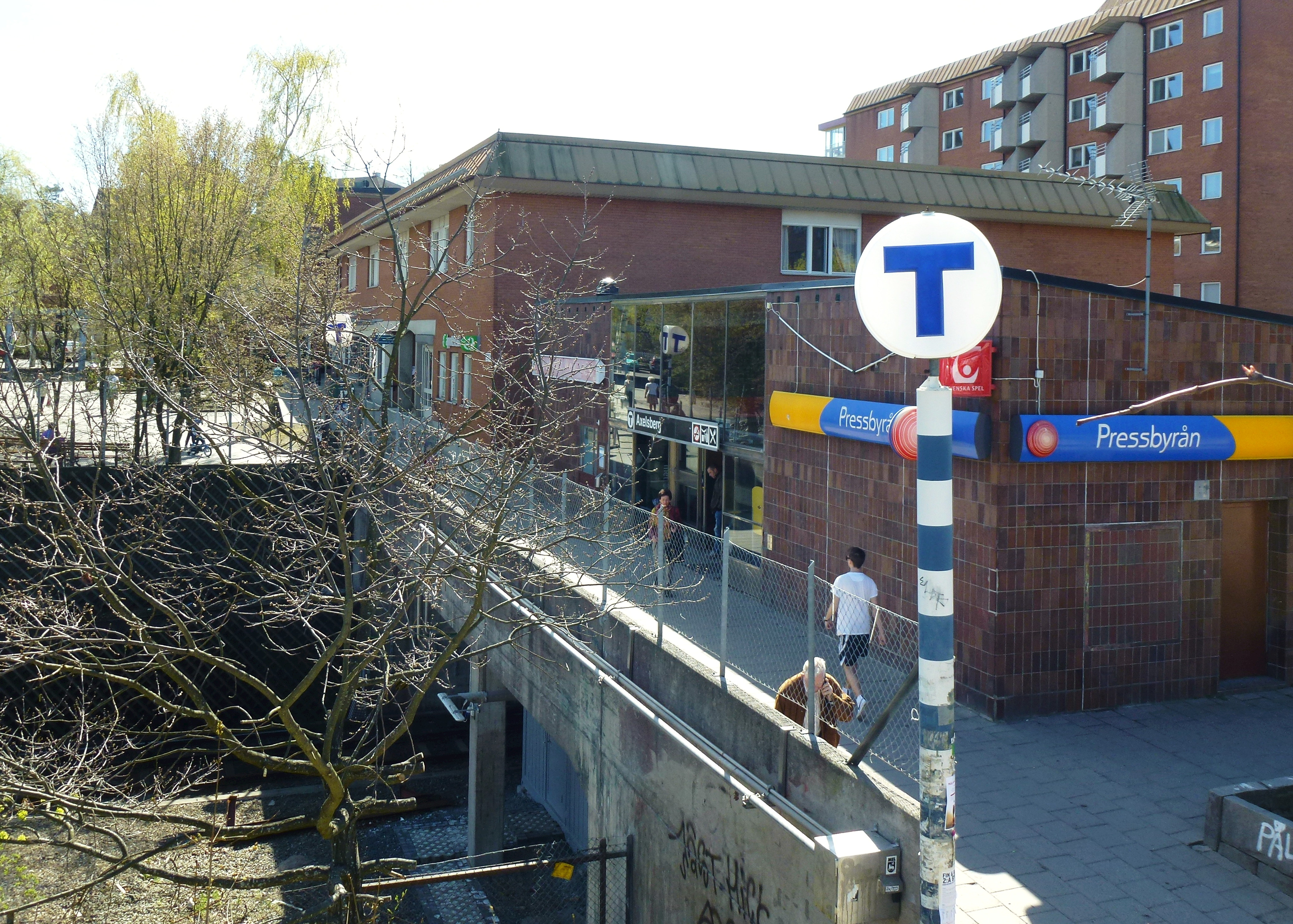
Station entrance

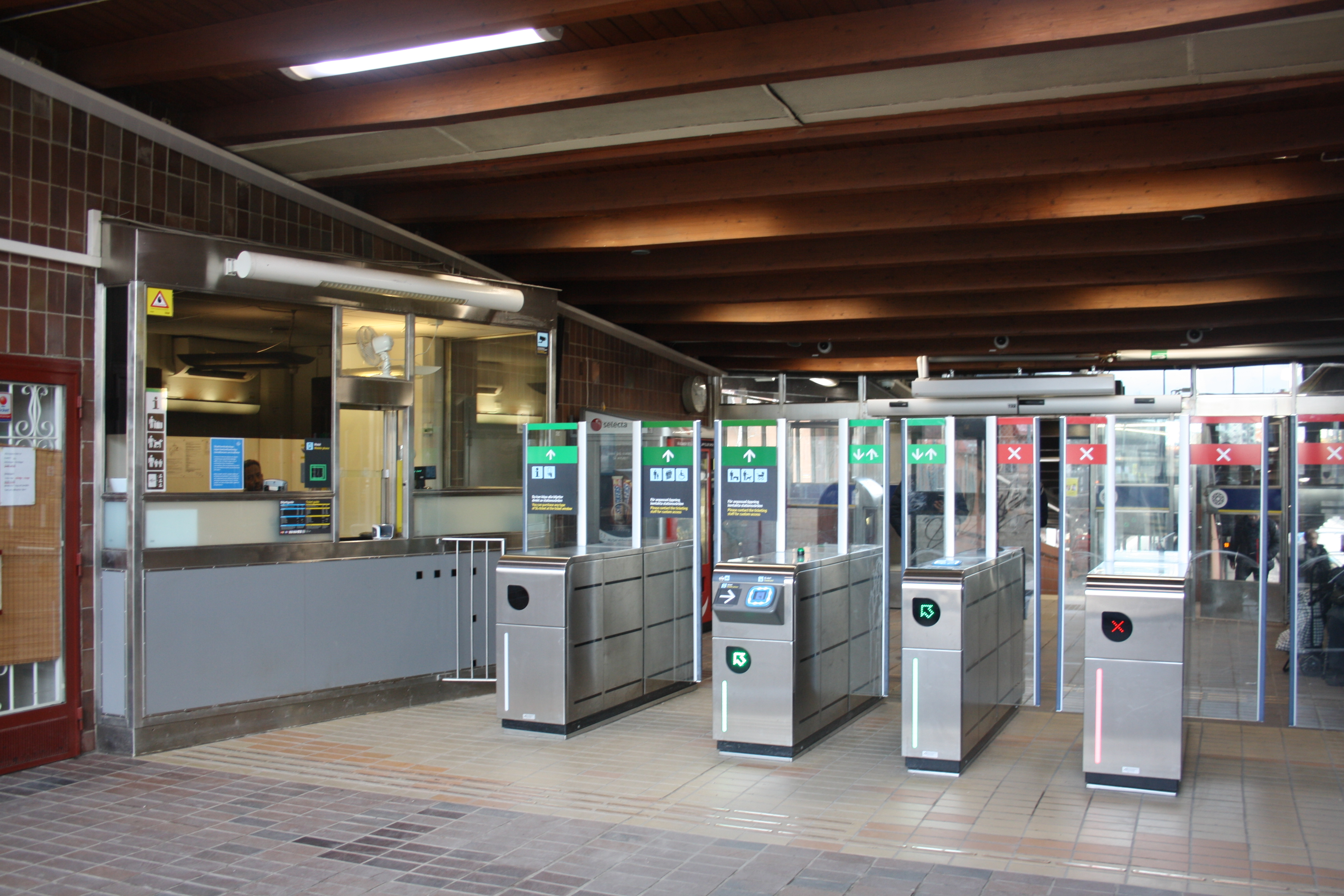
Ticket hall and barrier line

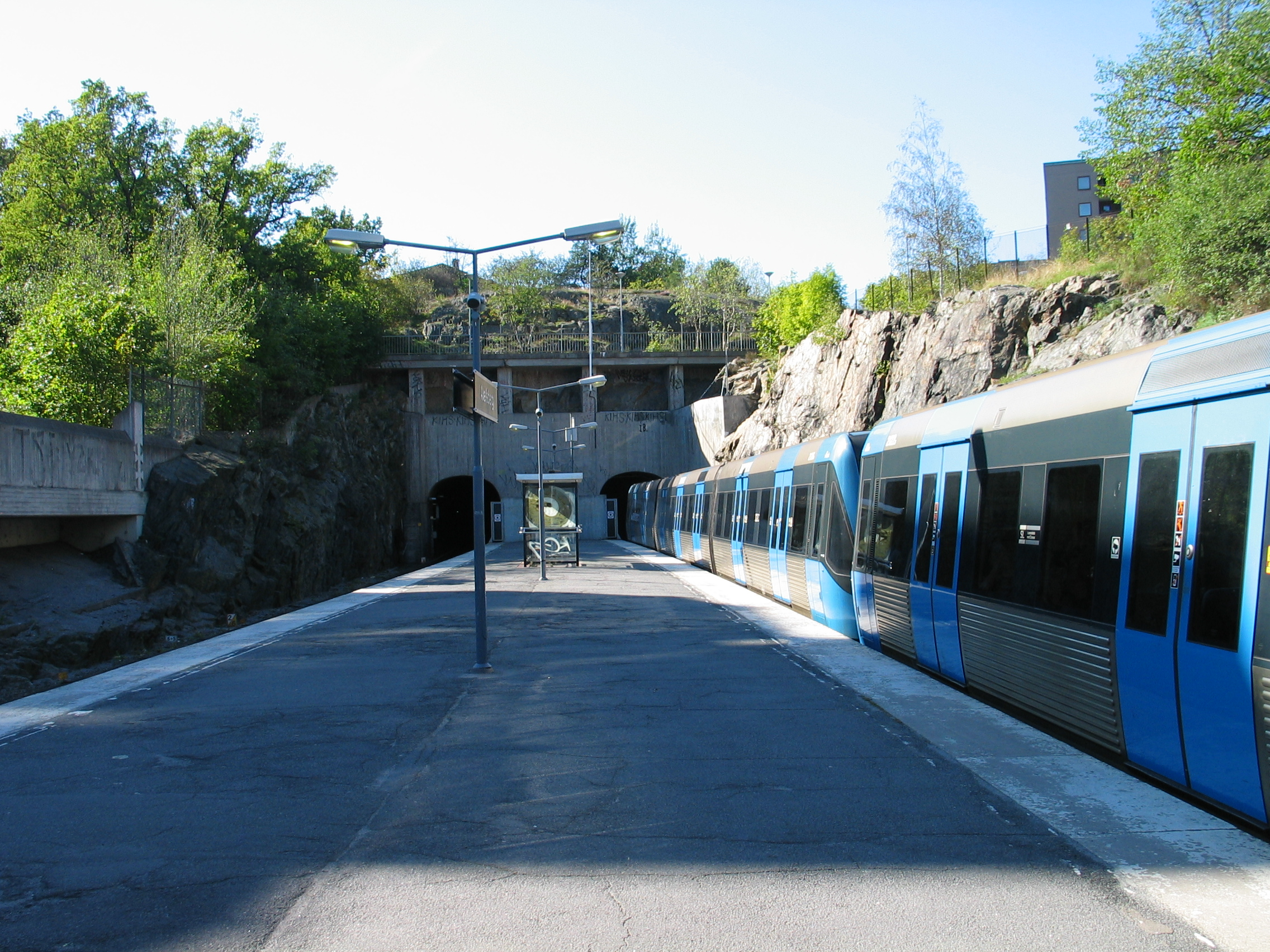
Plaform

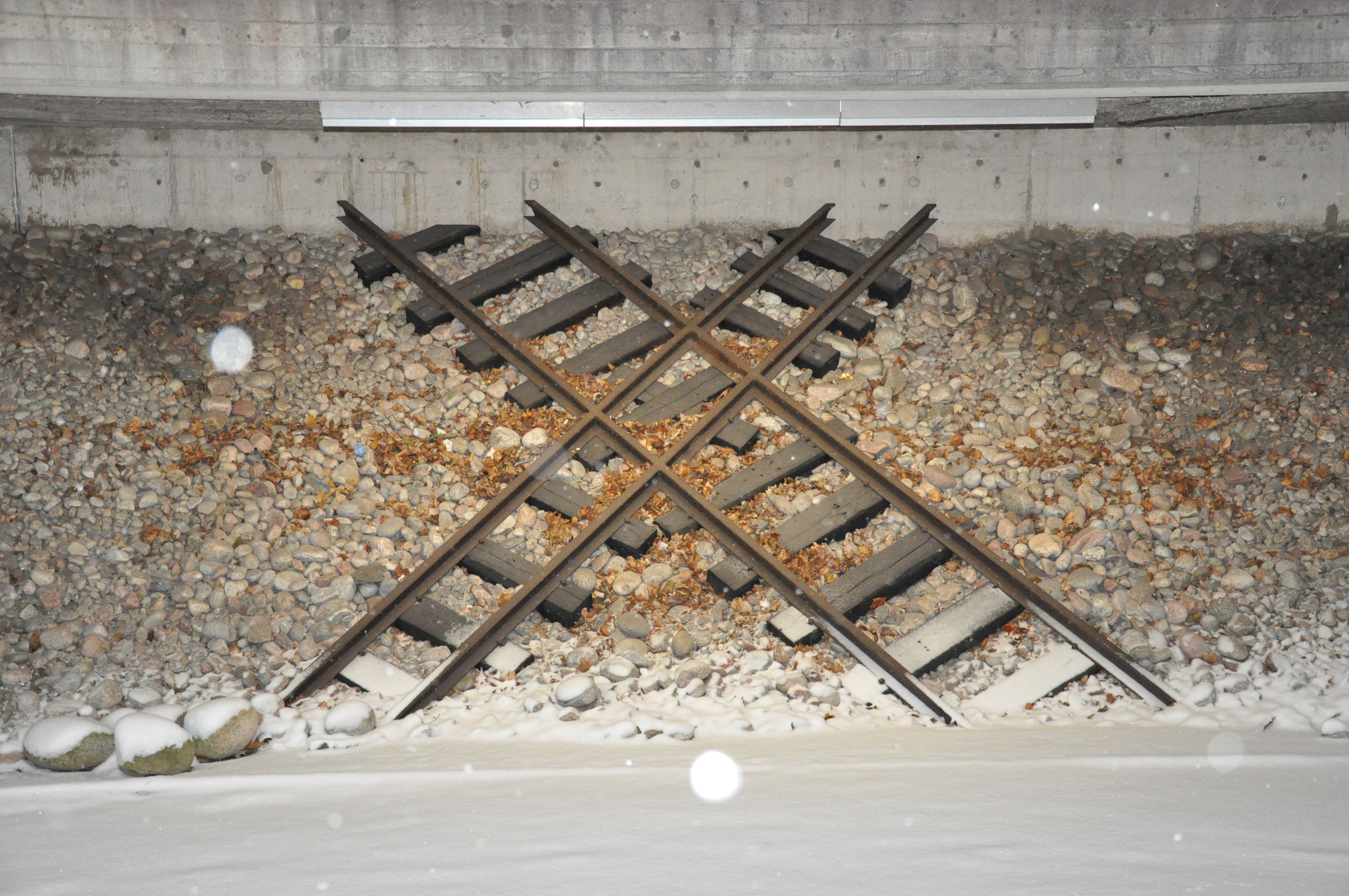
The X is depicted as a rail crossing
