= Sätra =

Urban district in Stockholm, Sweden

Coordinates: 59°17′07″N 17°55′14″E

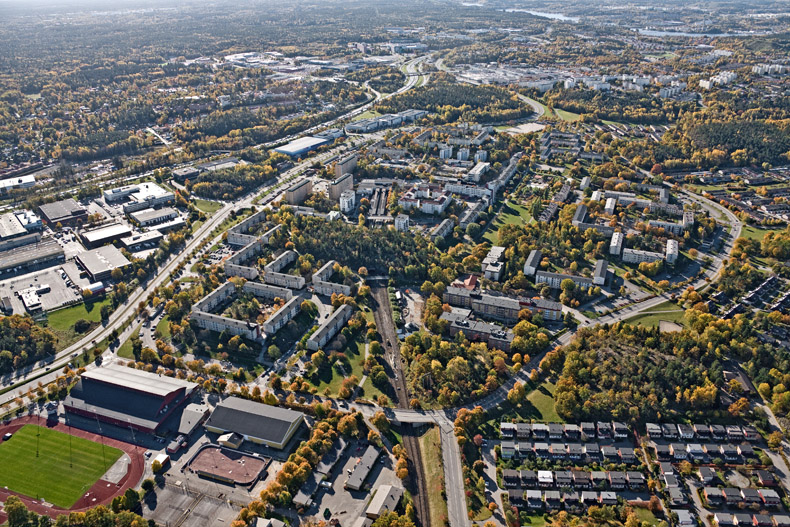
Aerial view of Sätra

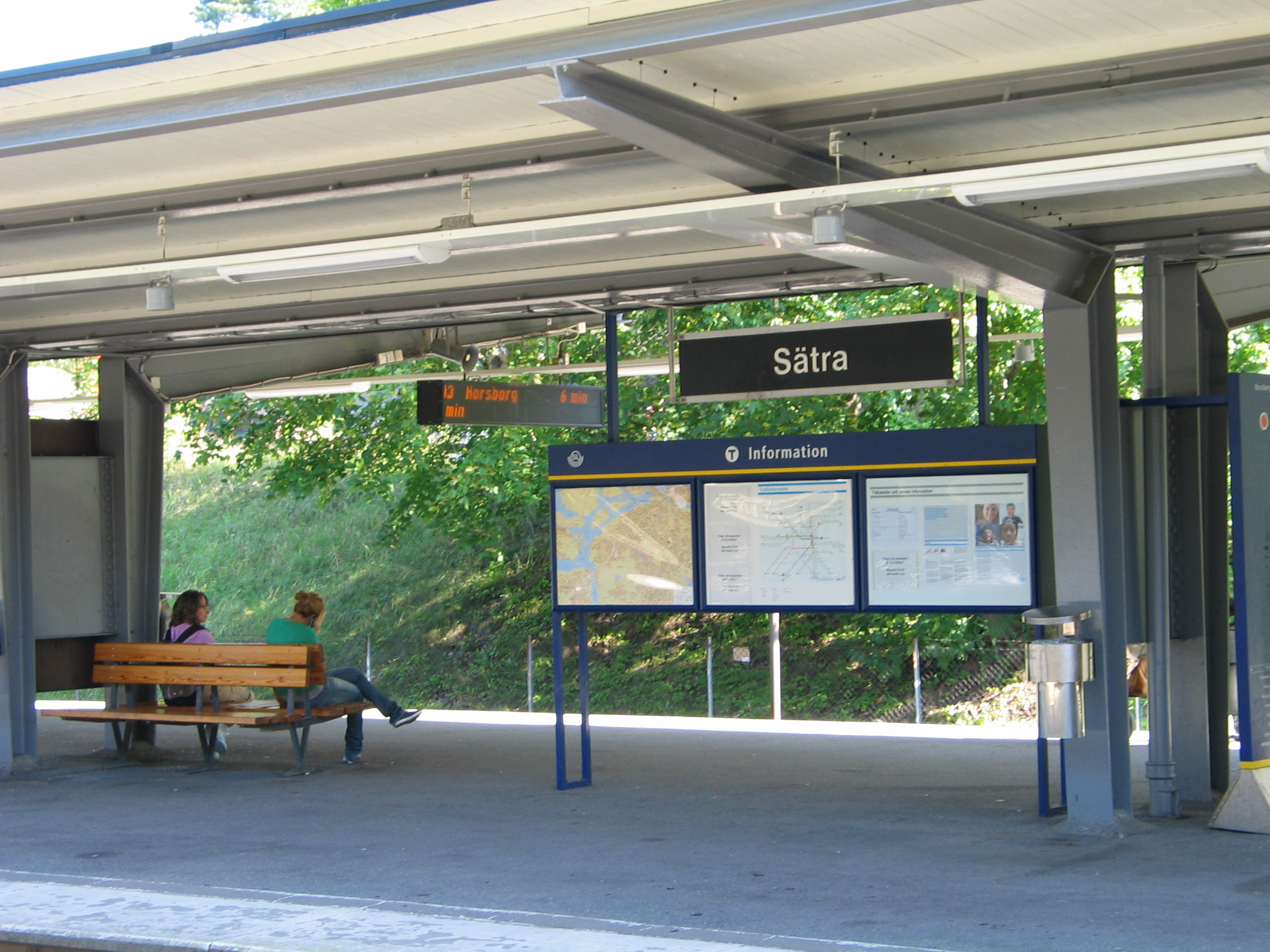
Sätra Metro Station

Sätra is a suburb in the district in Söderort in Stockholm, Sweden.

== Location ==
The district is bounded on the north by Lake Mälaren and on the south by Södertalje Road, a section of European route E4 and European route E20. Sätra borders the districts of Bredäng and Skärholmen, as well as Segeltorp in Huddinge municipality and Kungshatt in Ekerö municipality.

== History ==
The City of Stockholm bought the land in 1934 A.D. A new general plan for Sätra was drawn up the day after. Construction began in 1964 and four years later the entire district was almost completed. Together Sätra metro station and Sätra Centrum form the hub. Just South of the Sätra industrial buildings.

Sätra metro station is on the Red Line (Röda linjen) of the Stockholm Metro. The station was opened in 1965 as the southwest terminus of the extension from Örnsberg. In 1967, the line was extended to Skärholmen.
