= Axelsberg =

Coordinates: 59°18′15″N 17°58′31″E

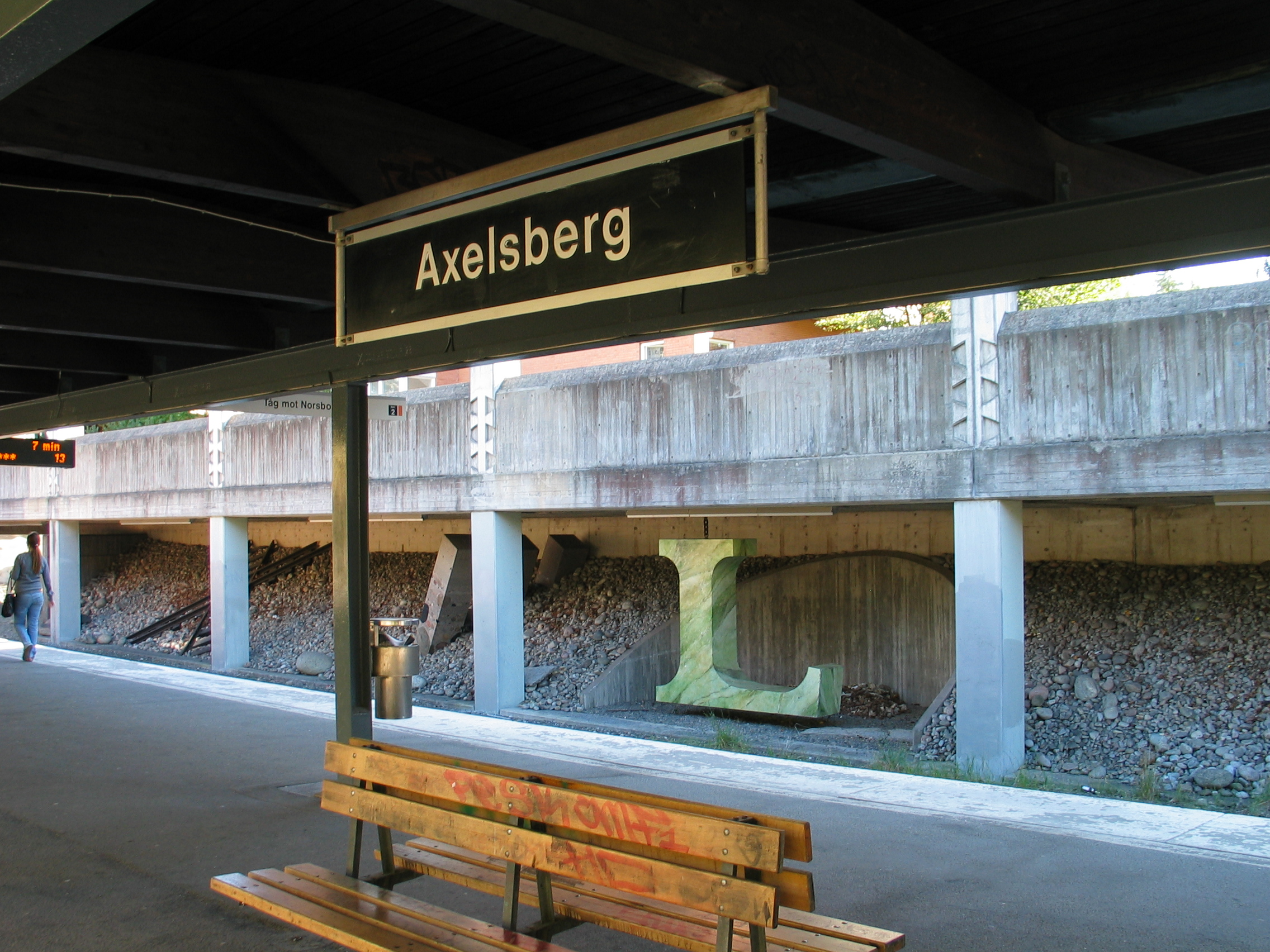
Subway station

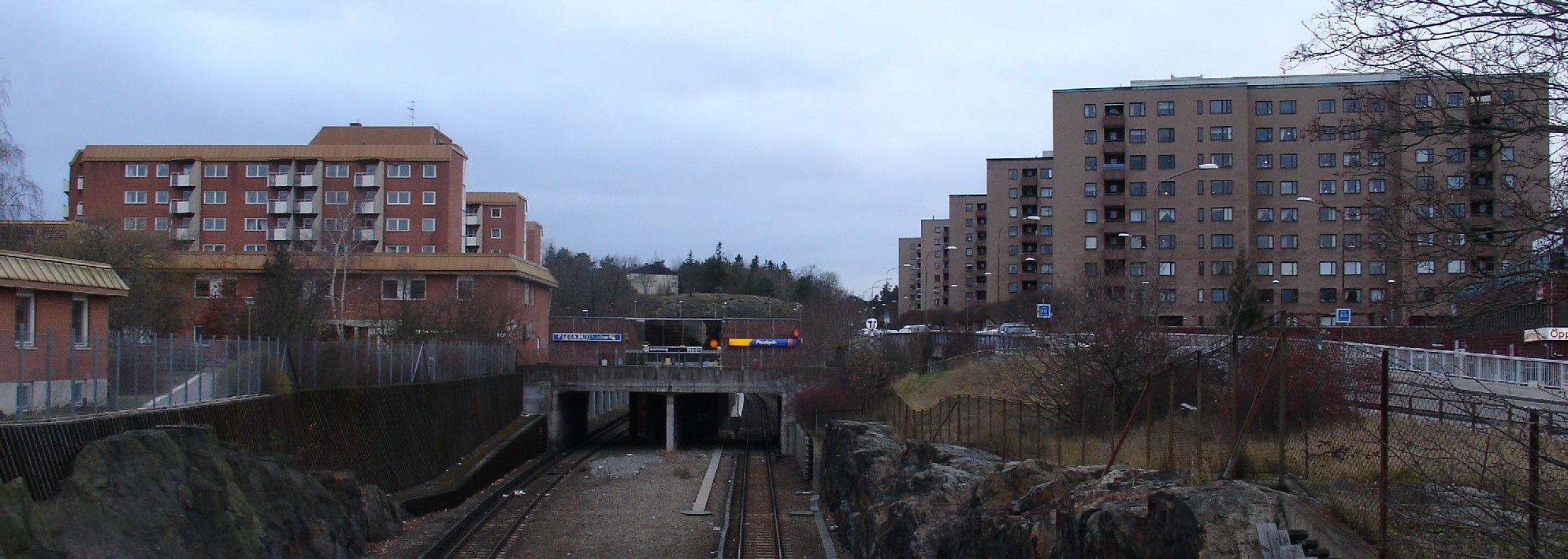
Axelsberg subway station and surroundings.

Axelsberg (lit. 'Axel's Hill') is a district of the Hägersten-Liljeholmen borough in Söderort, the southern suburban part of Stockholm. It is close to the Hägersten industrial area. The district's metro station was opened in 1965.
