= Bredäng =

District of Söderort, Stockholm, Sweden

Coordinates: 59°17′41″N 17°55′57″E

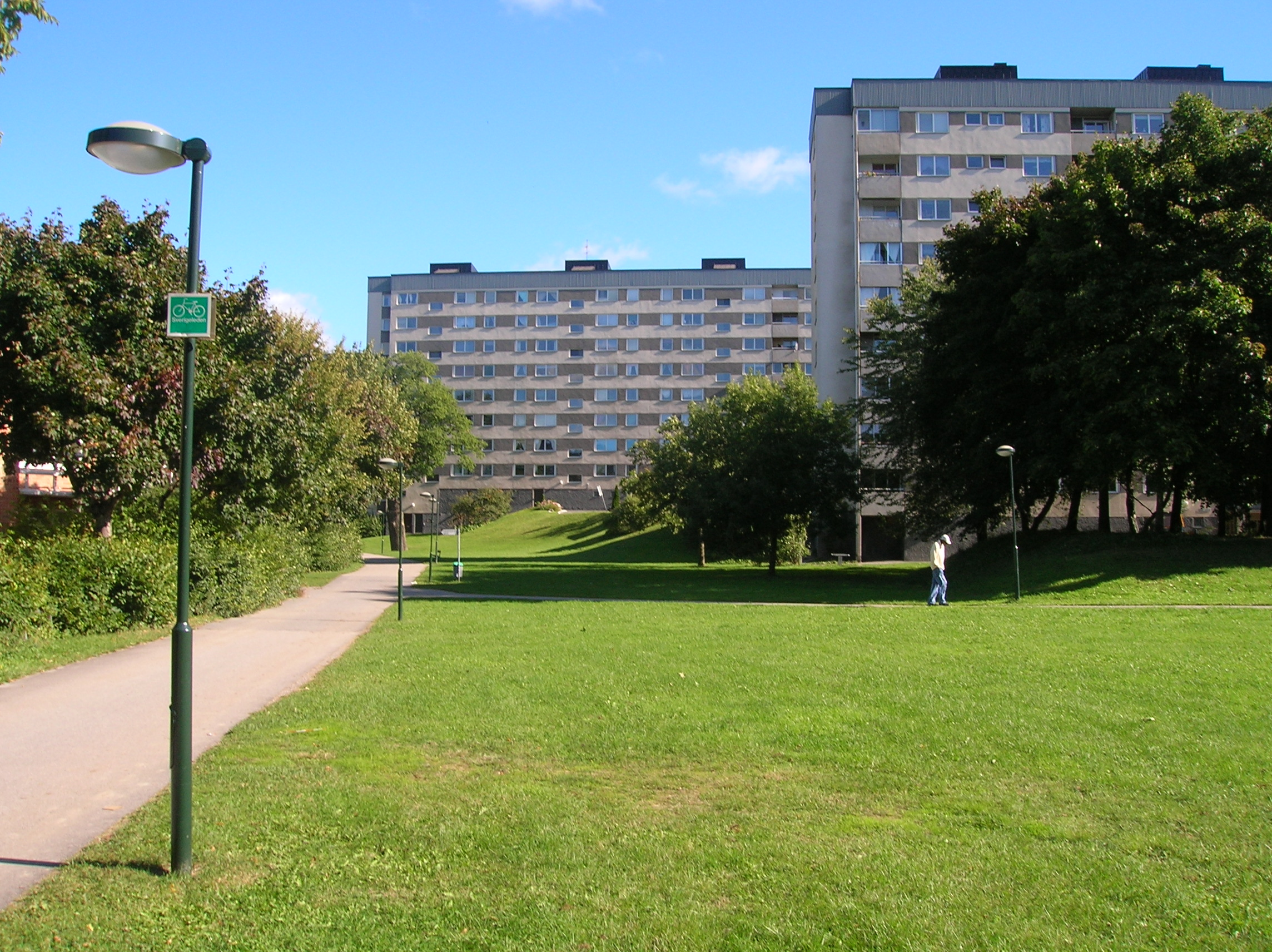
Park in Bredäng. Houses built in 1964 and designed by Carl-Evin Sandberg.

Bredäng (lit. 'Broad Meadow') is a district of Skärholmen, Stockholm, Sweden in the Söderort section of the city. It is named after a former farm in the area. Bredäng has an 18th-century mansion (Jakobsbergs gård) named after its first owner, Jacob Graver. Bredäng consists predominantly of 1960s apartment blocks and has a camping site by the lake Mälaren.

As of 2024, the population of Bredäng is 10,638. 63.2% of the population had a foreign background.

== See also ==
- Bredäng metro station
