= Sätra metro station =

Stockholm Metro station

Sätra
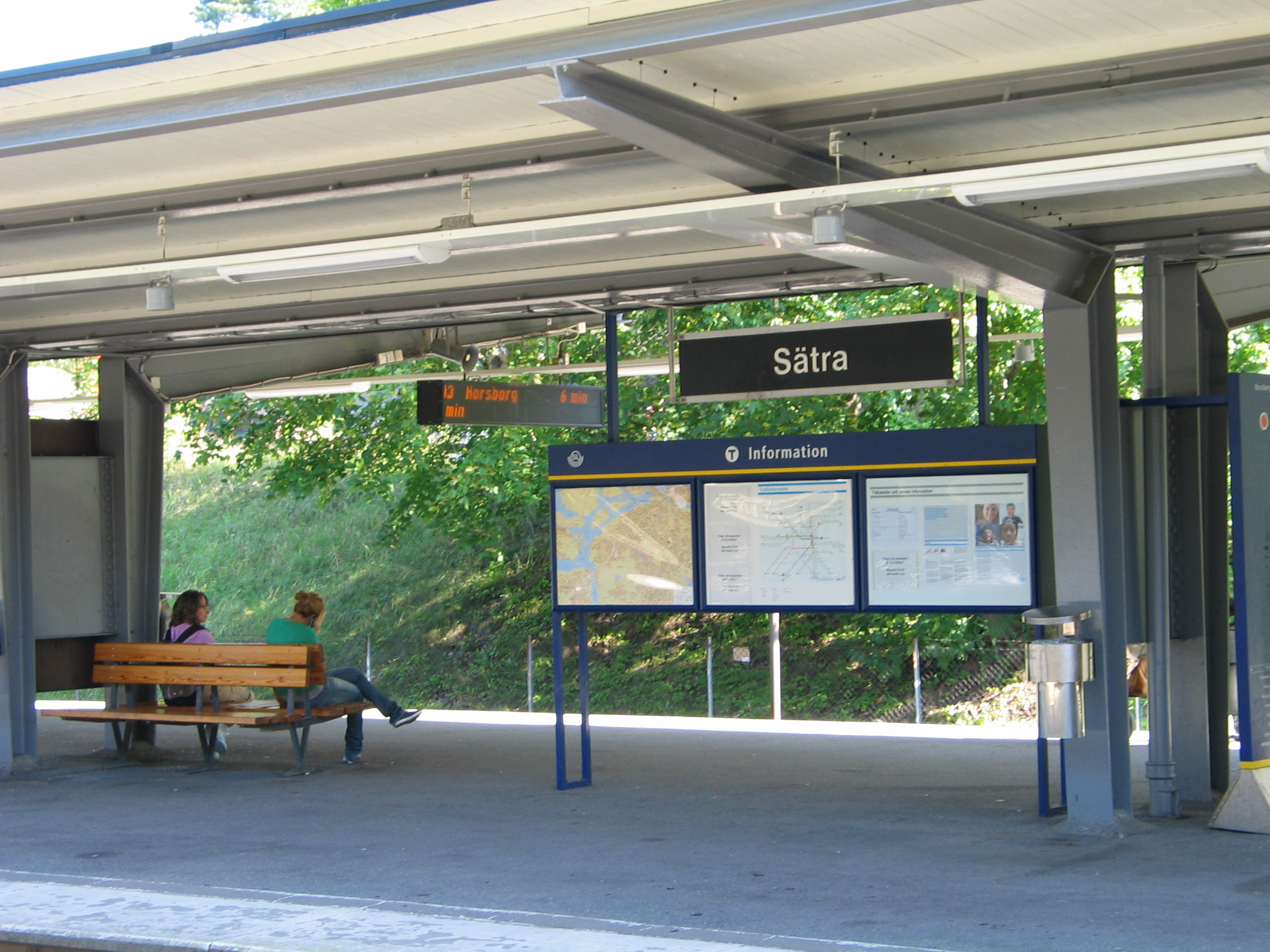

General information
- Coordinates: 59°17′7″N 17°55′14″E
- Elevation: 36.3 m (119 ft) above sea level
- System: Stockholm Metro station
- Owner: Storstockholms Lokaltrafik
- Platforms: 2 island platforms
- Tracks: 3

Construction
- Structure type: At grade
- Accessible: Yes

Other information
- Station code: SÄT

History
- Opened: 16 May 1965; 61 years ago

Passengers
- 2019: 5,550 boarding per weekday

Services
| Preceding station | Stockholm Metro | Following station |
|---|---|---|
| Skärholmen towards Norsborg | Line 13 | Bredäng towards Ropsten |
Location
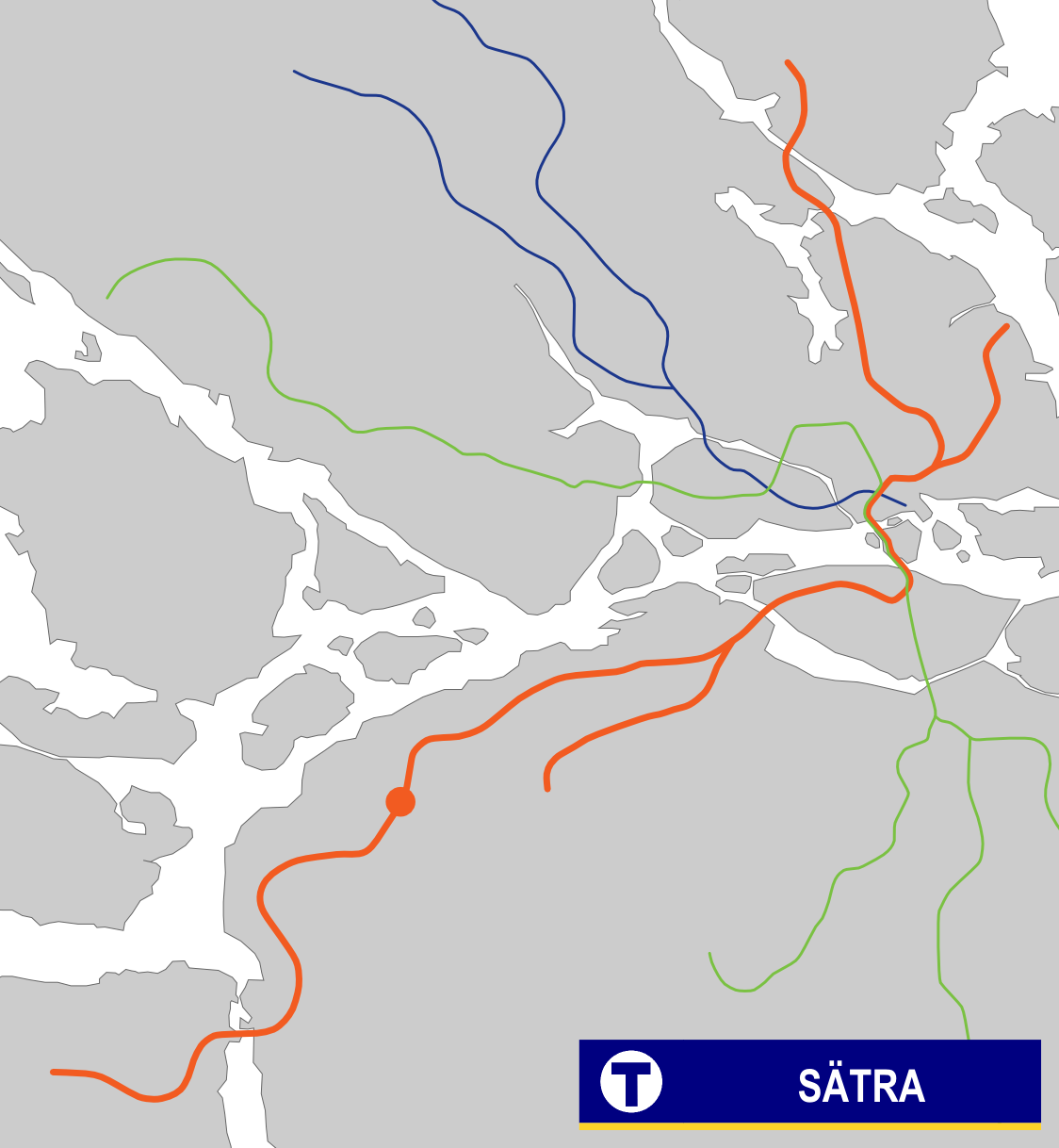

Sätra is a station on Line 13 of the Red Line of Stockholm Metro, located in Sätra, Stockholm City, Sweden. The station opened on 16 May 1965 as the southwest terminus of the extension from Örnsberg. On 1 March 1967, the line was extended further southwest to Skärholmen. The station is 10.3 km (6.4 mi) from Slussen.

The station is situated in an open cutting just below street level, and has three tracks and two island platforms. The outer tracks are used by through trains, whilst the centre track is used for terminating trains. Trains enter the station at both ends from tunnels, with the tunnel mouths adjacent to the platform ends.

There is a single ticket hall, above the tracks at the southern end of the platforms. Access to the platforms is via ramps, stairs and lifts. The station is integrated with the Sätra Centrum shopping centre, and together they form the hub of the Sätra district.

The station's walls feature a ceramic work by Päivi Ernkvist entitled Tusen och en natt (Swedish for One Thousand and One Nights), dating from 1994. This has tiles in varying shades of blue, broken up by handmade red tiles.

== Gallery ==
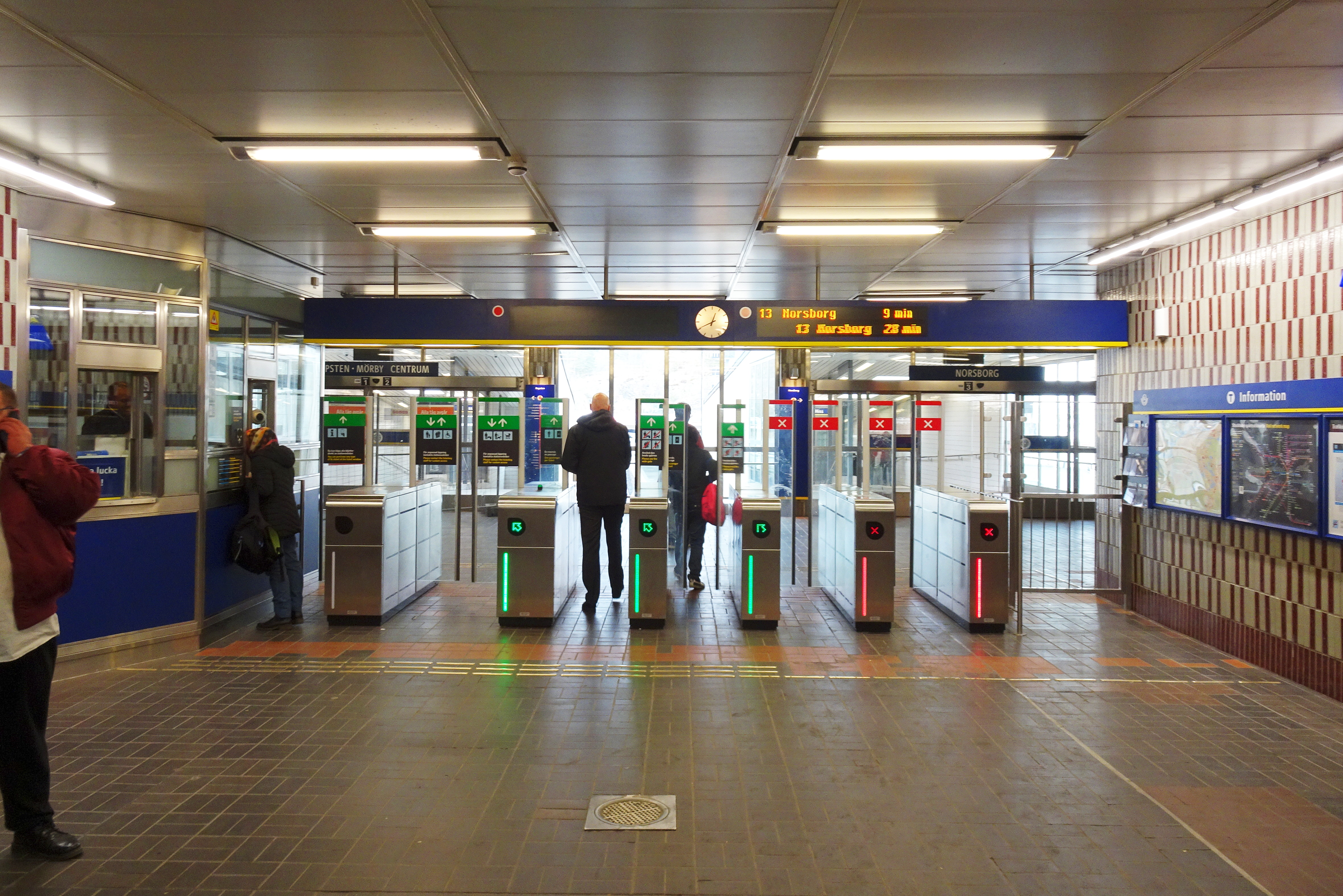
Station entrance seen from shopping centre

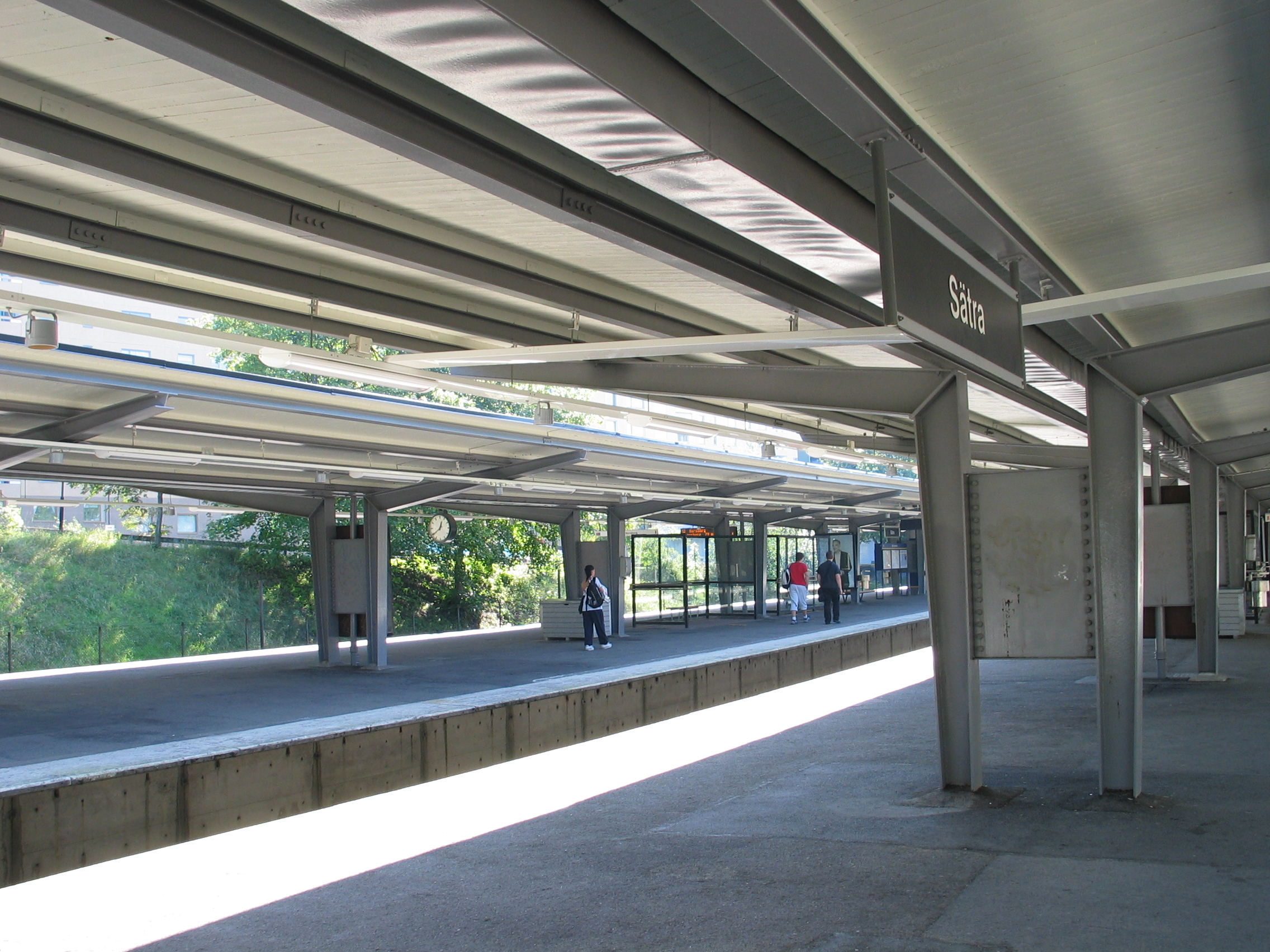
Plafforms

Tunnel entrances

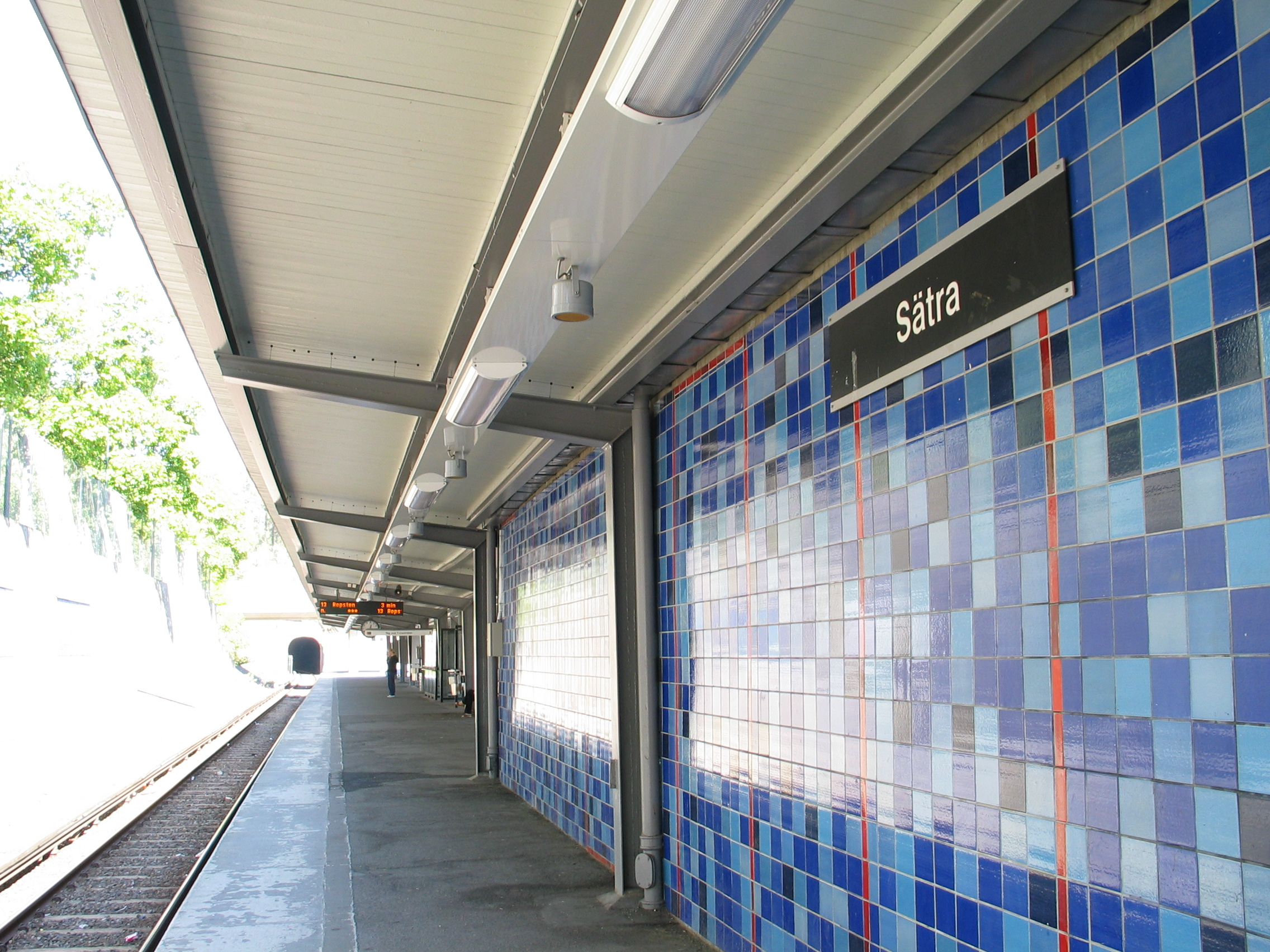
Art work One Thousand and One Nights
