= Örnsberg metro station =

Stockholm Metro station

Örnsberg
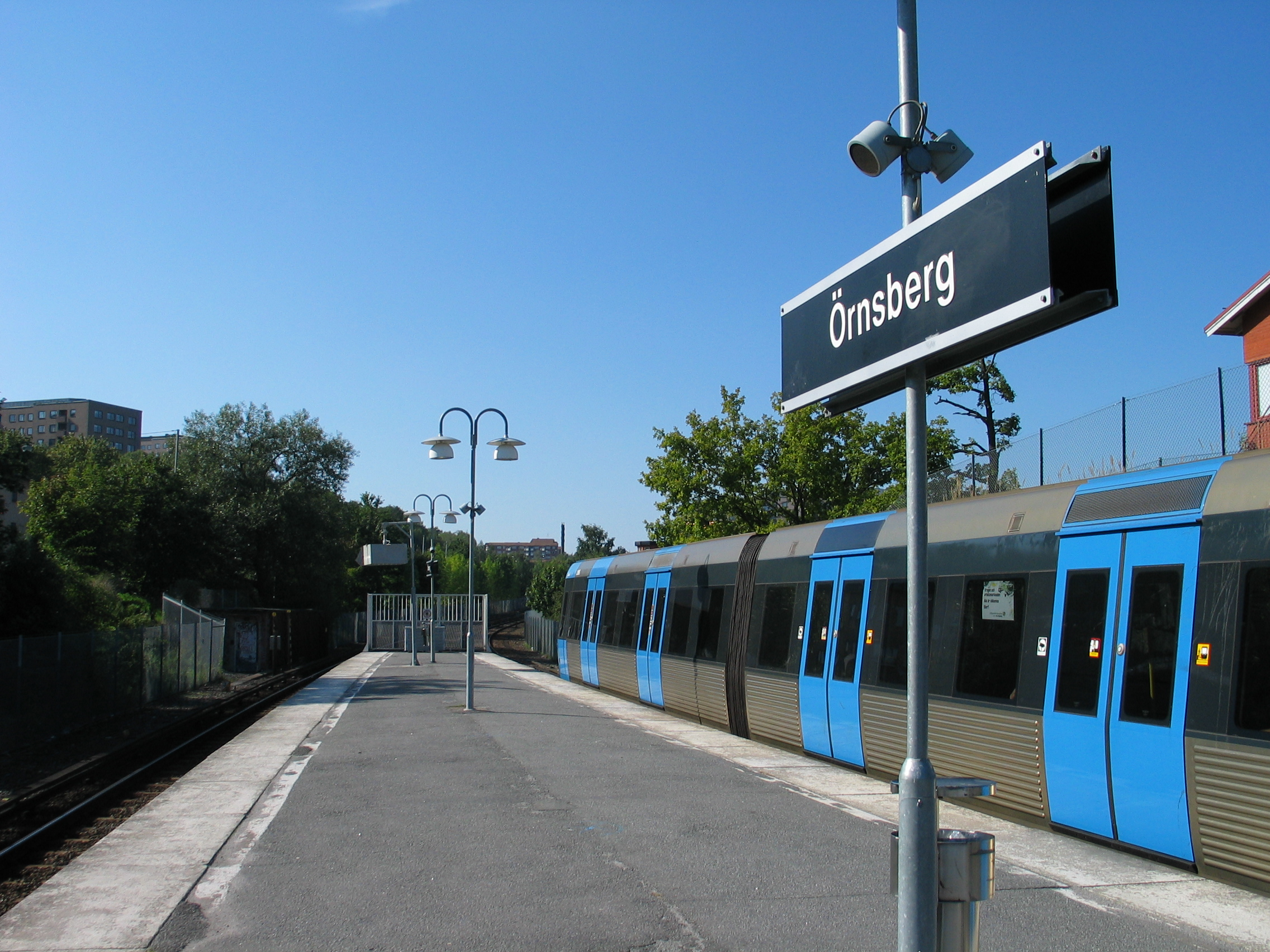

General information
- Coordinates: 59°18′20″N 17°59′19″E
- Elevation: 9.1 m (30 ft) above sea level
- System: Stockholm Metro station
- Owner: Storstockholms Lokaltrafik
- Platforms: 1 island platform
- Tracks: 2

Construction
- Structure type: At grade
- Accessible: Yes

Other information
- Station code: ÖBG

History
- Opened: 5 April 1964; 62 years ago

Passengers
- 2019: 4,550 boarding per weekday

Services
Preceding station	Stockholm Metro	Following station
Axelsberg towards Norsborg	Line 13	Aspudden towards Ropsten
Location
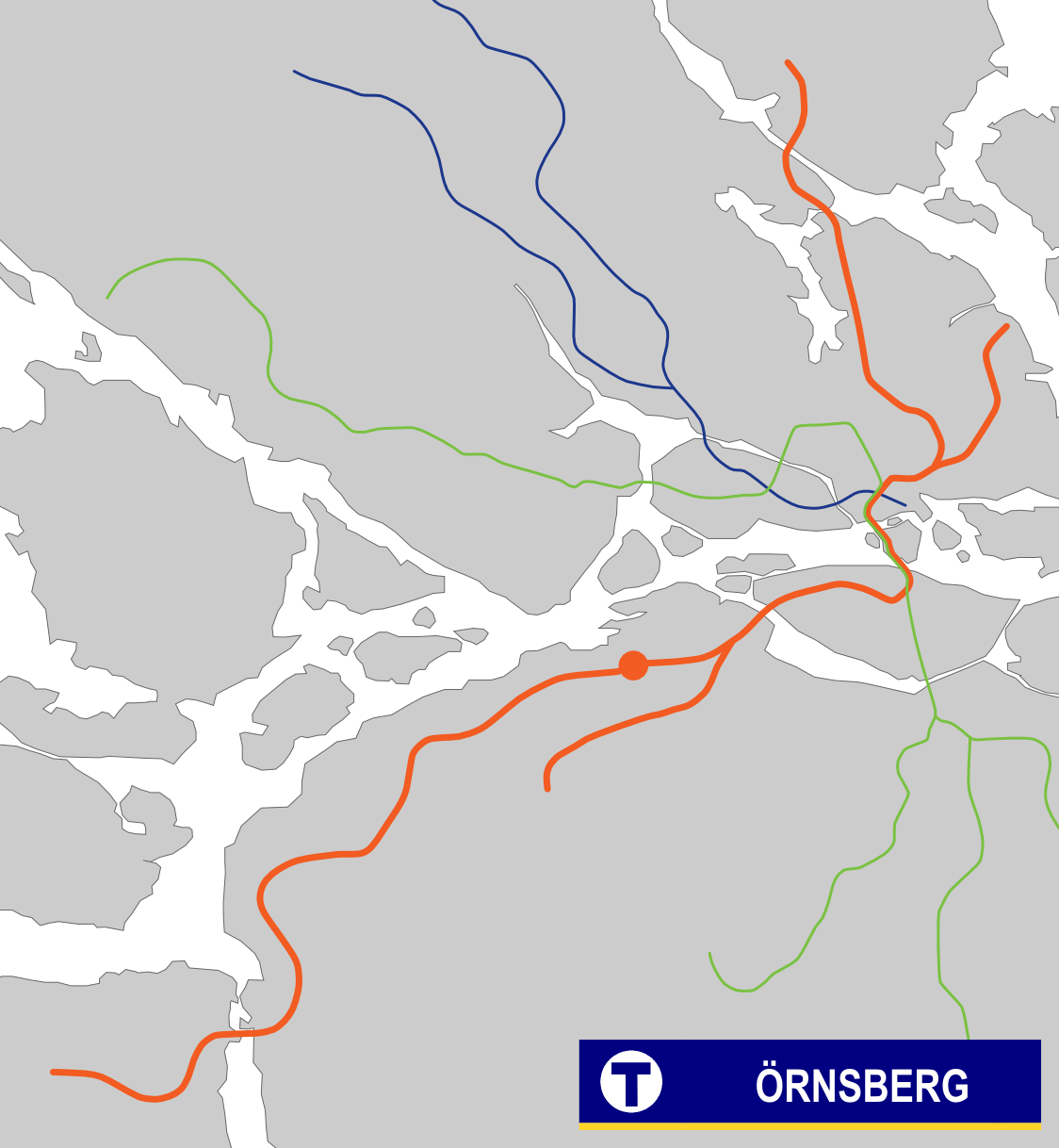

Örnsberg is a station on Line 13 of the Red Line of the Stockholm Metro, located between Aspudden and Hägersten in Stockholm City, Sweden. The station opened on 5 April 1964 as the southwest terminus of the first section of the Red line, from T-Centralen to Örnsberg. On 16 May 1965, the line was extended further southwest to Sätra.

The station is situated partly in tunnel, but mostly in an open cutting just below street level, and has two tracks and a single island platform. There is a single ticket hall, above the tracks at the eastern (in tunnel) end of the platforms and accessed directly from the street. Access to the platforms is via stairs, escalator and lift.

Örnsberg is one of the few Stockholm Metro stations that does not feature any works of art.

== Gallery ==
Station from above

Station entrance

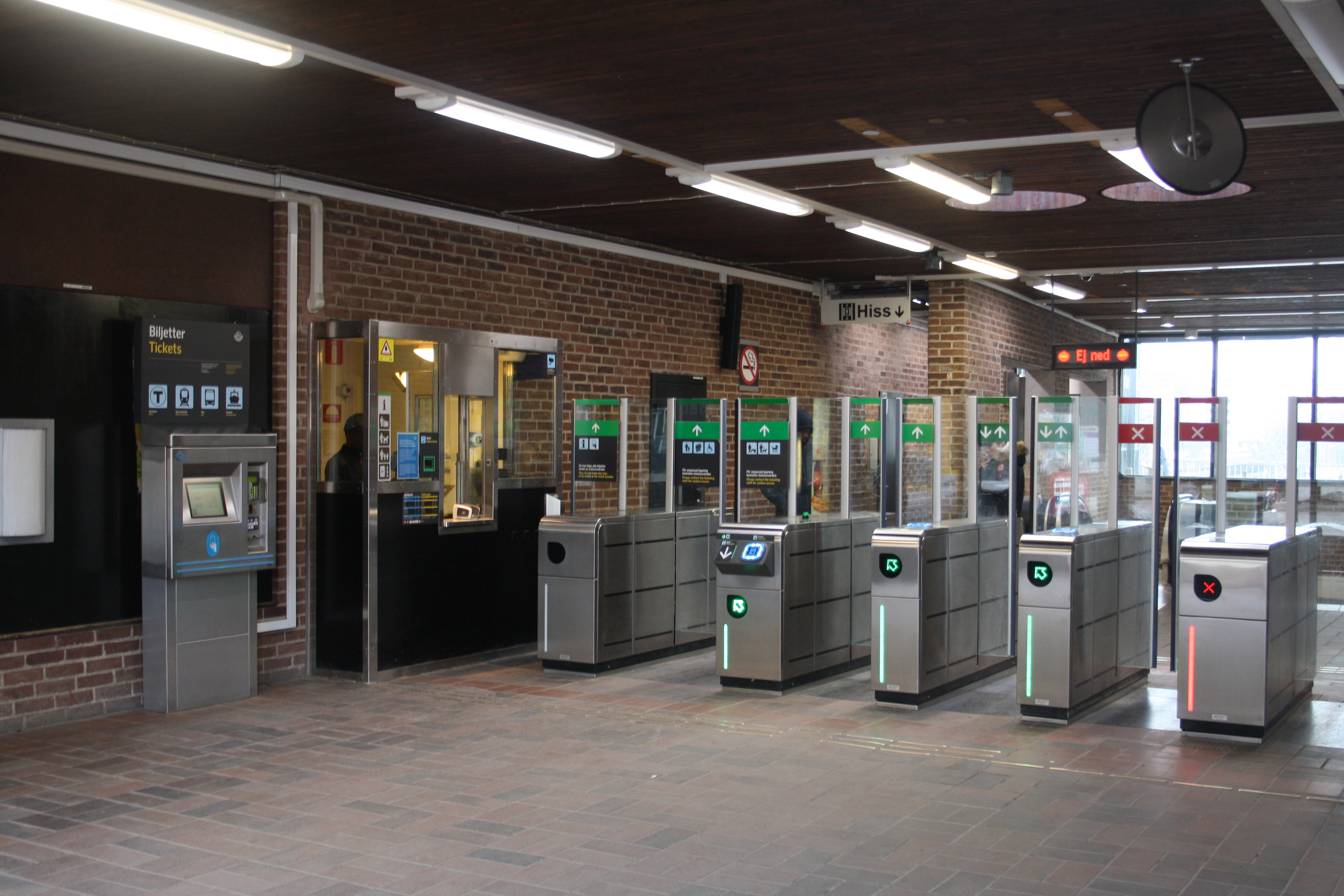
Ticket hall and barrier line

Stairs, escalator and lift
