= Stockholm City =

Stockholm City may refer to:

- Stockholm, the capital and largest city of Sweden
- City (Stockholm) (Swedish: Stockholms city), a central area of Stockholm
- Stockholm City railway station, a commuter rail station in central Stockholm
- Stockholm Municipality (Swedish: 'Stockholms kommun' or 'Stockholms stad', lit. 'Stockholm City'), the municipality covering Stockholm
