= Alby metro station =

Stockholm Metro station

Alby
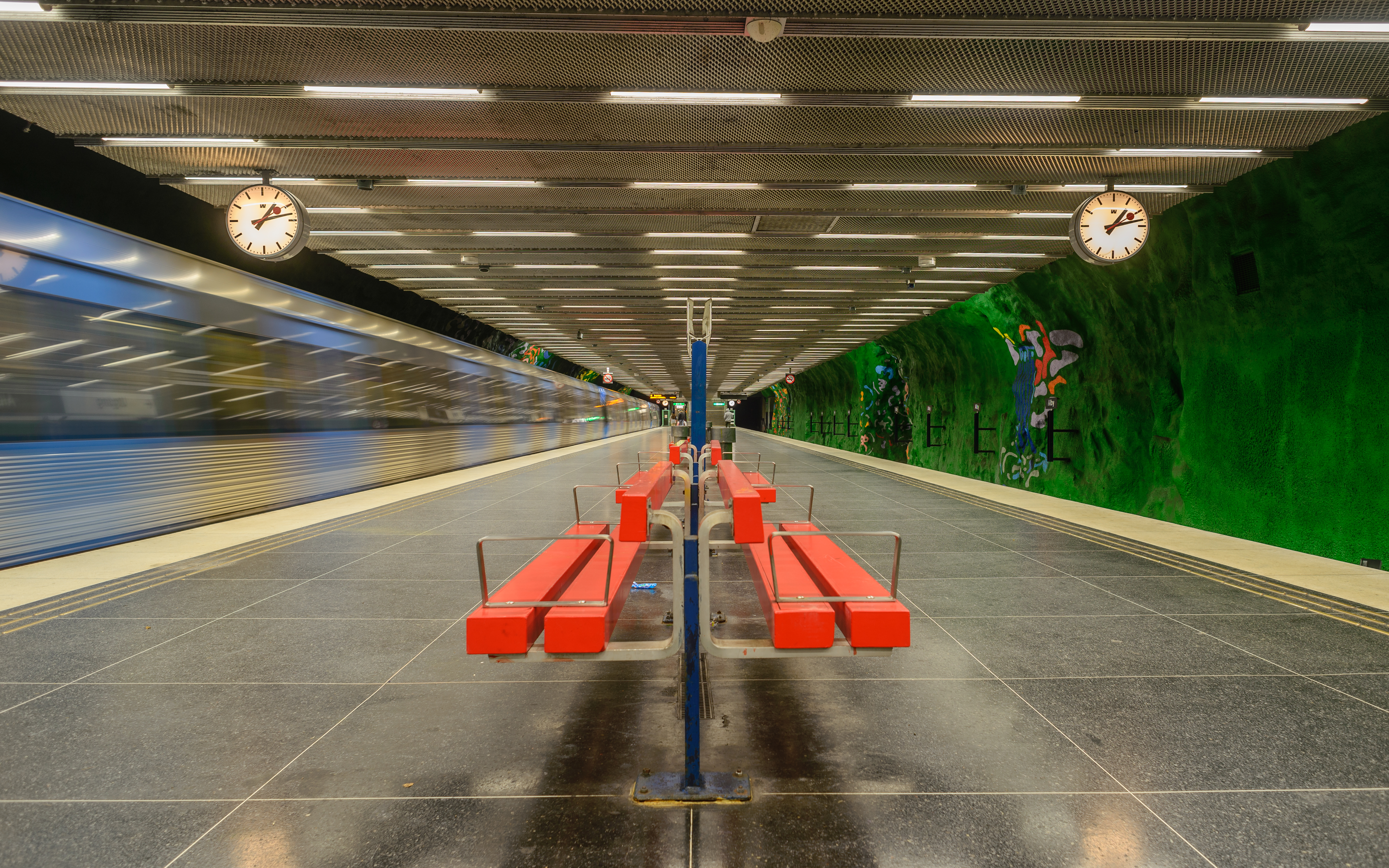
- Station platforms, September 2014

General information
- Coordinates: 59°14′22″N 17°50′44″E
- Elevation: 17.8 m (58 ft) above sea level
- System: Stockholm Metro station
- Owner: Storstockholms Lokaltrafik
- Platforms: 1 island platform and 1 side platform
- Tracks: 3

Construction
- Structure type: Underground
- Depth: 24 m (79 ft)
- Platform levels: 1
- Accessible: Yes

Other information
- Station code: ALB

History
- Opened: 12 January 1975; 51 years ago

Passengers
- 2019: 6,550 boarding per weekday

Services
Preceding station	Stockholm Metro	Following station
Hallunda towards Norsborg	Line 13	Fittja towards Ropsten
Location
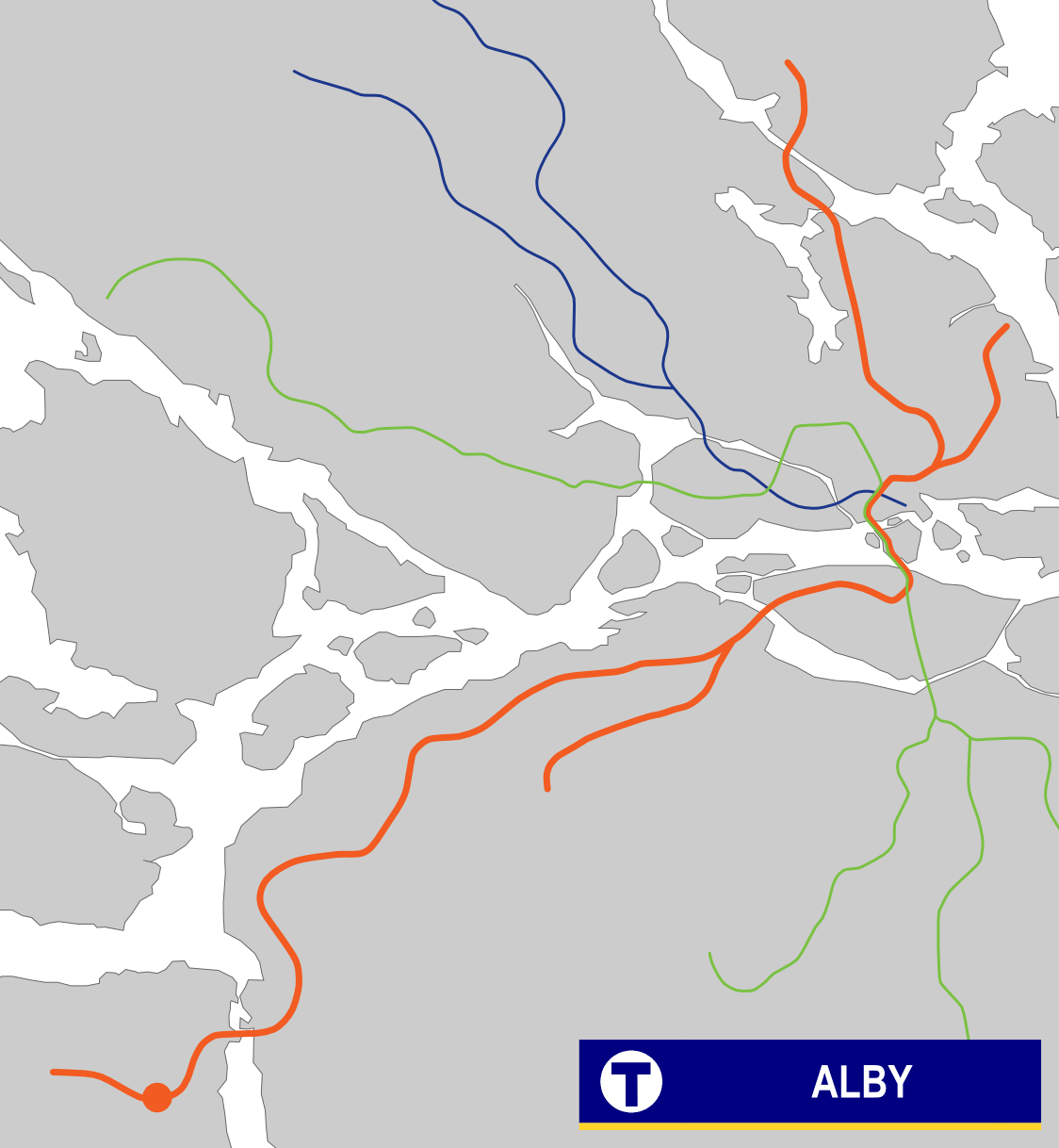

Alby is a station on Line 13 of the Red Line of the Stockholm Metro, located in Alby, Botkyrka Municipality, Sweden. The station opened on 12 January 1975 as part of the extension from Fittja to Norsborg. The distance from Slussen is 19 kilometres (12 mi).

The station is situated below ground, with its platforms some 24 metres (79 ft) below the highest point above. There are three tracks, with an island platform used by trains towards Slussen, and a side platform used by trains towards Norsborg. There are entrances from the centre of Alby and, via a long escalator, from Lagmansbacken. Both entrances give access to a ticket office and barrier line one level above the platforms.

Between 1972 and 1974, before the station opened, it was painted by Olle Ängkvist in a moss green base tone with large flowers, labyrinths, signs and symbols in intense colors such as red, yellow, blue and pink. Some of the paintings are in the style of prehistoric cave paintings.

== Gallery ==
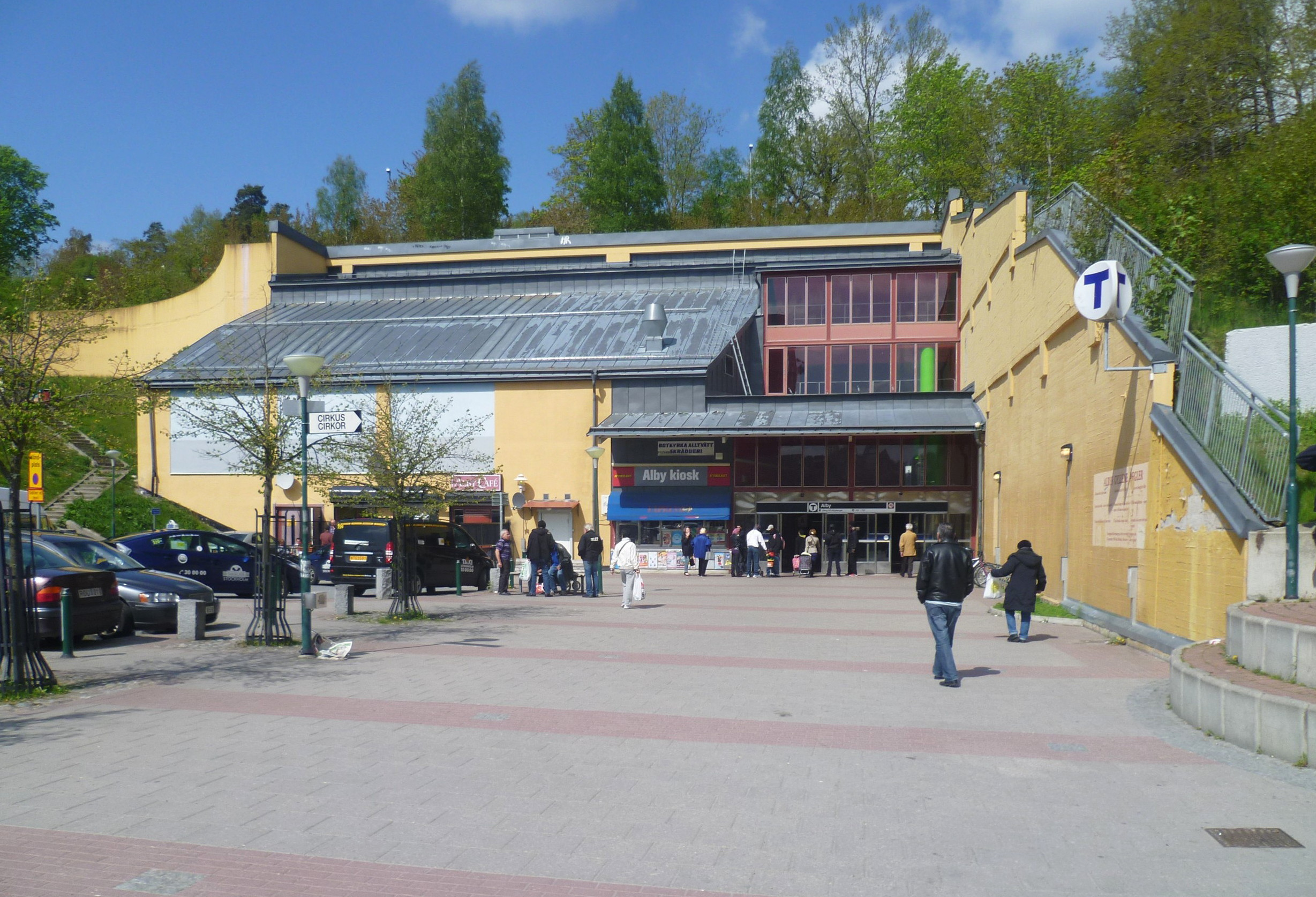
Entrance from Alby center

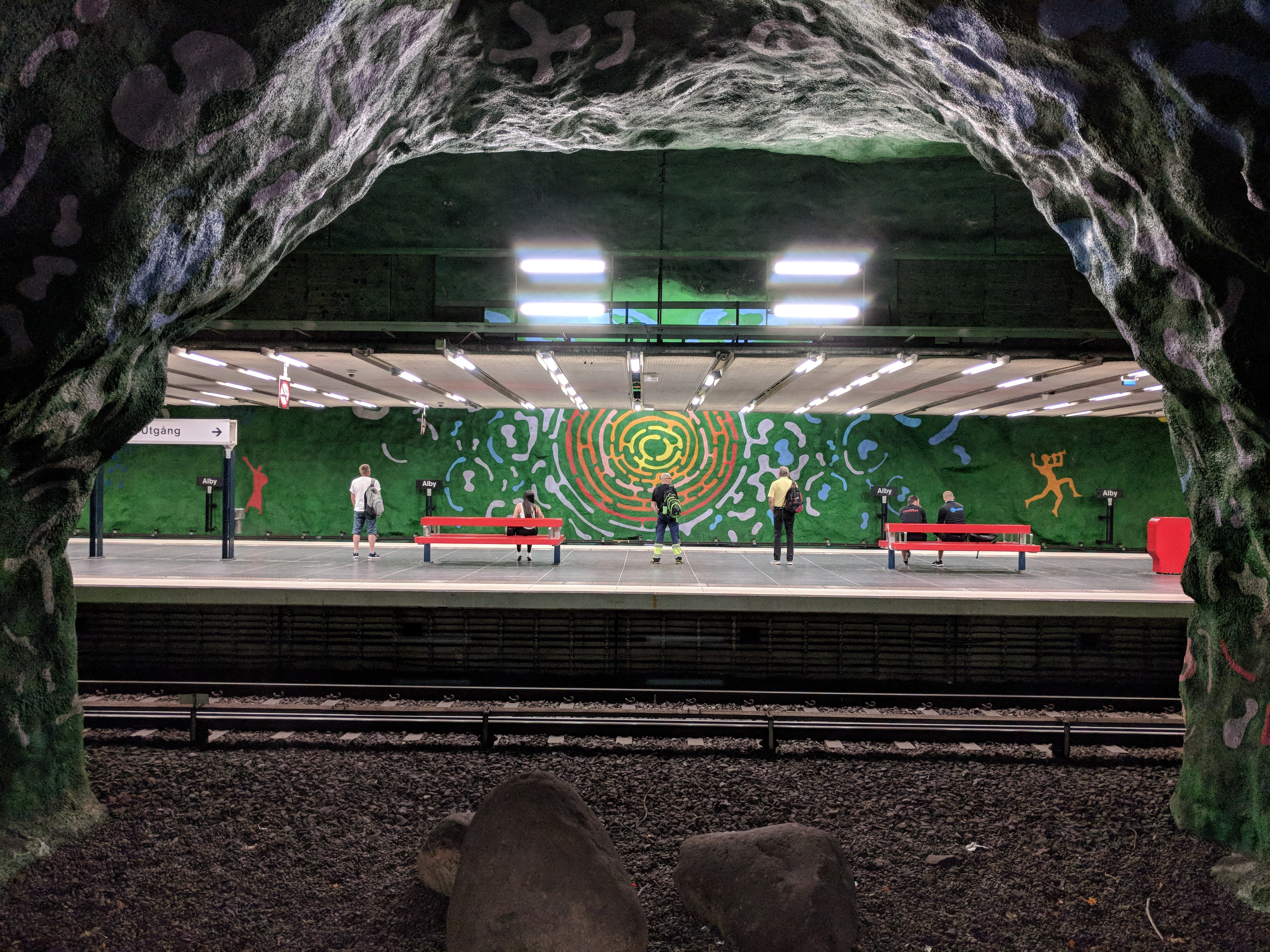
View between platforms with art work

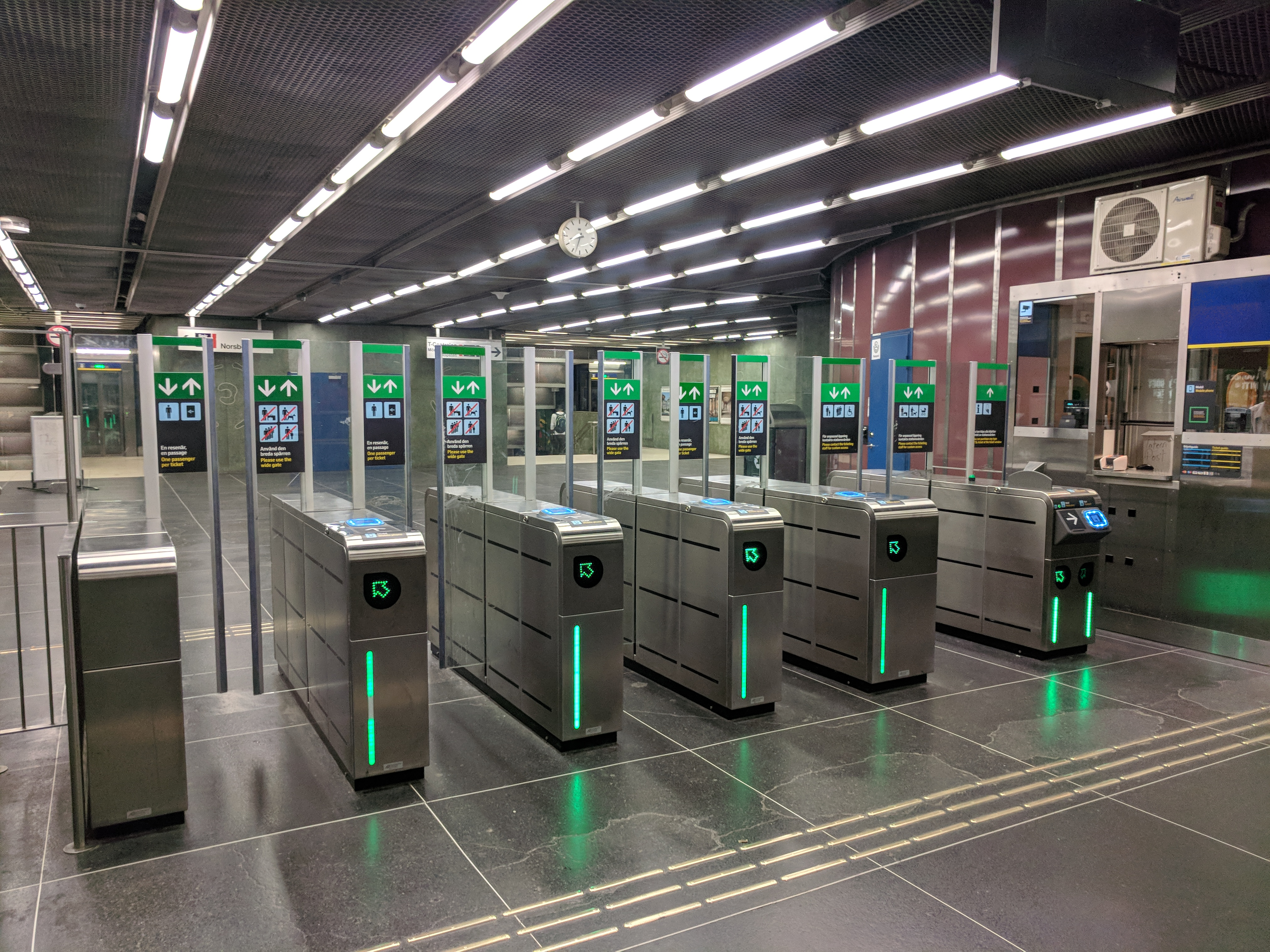
Ticket barriers

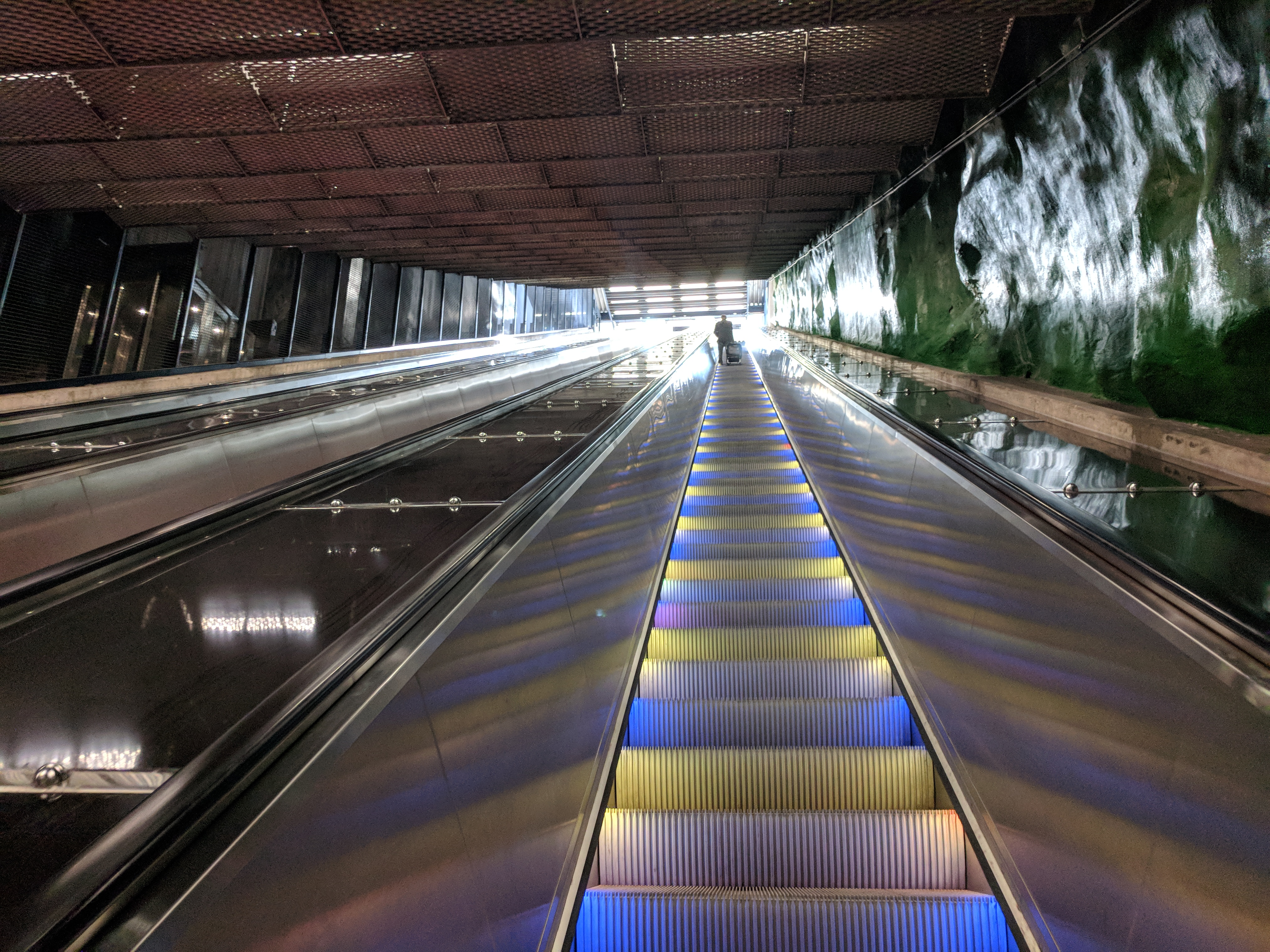
Escalators from Lagmansbacken
