= Raha Rastifard =

Iranian-German artist

Raha Rastifard, born February 1, 1974, in Iran, is an Iranian-German contemporary visual artist living in Stockholm, Sweden.

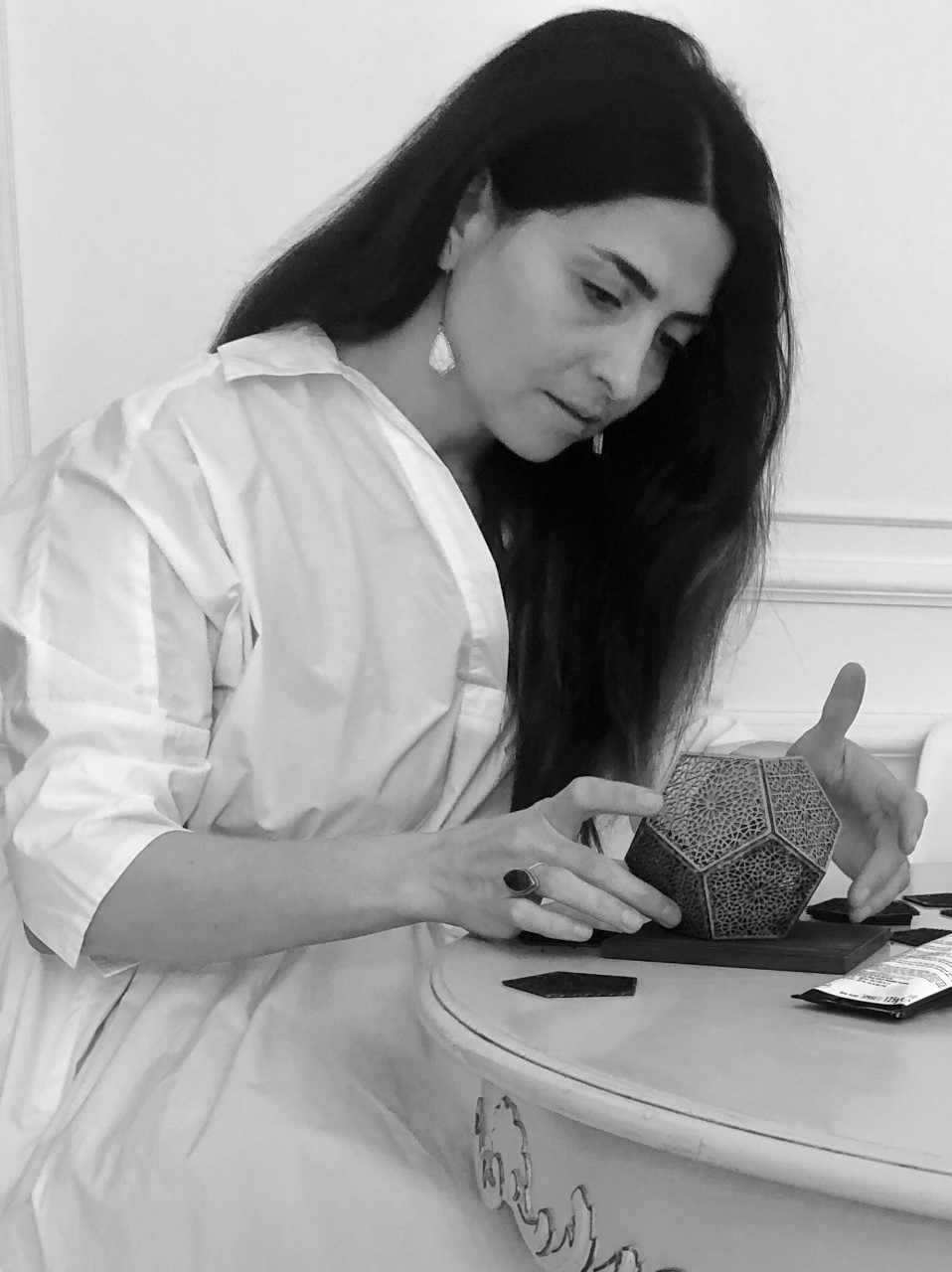
Raha Rastifard, 2019

== Biography ==
Raha Rastifard is an Iranian-German conceptual artist living in Stockholm. Rastifard works in various disciplines, from painting to video art, photography, drawings, installations, sculptures and public art.

Rastifard has exhibited in several European cities, including the Victoria and Albert Museum in London in connection with her nomination for the Freedom to Create Prize and the Pergamon Museum in Berlin. Rastifard has also exhibited in New York, Tokyo, Delhi and Shanghai. The Borås Konstmuseum installed a permanent exhibit of her work in 2022.

== Public art ==
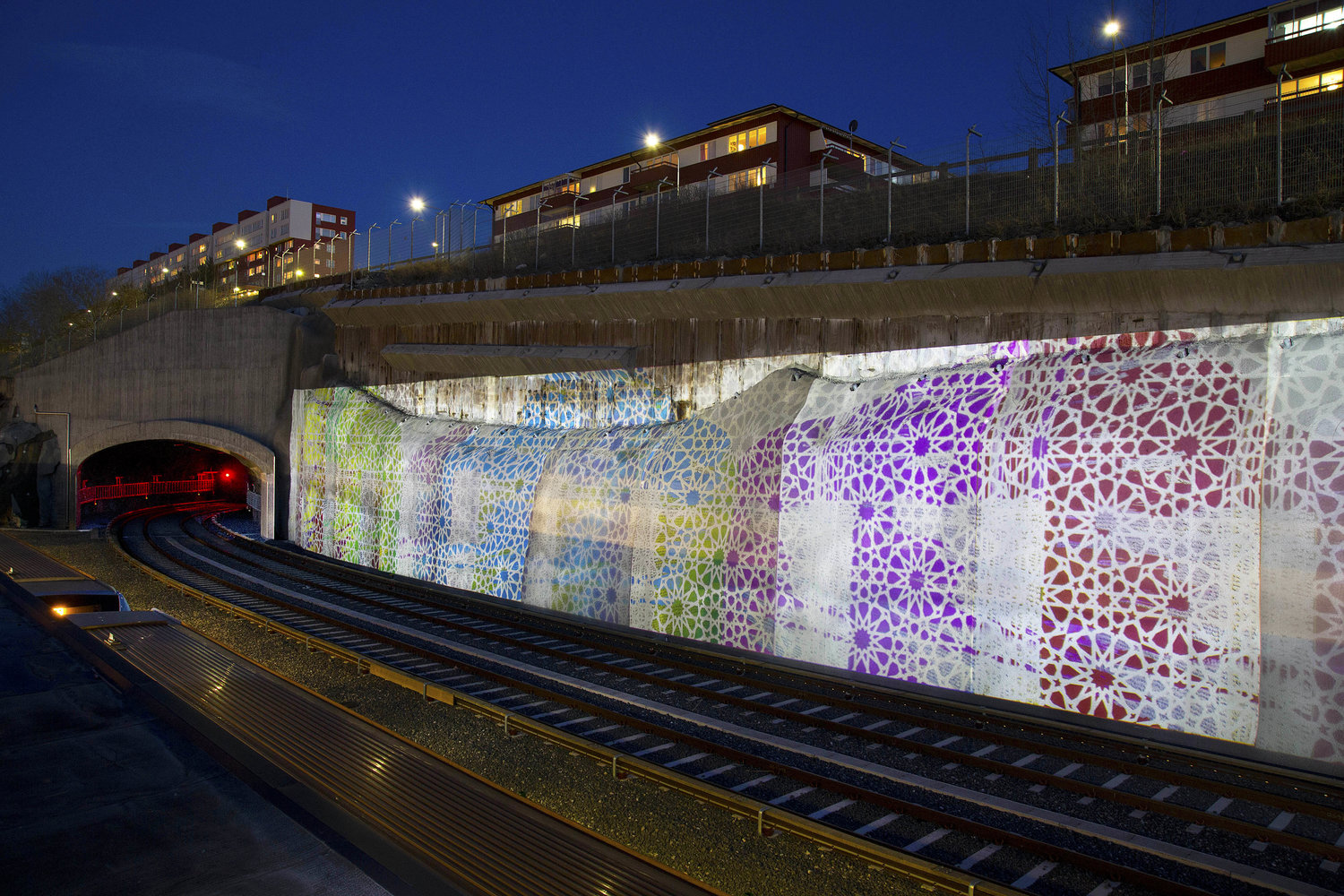
- “A Tribute to Movement”, Public Art at Norsborg Metro Station, 2017
  A Tribute to Movement, Public Art in Norsborg Metro Station, 2017, Stockholm, Sweden
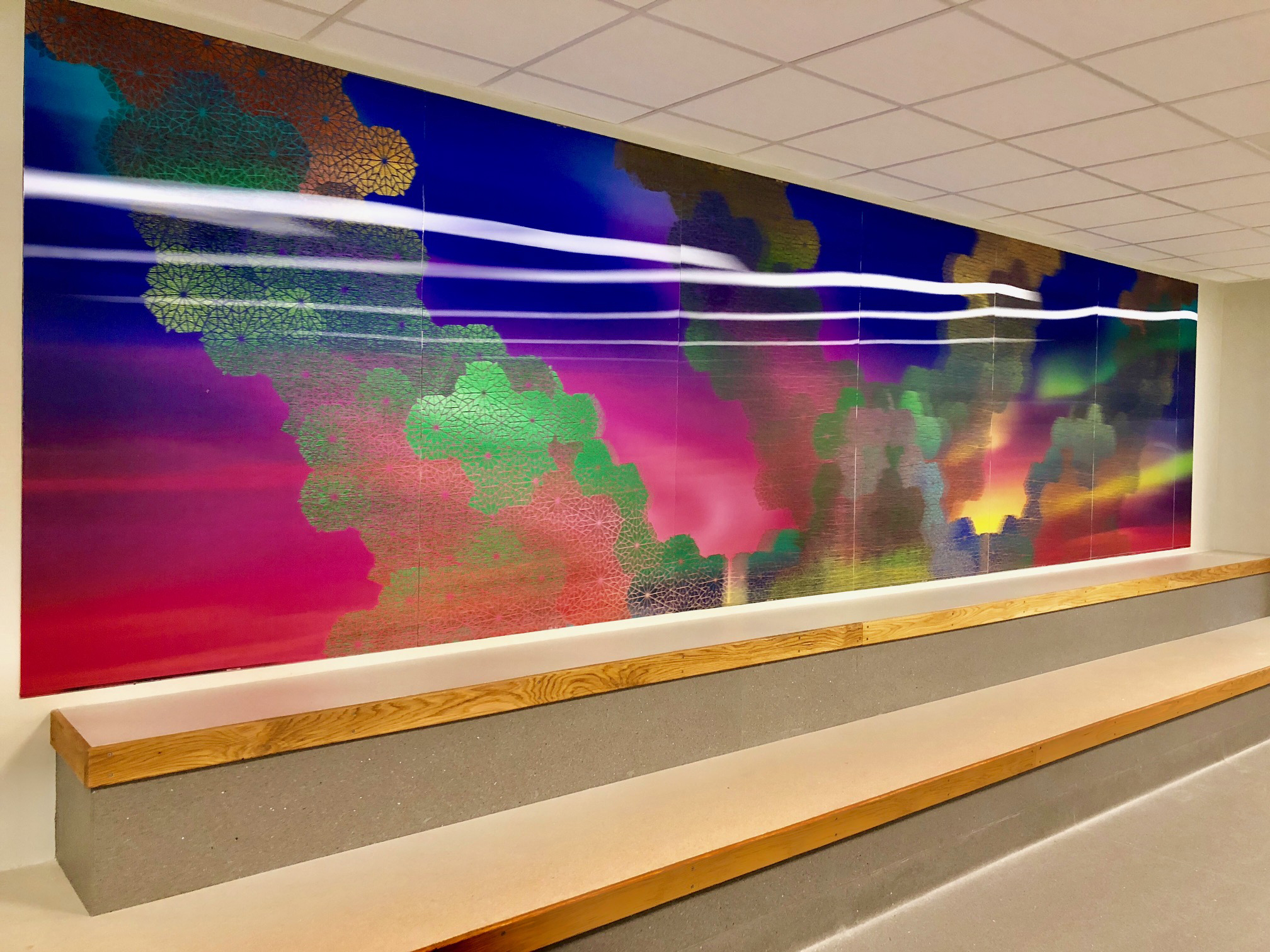
- Th Aurora, Raha Rastifard, Norrbyskolan, Örebro, 2017
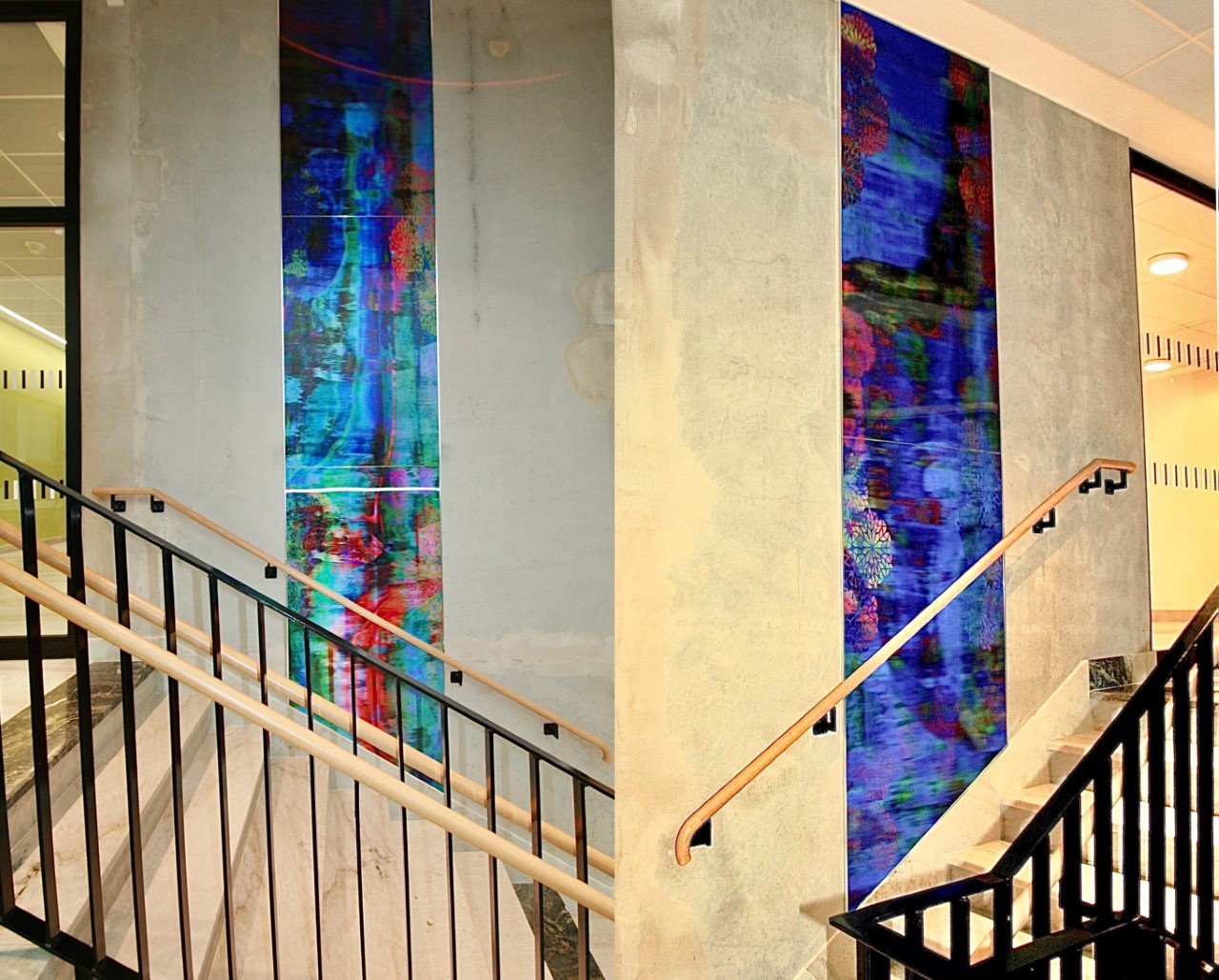
  The Hanging Lotus Garden, Raha Rastifard, 2019 Danderyd Hospital, Stockholm, Sweden,
  The Aurora, Norrbyskolan, 2017, Örebro, Sweden
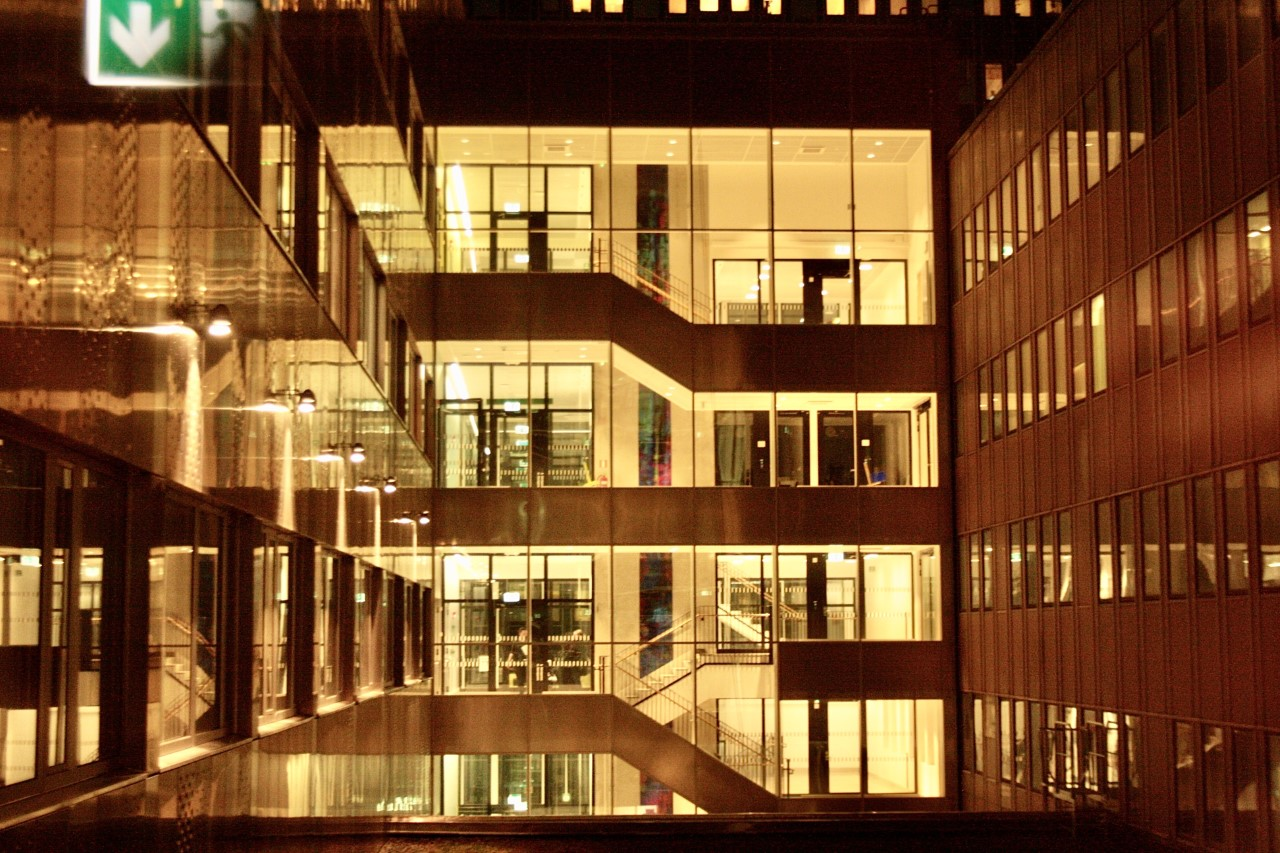
- The Hanging Lotus Garden, Raha Rastifard, 2019 Danderyd Hospital, Stockholm, Sweden,
  The Hanging Lotus Garden, Danderyds Hospital, 2019, Stockholm, Sweden
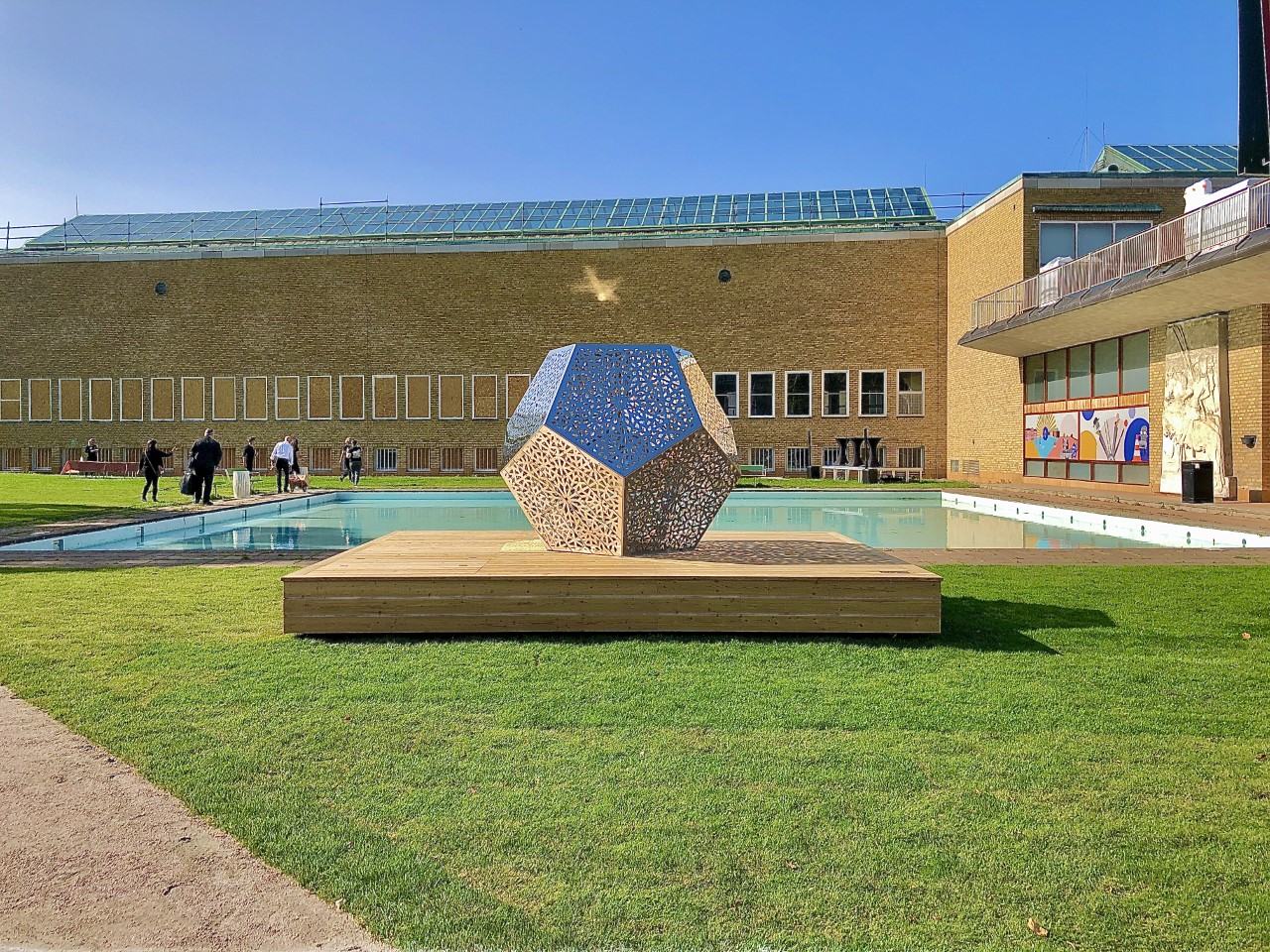
- The Fifth Element, 2020, Östergötland Museum, Linköping, Sweden
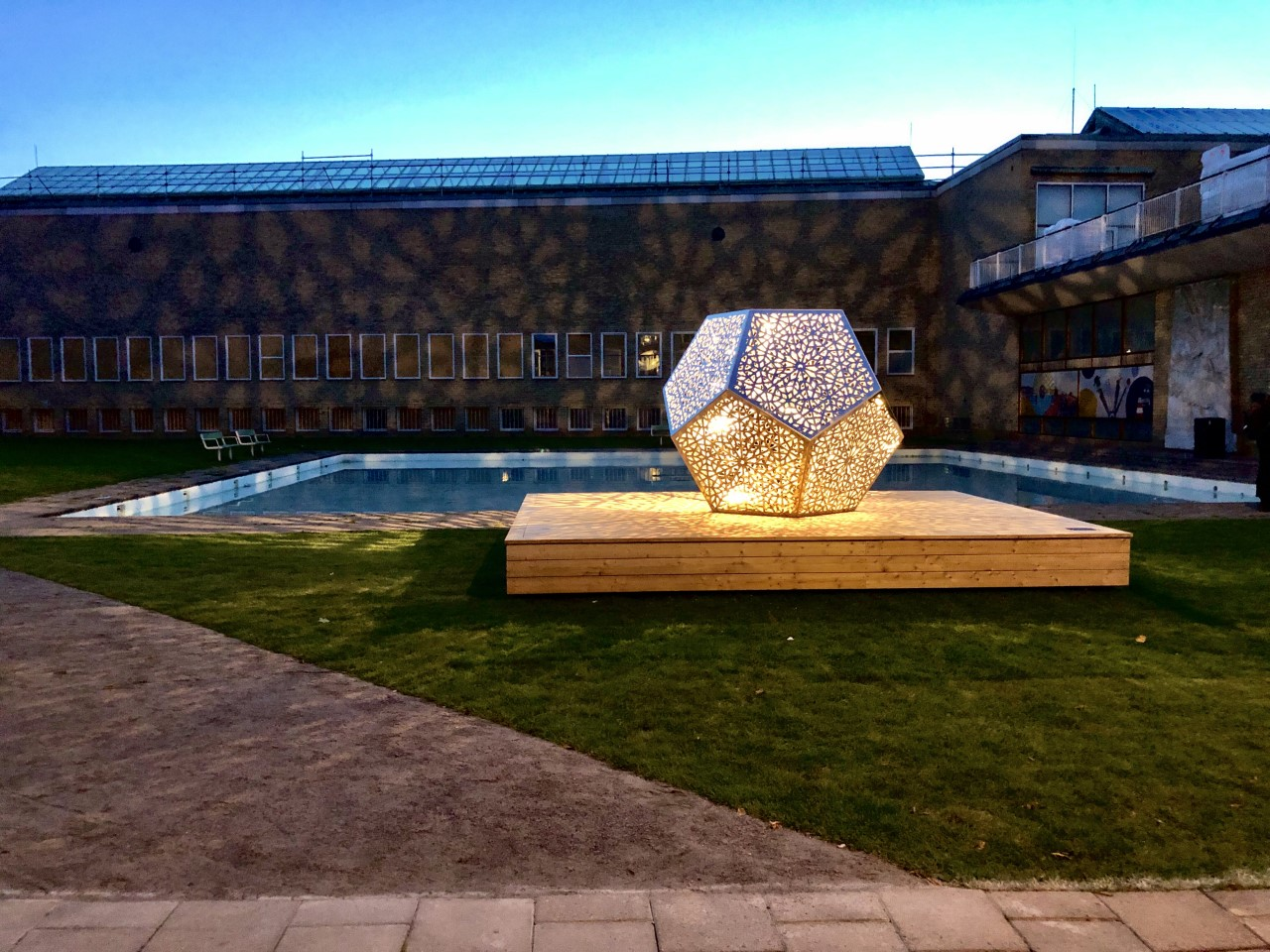
  The Fifth Element at dusk, 2020, Östergötland Museum, Linköping, Sweden
  Fifth Element, 2020, Östergötland Museum, Linköping, Sweden
