= Hallunda metro station =

Stockholm Metro station

Hallunda
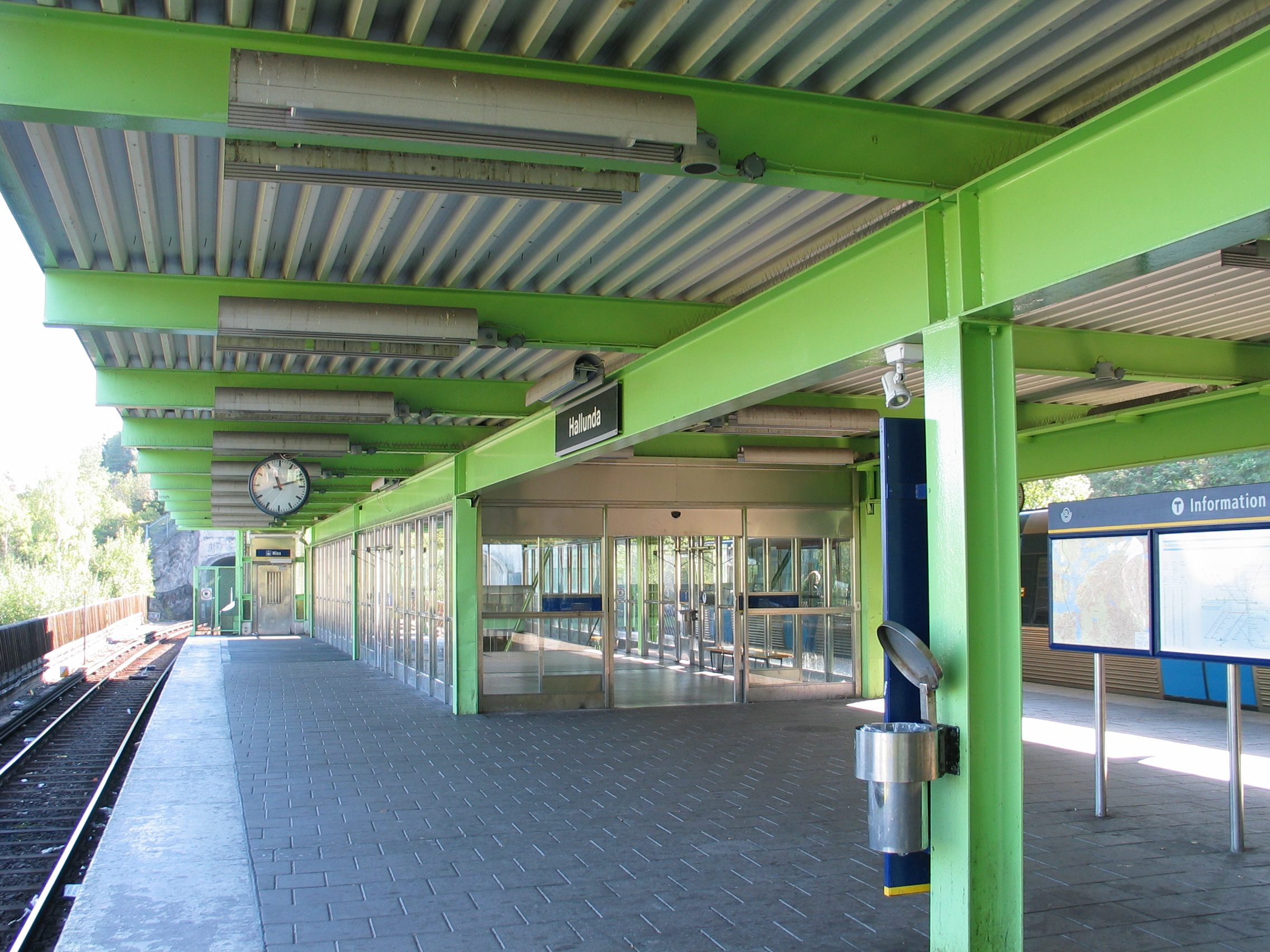

General information
- Coordinates: 59°14′36″N 17°49′31″E
- Elevation: 31.8 m (104 ft) above sea level
- System: Stockholm Metro station
- Owner: Storstockholms Lokaltrafik
- Platforms: 1 island platform
- Tracks: 2

Construction
- Structure type: Elevated
- Accessible: Yes

Other information
- Station code: HLU

History
- Opened: 12 January 1975; 51 years ago

Passengers
- 2019: 4,850 boarding per weekday

Services
Preceding station	Stockholm Metro	Following station
Norsborg Terminus	Line 13	Alby towards Ropsten
Location
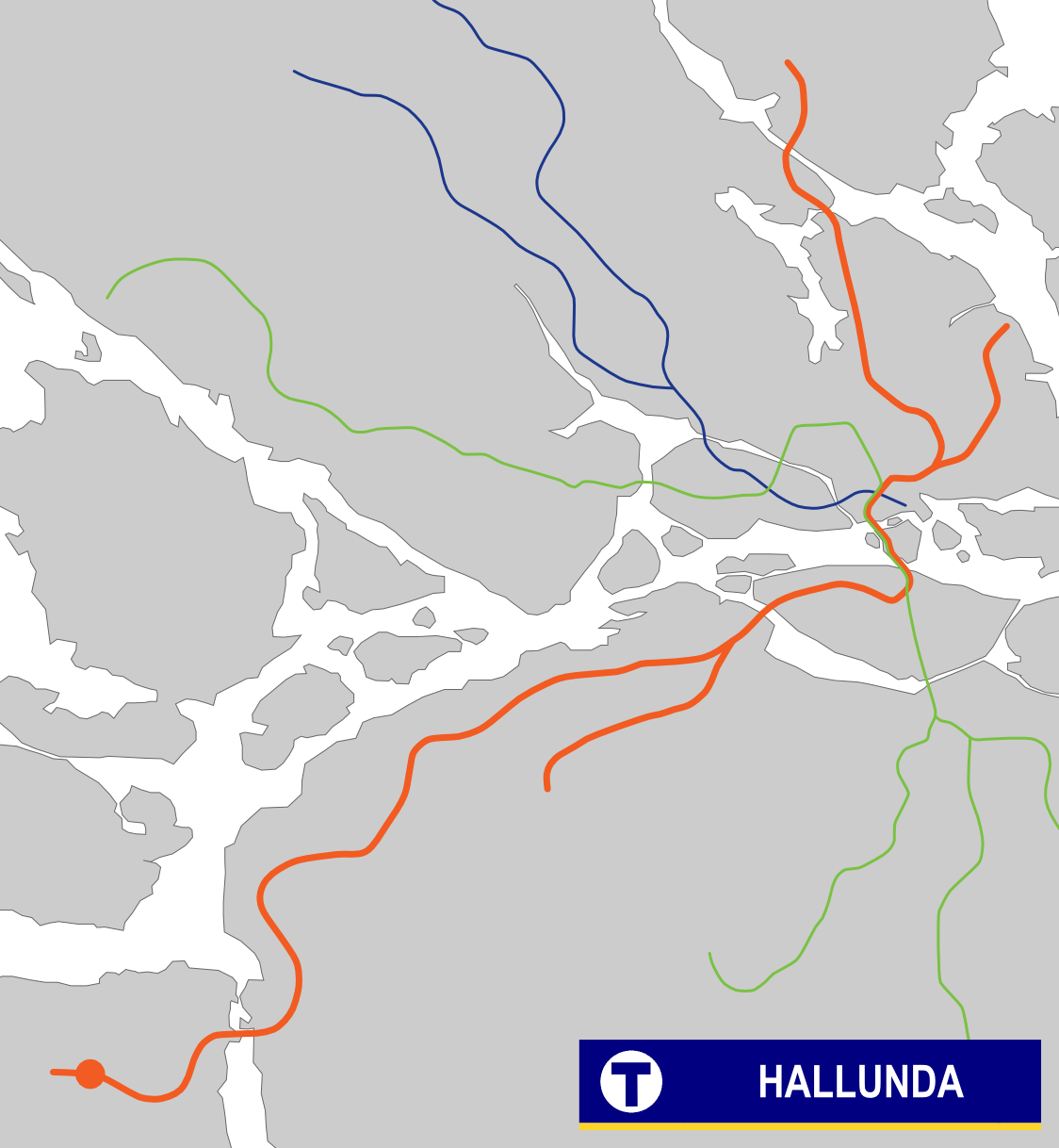

Hallunda is a station on Line 13 of the Red Line of the Stockholm Metro, located in Hallunda, Botkyrka Municipality, Sweden. The station opened on 12 January 1975 as part of the extension from Fittja to Norsborg. The distance from Slussen is 20.1 kilometres (12.5 mi).

The station has an island platform that is situated above ground, with the booking office and station access below the platforms. There are entrances to the booking office from the Hallunda centrum, to the north via a footbridge, and from Skarpbrunnavägen, to the south. There is a bus station situated to the north of the station.

The station has an artwork, consisting of plexiglass rods and a neon loop, by Kazuko Tamura from 1993, adjacent to the ticket hall.

== Gallery ==
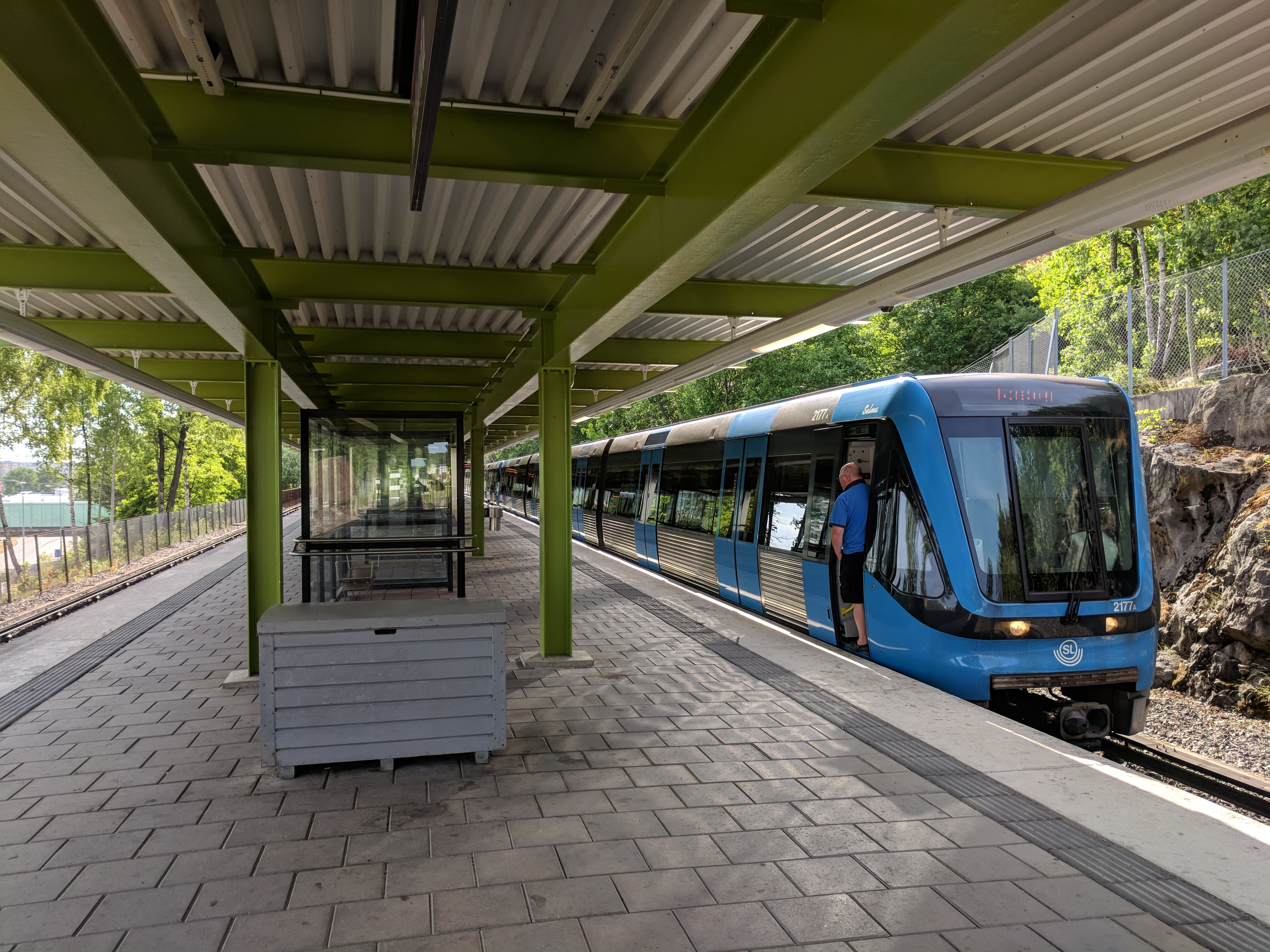
Platform with train

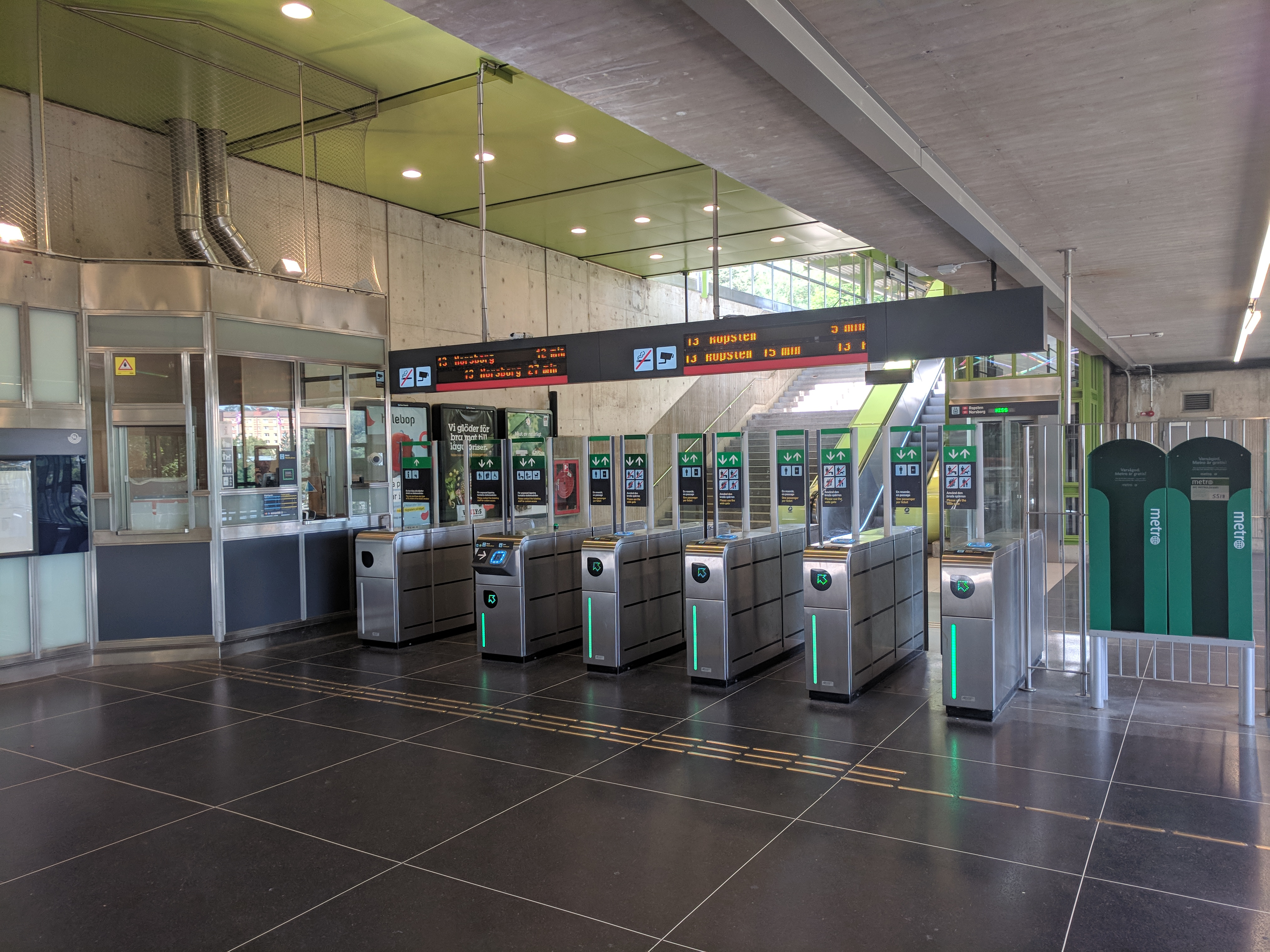
Booking hall with access to platform

Art work with entrance to footbridge

Station from above
