= Norsborg metro station =

Stockholm Metro station

Norsborg
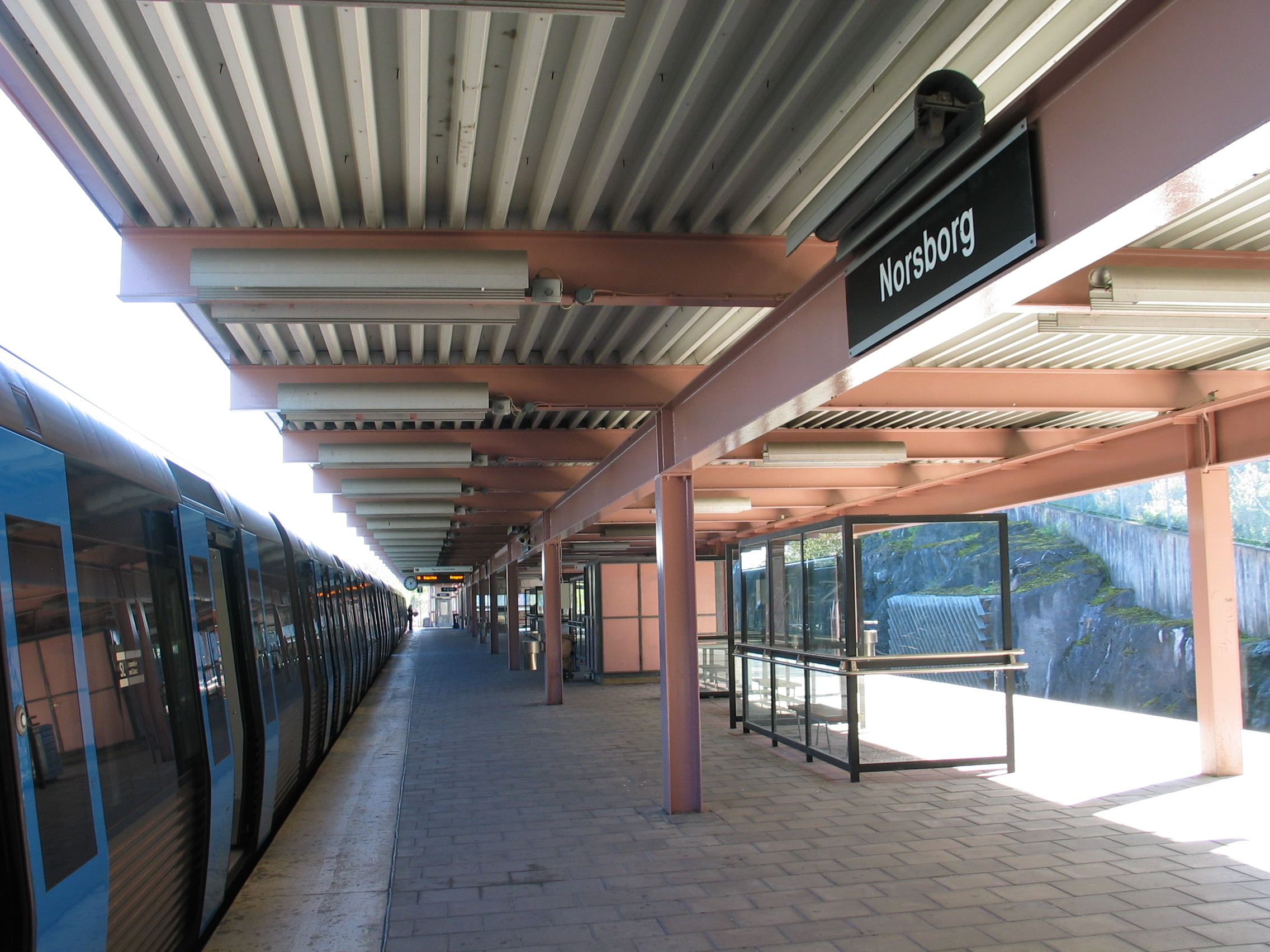
- Station platform in September 2006. Parts of the new Norsborg Depot were later excavated from the rockface shown on the right.

General information
- Coordinates: 59°14′38″N 17°48′47″E
- Elevation: 31.8 m (104 ft) above sea level
- System: Stockholm Metro station
- Owner: Storstockholms Lokaltrafik
- Platforms: 1 island platform
- Tracks: 2

Construction
- Structure type: Elevated
- Accessible: Yes

Other information
- Station code: NOR

History
- Opened: 12 January 1975; 51 years ago

Passengers
- 2019: 2,850 boarding per weekday

Services
Preceding station	Stockholm Metro	Following station
Terminus	Line 13	Hallunda towards Ropsten
Location
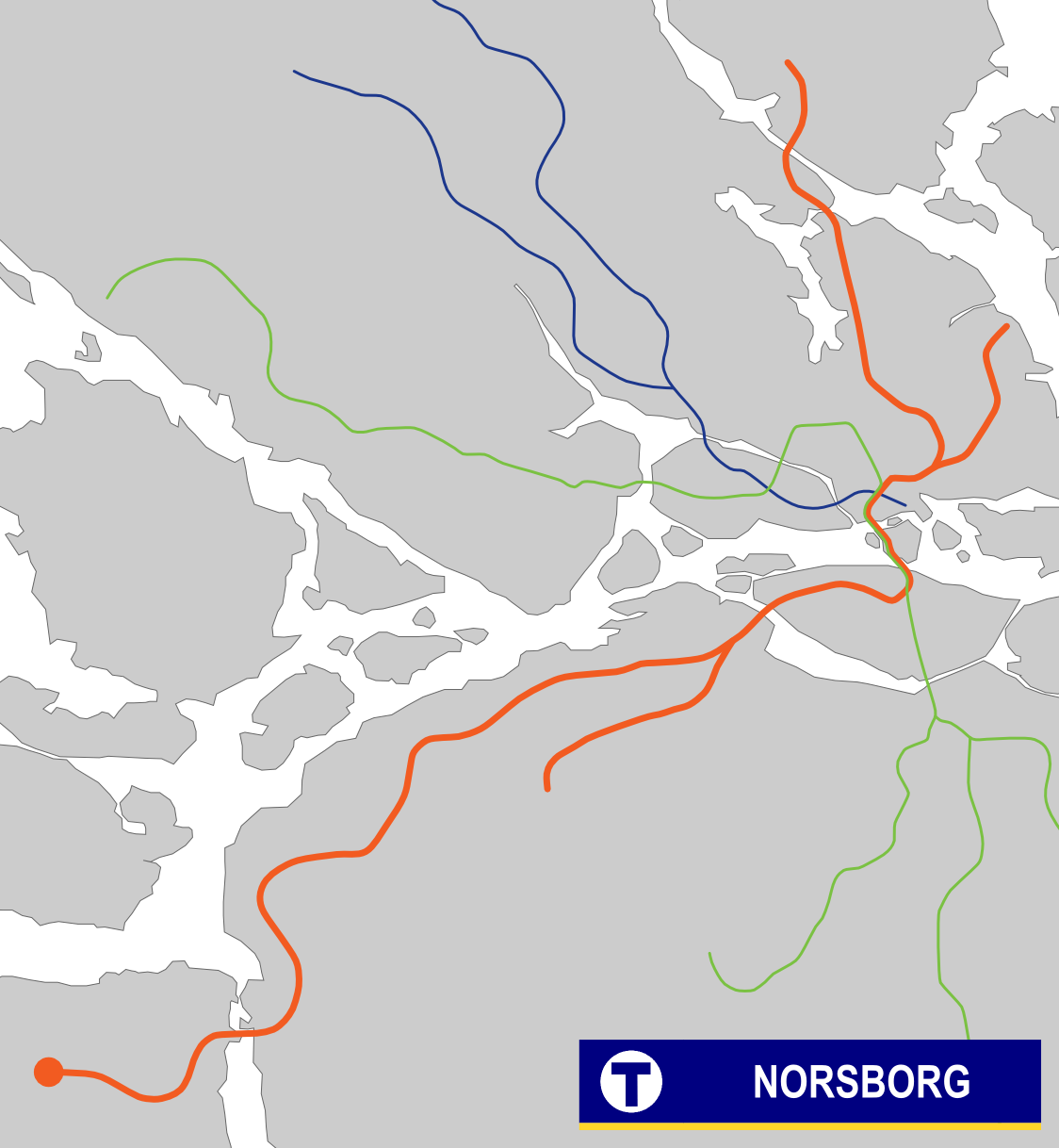

Norsborg is the terminus station on Line 13 of the Red Line of the Stockholm Metro, located in Norsborg, Botkyrka Municipality, Sweden. The station opened on 12 January 1975 as the southwestern terminus of the extension from Fittja. The distance from Slussen is 20.8 kilometres (12.9 mi).

The station has an island platform that is situated above ground, with the booking office and station access below the platforms. There are entrances to the booking office from Hallundavägen, to the north, and, via escalators, from Skarpbrunnavägen, to the south. There is a bus station situated to the north of the station.

The station has two artworks. My Friend, an aluminium sculpture by Eva and Peter Moritz from 2006, is in the ticket hall. A tribute to movement, by Raha Rastifard is projected onto a rock wall by the platform and was inaugurated in 2017.

== Norsborg Depot ==
The new Norsborg Depot was constructed adjacent to the station between 2013 and 2017. The new depot consists of an underground train wash, three underground caverns for stabling up to 17 trains, and an above ground maintenance building. It houses the new SL C30 trains, which entered service on the Red line in 2020.

The depot is entered via a tunnel entrance just west of the station, and the train wash and storage caverns form a complete 360 degree loop, re-emerging from a second tunnel entrance next to the station to access the above ground maintenance building, which is built above the first tunnel entrance.

== Gallery ==
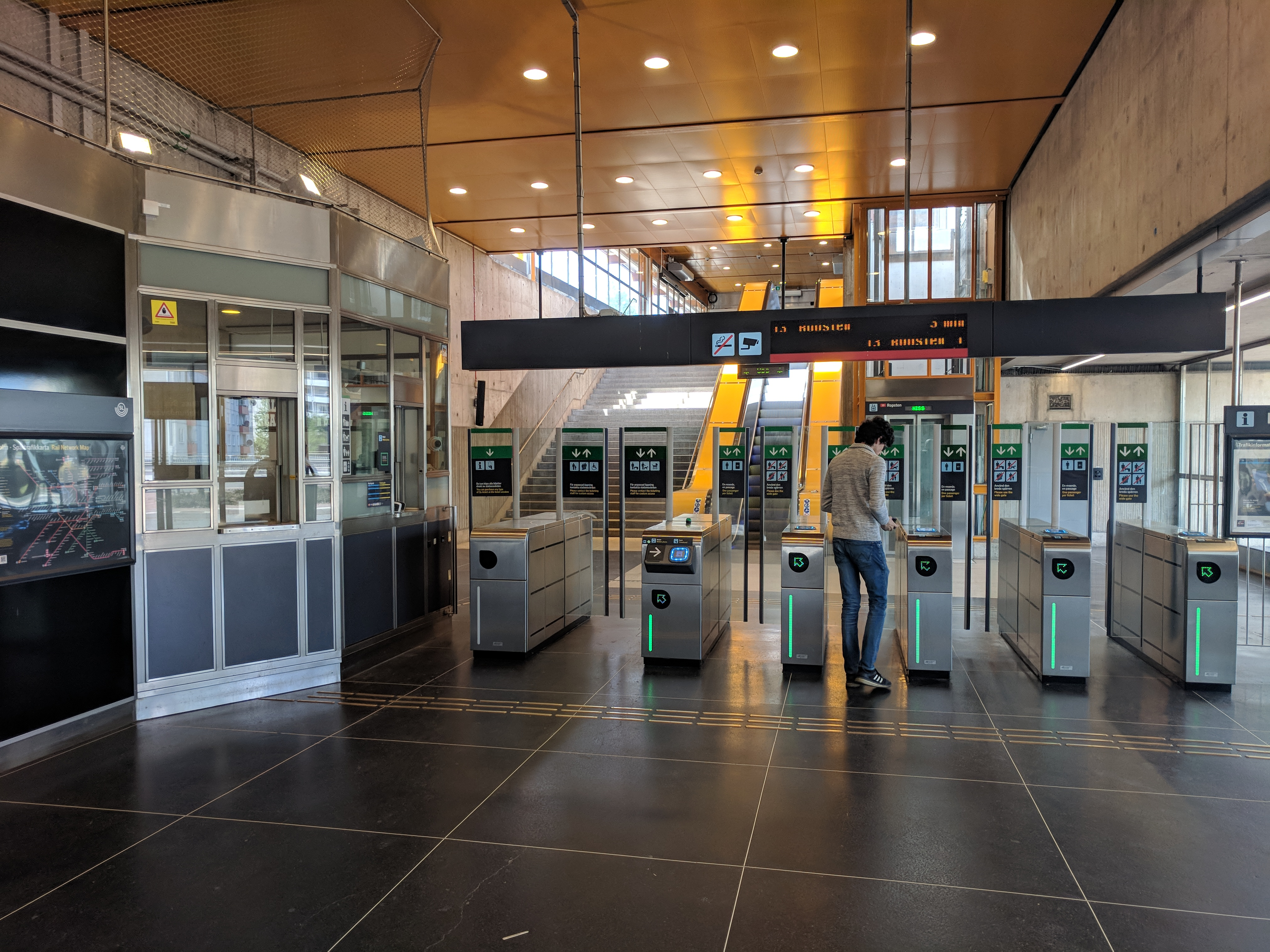
Booking hall with access to platform

Platform with depot tracks to right

Entrance to depot with maintenance shed above

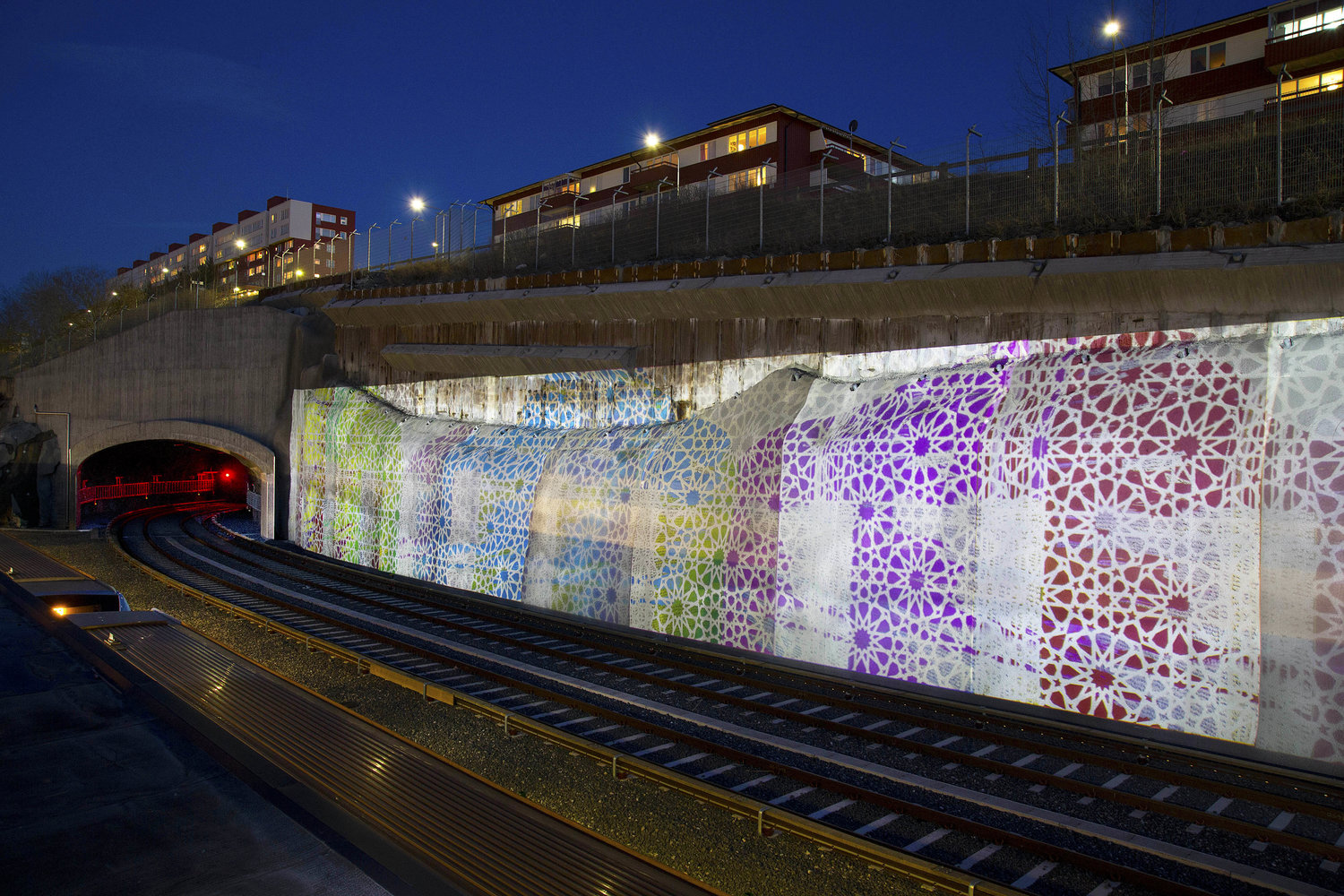
Art work A tribute to movement
