= Näckrosen metro station =

Stockholm Metro station

Näckrosen
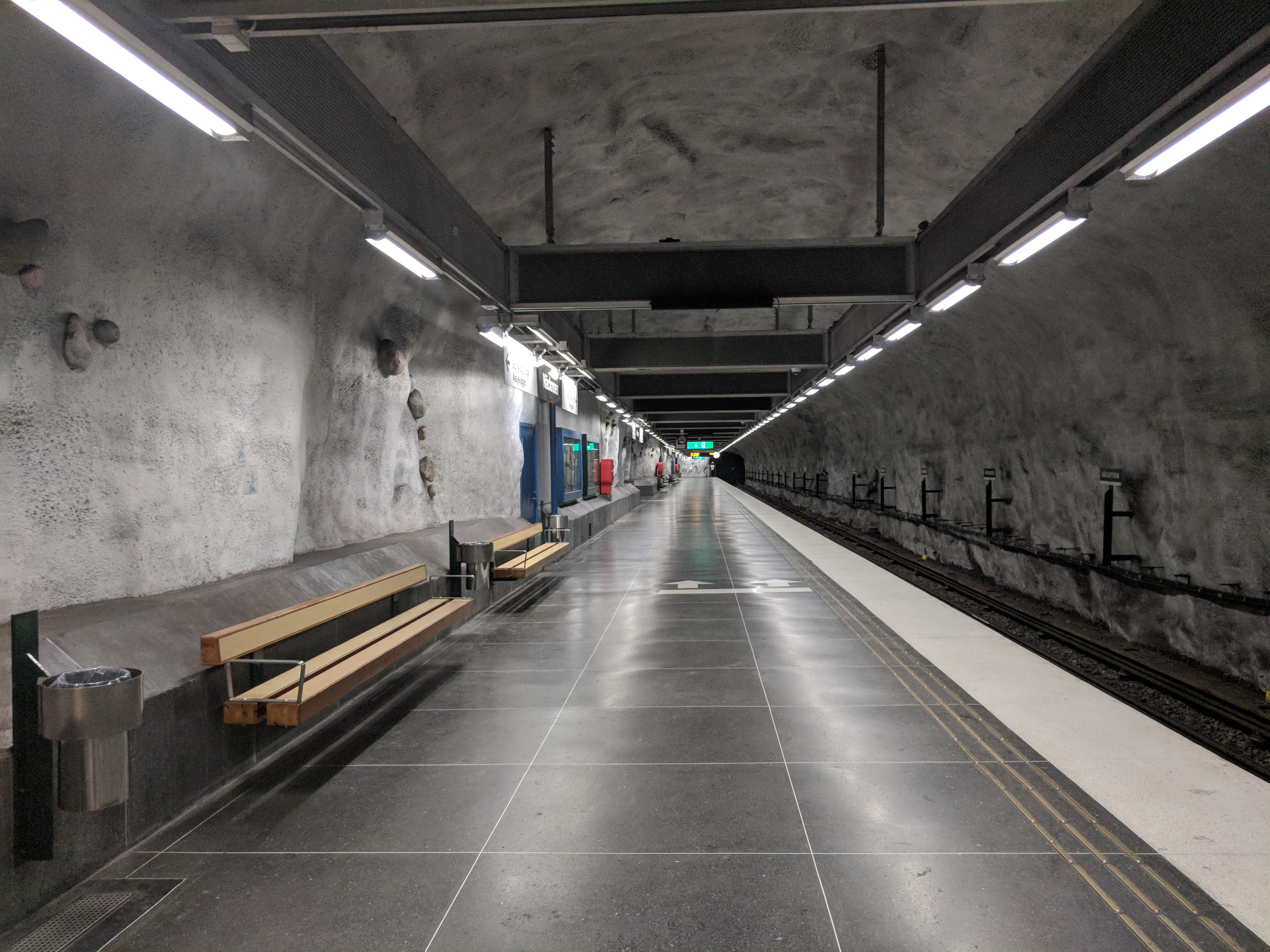

General information
- Location: Råsunda, Solna
- Coordinates: 59°21′59″N 17°59′01″E
- System: Stockholm Metro station
- Owner: Storstockholms Lokaltrafik
- Platforms: 1 island platform
- Tracks: 2

Construction
- Structure type: Underground
- Accessible: Yes

Other information
- Station code: NÄR

History
- Opened: 31 August 1975; 51 years ago

Passengers
- 2019: 4,500 boarding per weekday

Services
Preceding station	Stockholm Metro	Following station
Solna centrum towards Kungsträdgården	Line 11	Hallonbergen towards Akalla
Location
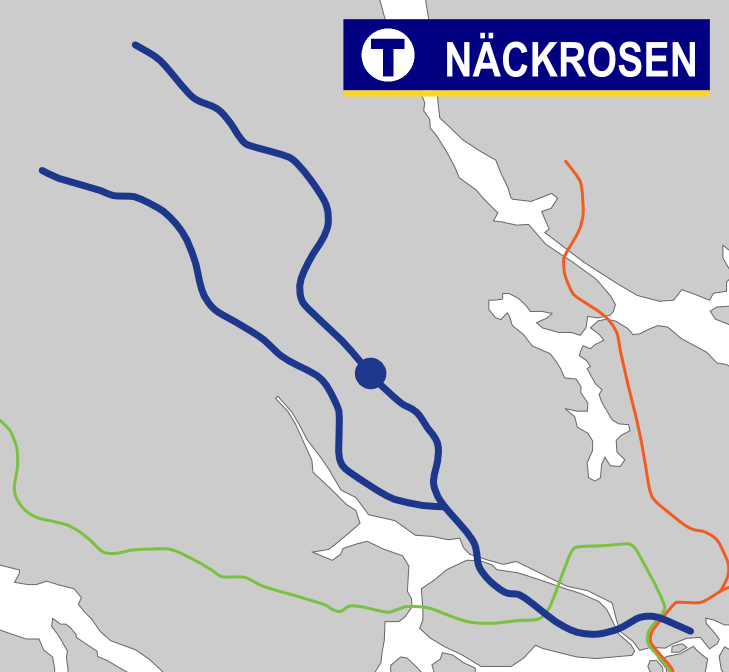

Näckrosen (meaning the water lily) is a Blue Line of the Stockholm Metro. The station is located in Solna Municipality (northwestern end of Råsunda area), but one of the entrances is in Sundbyberg Municipality (Storskogen square). The Näckrosen station was opened on 31 August 1975 as part the first stretch of the Blue Line between T-Centralen and Hjulsta. The trains were running via Hallonbergen and Rinkeby. It is located deep underground under a residential area, close to the Gamla Filmstaden former movie production area.

== Gallery ==
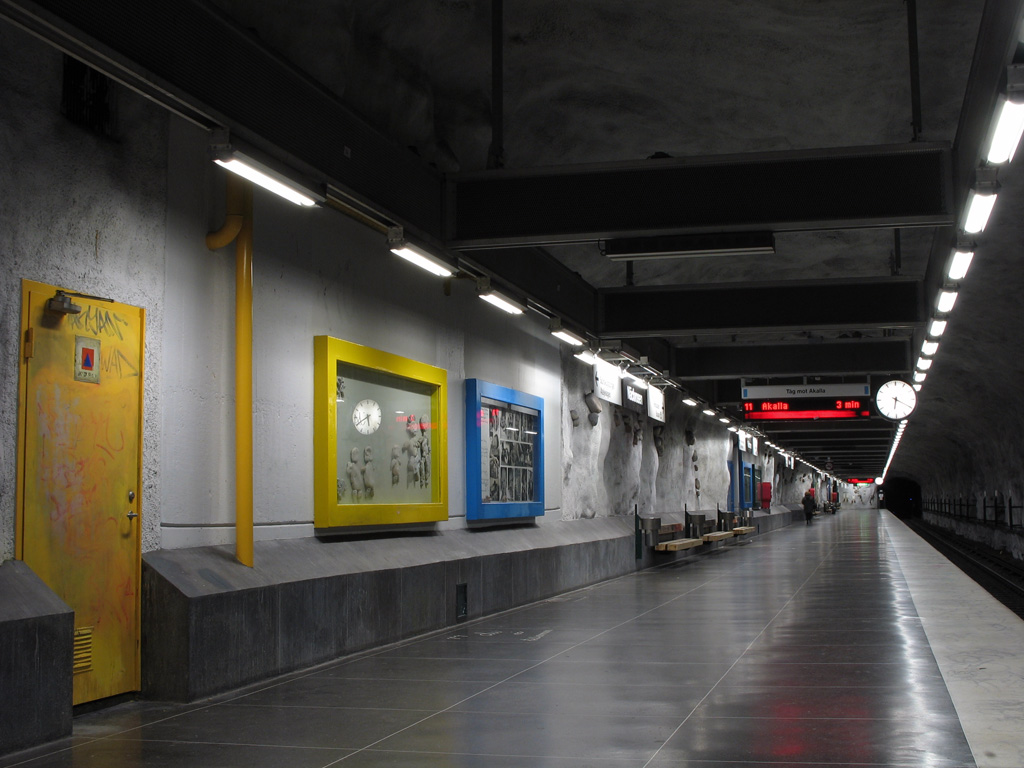
Platform

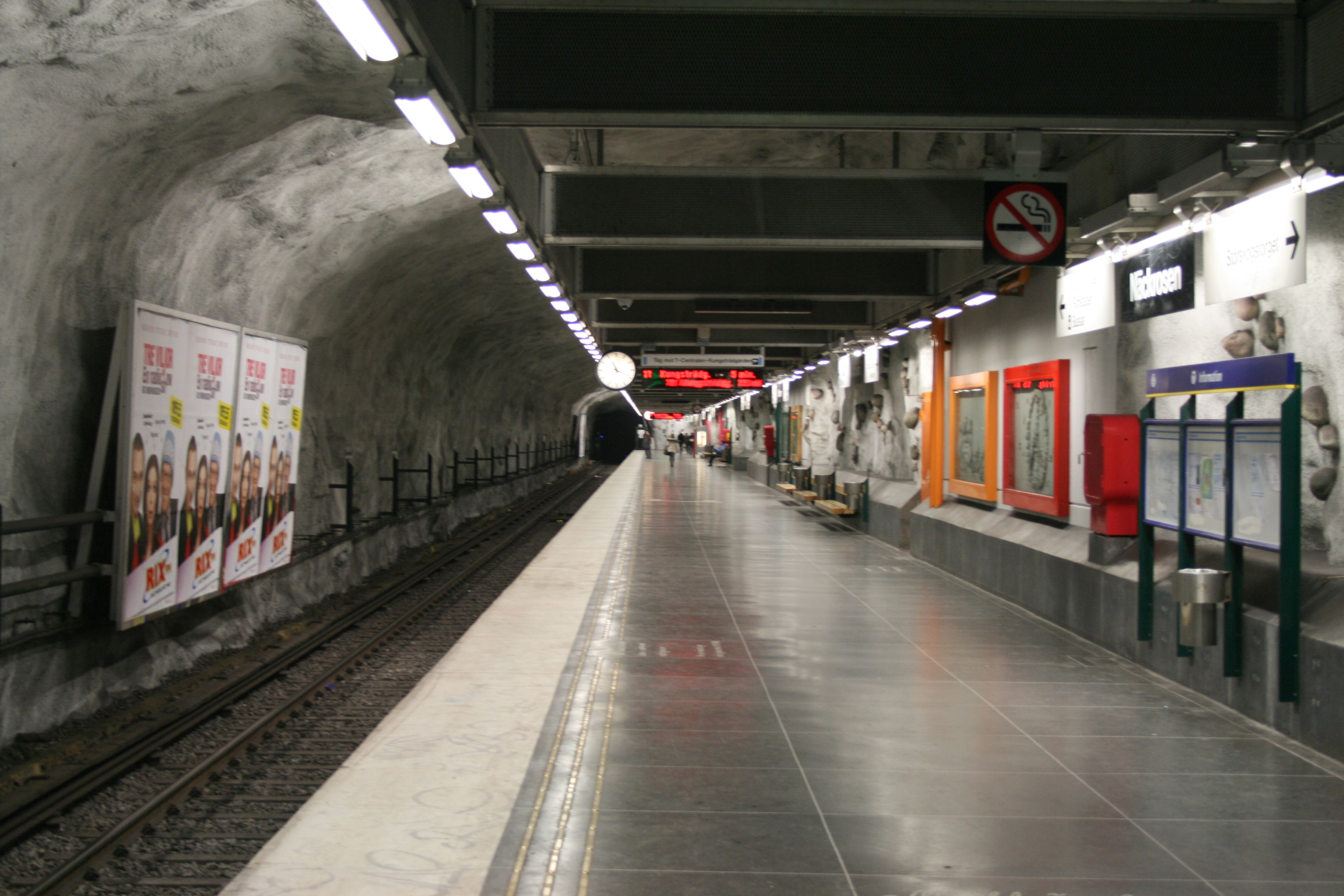
Platform

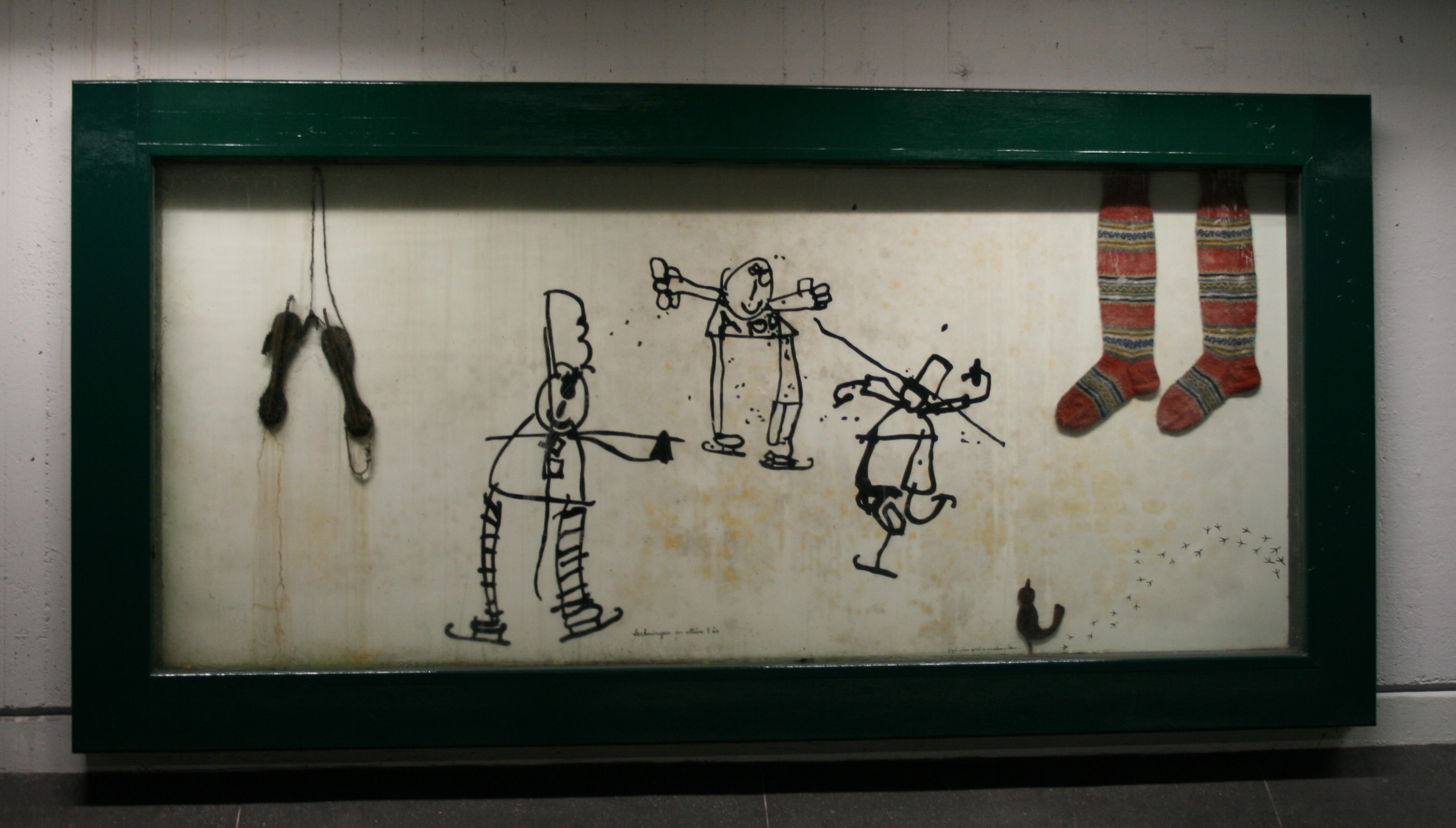
Station's artwork

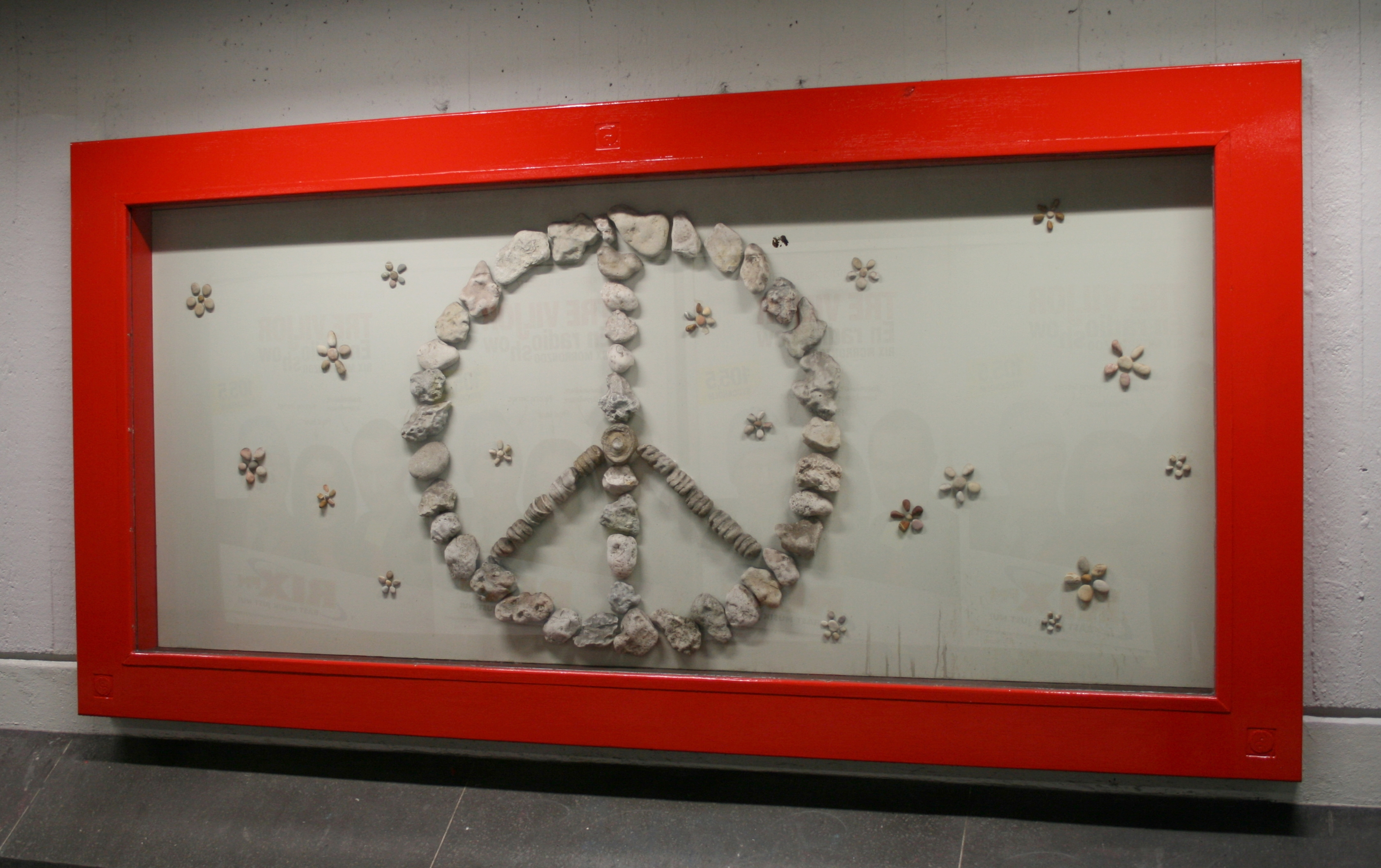
Station's artwork - symbol of Peace

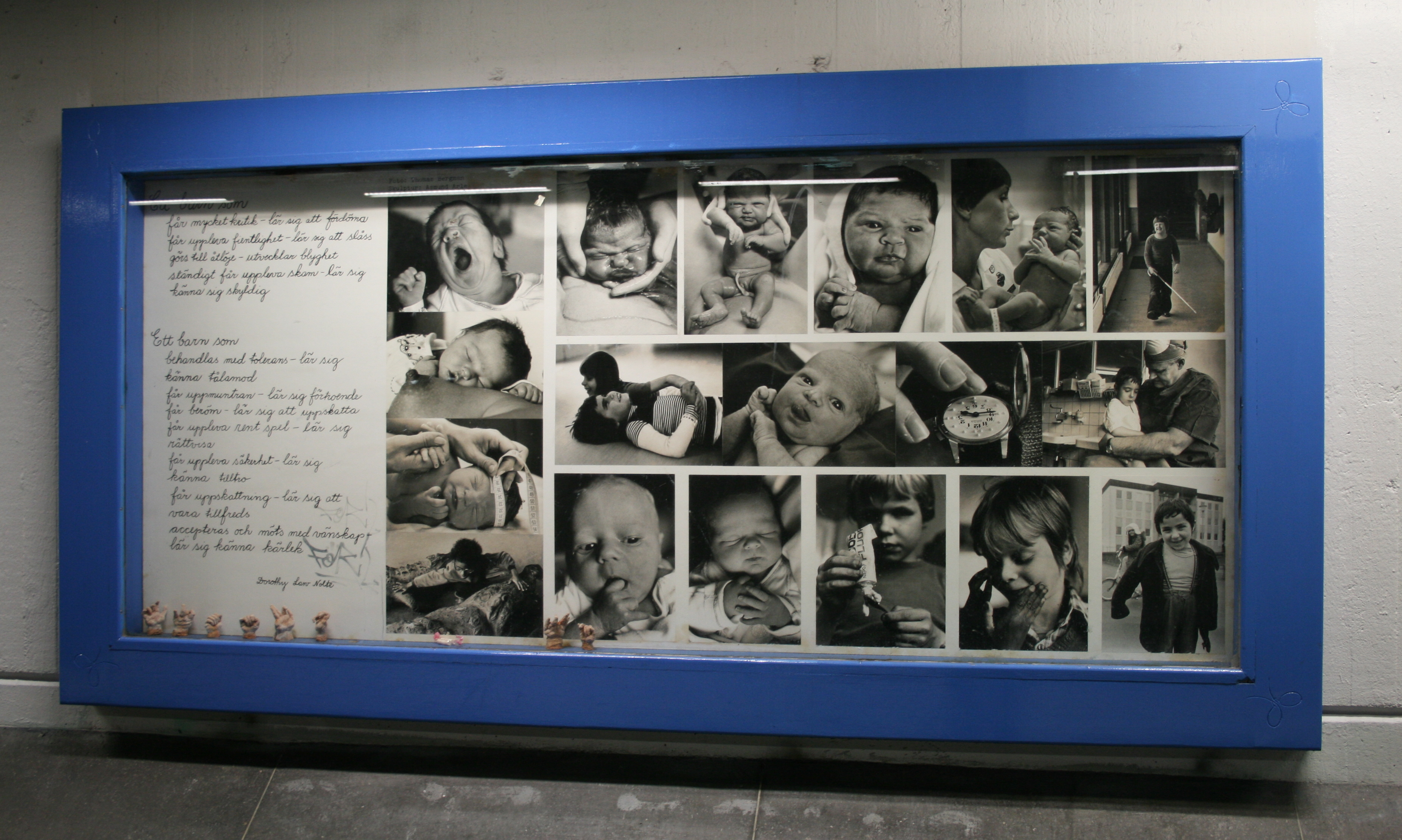
Station's artwork

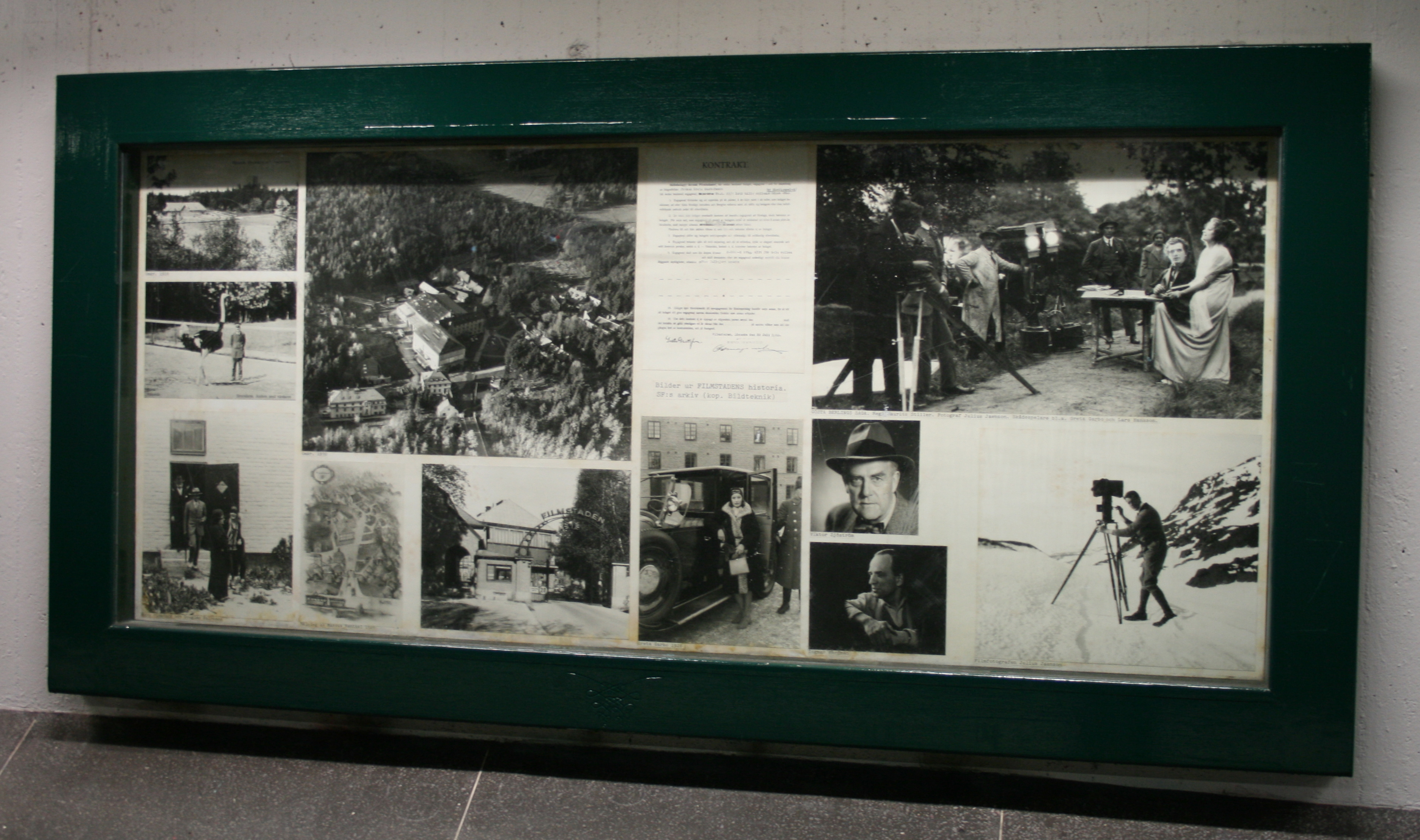
Station's artwork

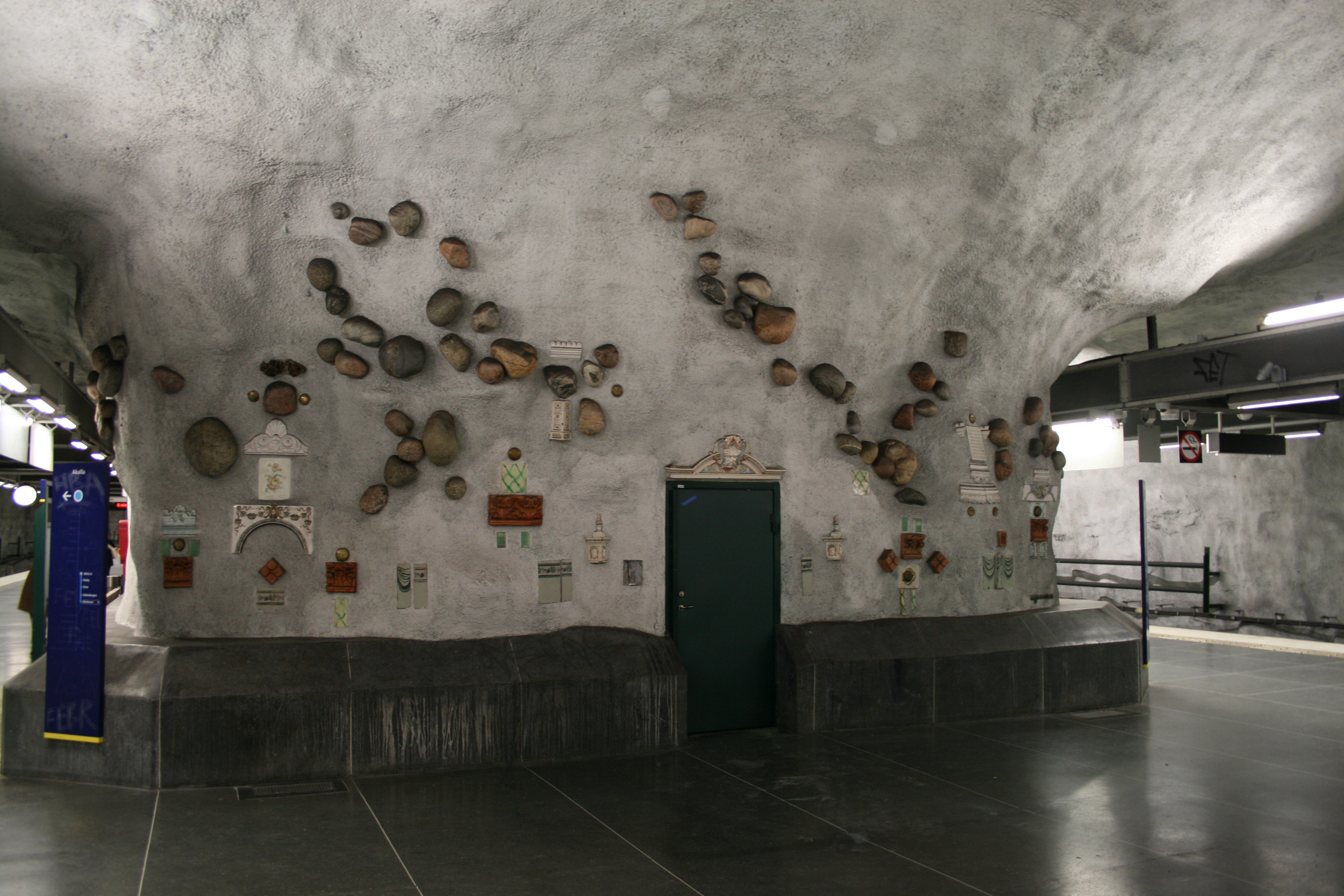
Station's artwork

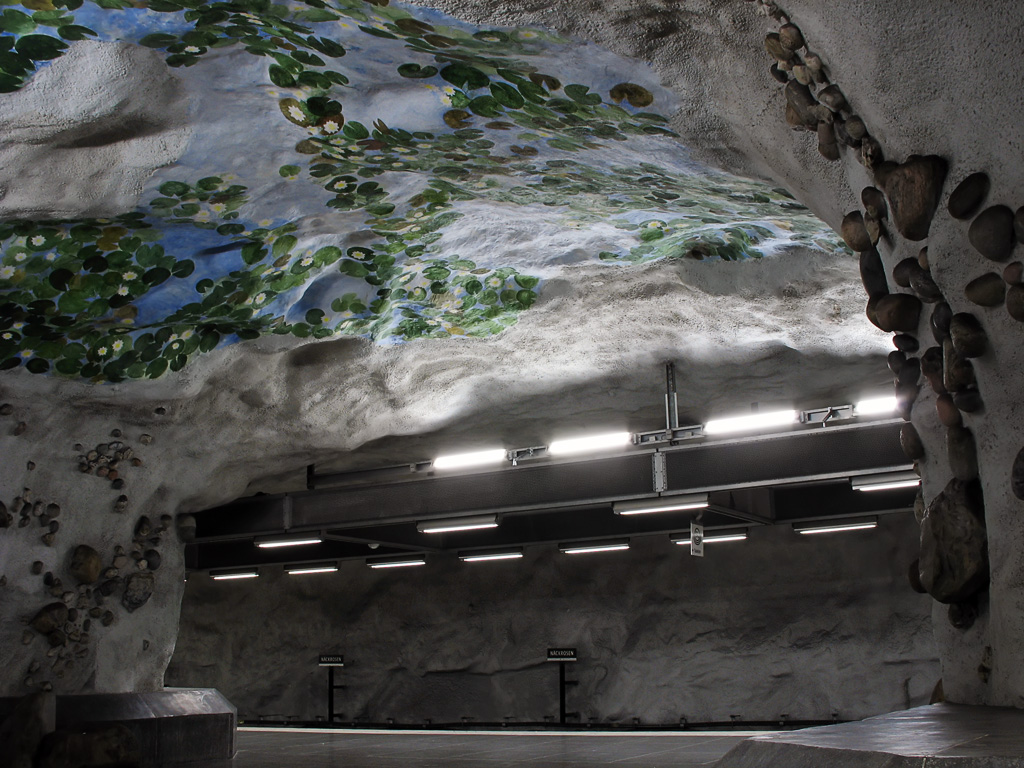
Station's artwork

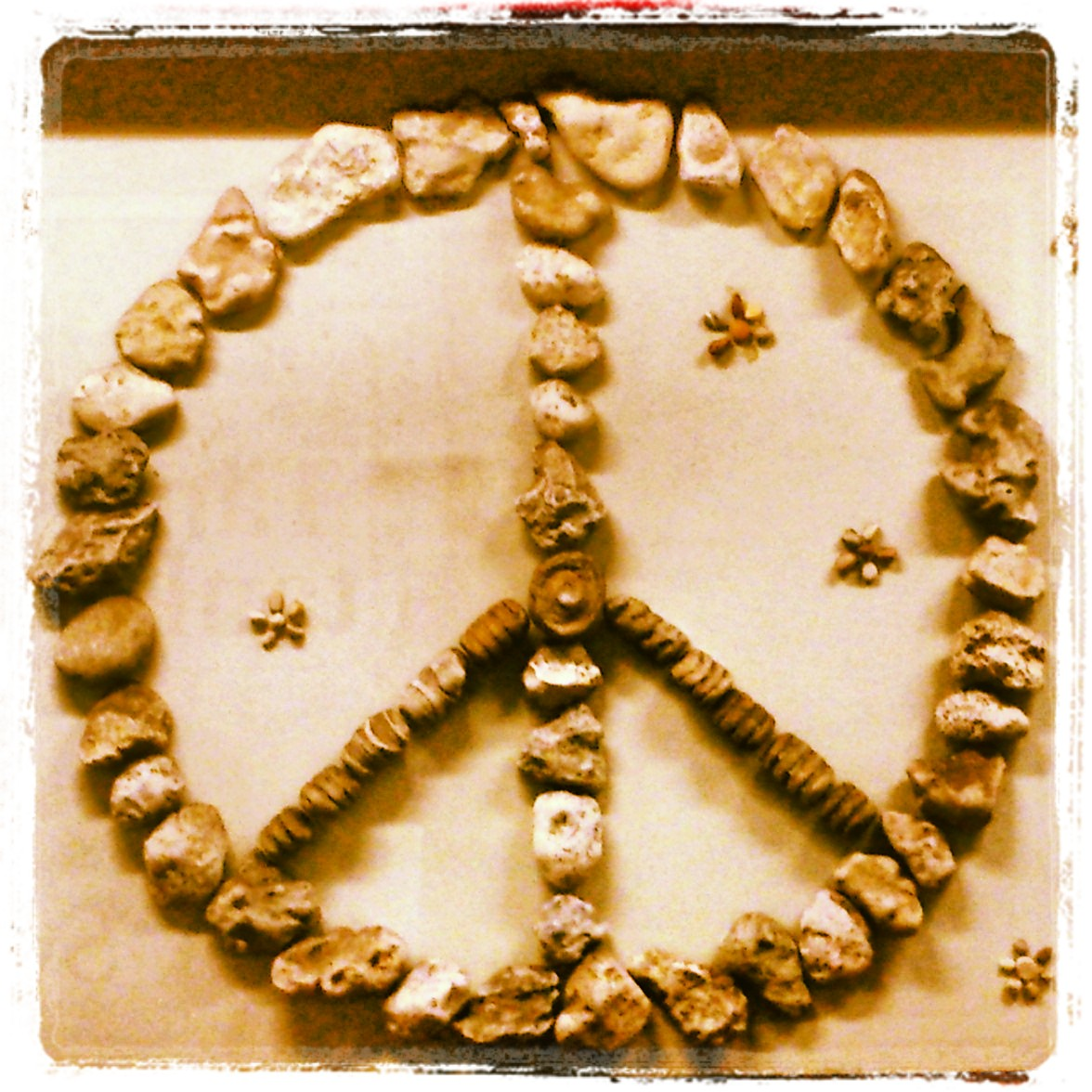
Station's artwork - symbol of Peace

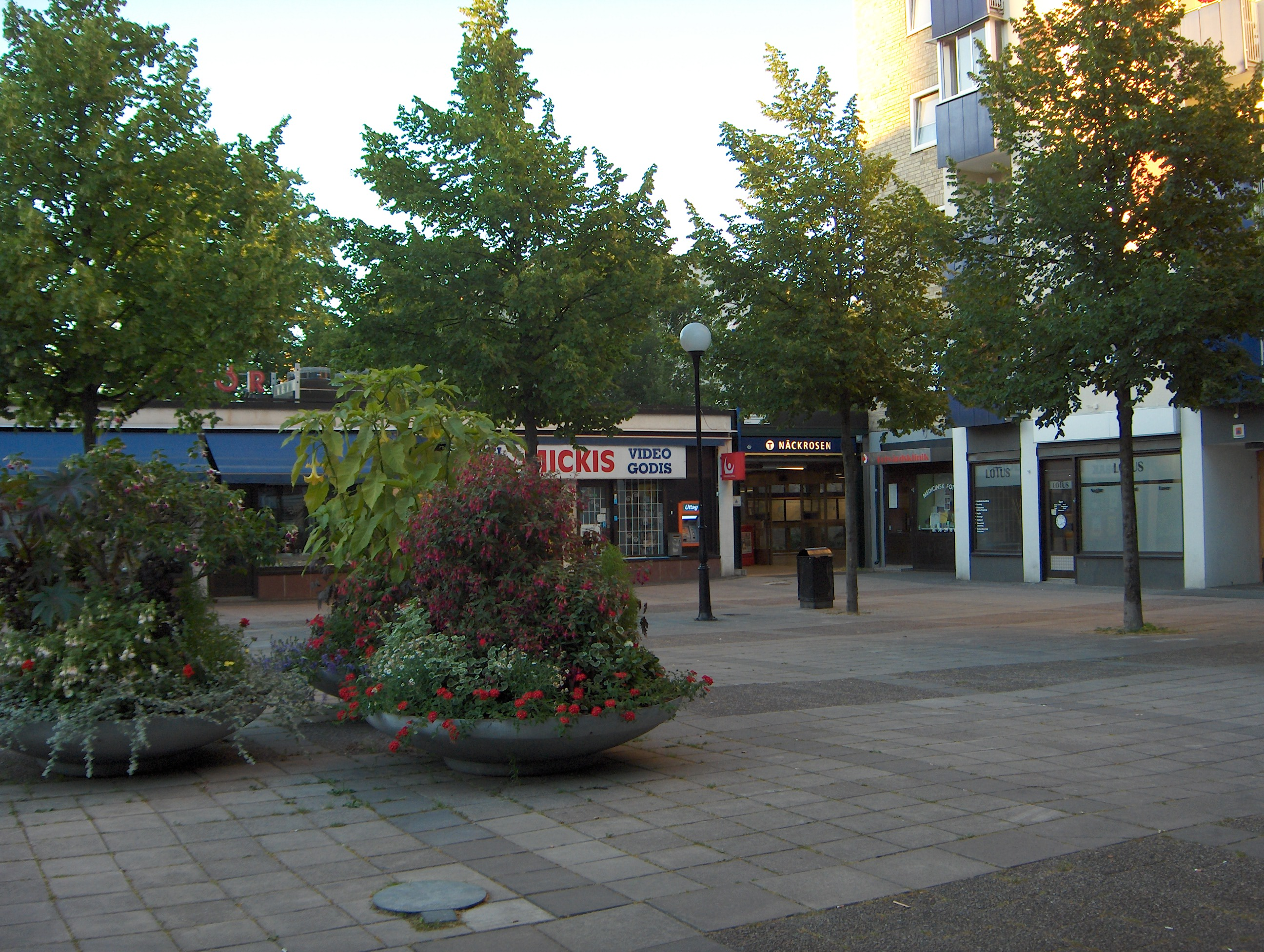
Western entrance, at Storskogstorget in Sundbyberg
