= Brotorp =

Coordinates: 59°23′0″N 17°58′30″E

Brotorp Sweden is a district in Sundbyberg Municipality with 2172 inhabitants (in 2019), and a suburb in the Stockholm metropolitan area. It is the western part of the Järvastaden residential building project, and consists of low multi-residential buildings. The first inhabitant moved into Brotorp in 2007. The district Lilla Ursvik is located to the west.
