= Ör =

Coordinates: 59°22′30″N 17°58′38″E

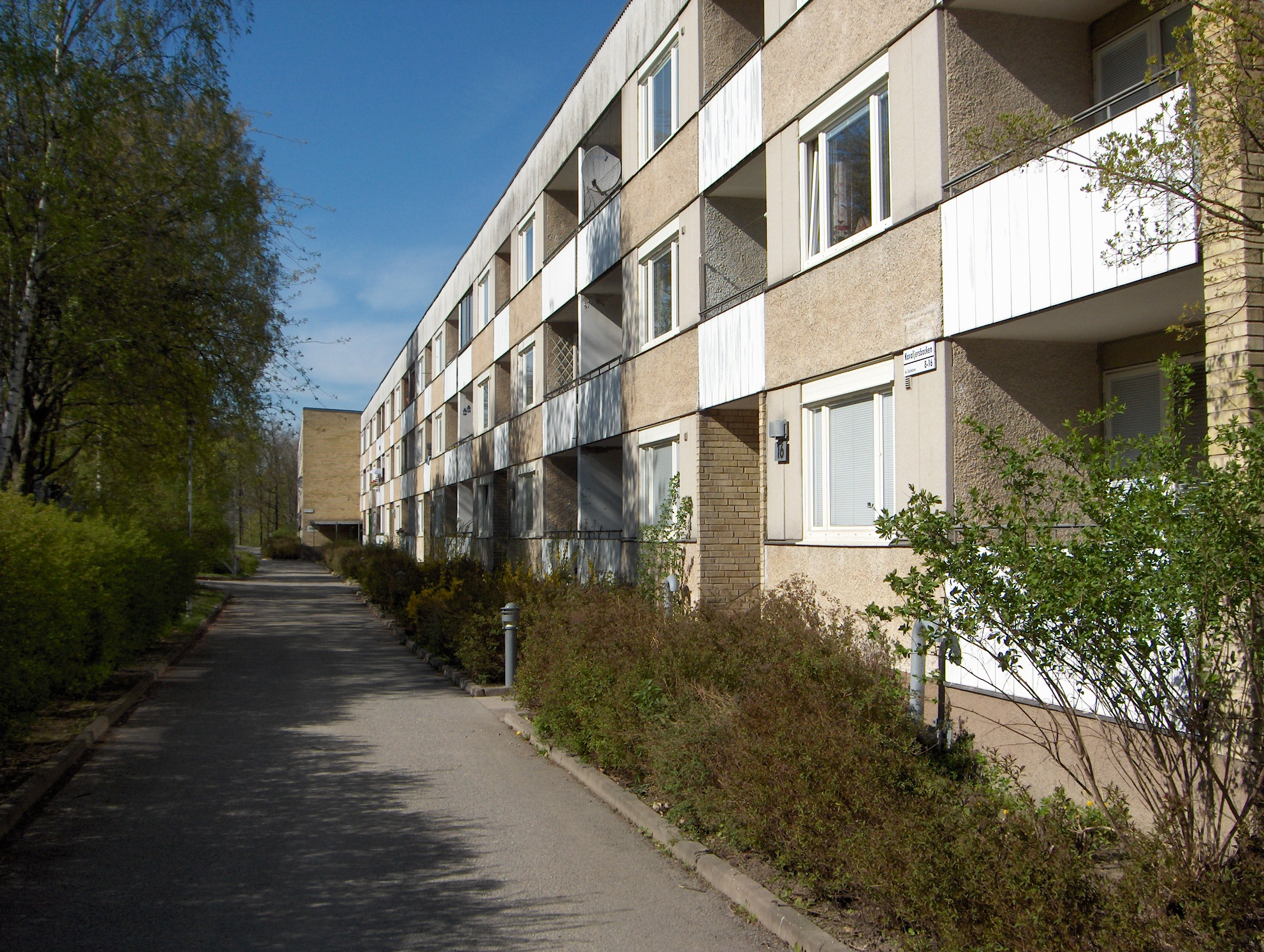
Typical residential building in Ör

Ör is a district in Sundbyberg Municipality with 6550 inhabitants (in 2019), and a suburb in the Stockholm metropolitan area.

== Geography ==
It is located east of Hallonbergen, and consists of multiresidential buildings from the 1960s. Northern Ör consists of a bus depot, a substation, a school, forest, stables and sports areas.
