= Storskogen =

Urban district in Sundbyberg municipality, Sweden

Coordinates: 59°22′06″N 17°58′45″E

Storskogen is a district in Sundbyberg Municipality with 3062 inhabitants (in 2019), and a suburb in the Stockholm metropolitan area. It is located between Central Sundbyberg and the Solna Municipality district Råsunda. The metro station Näckrosen has an exit here. The area was a mix of forest and meadows until the 1950s, when the current residential area was built there.

== Gallery ==
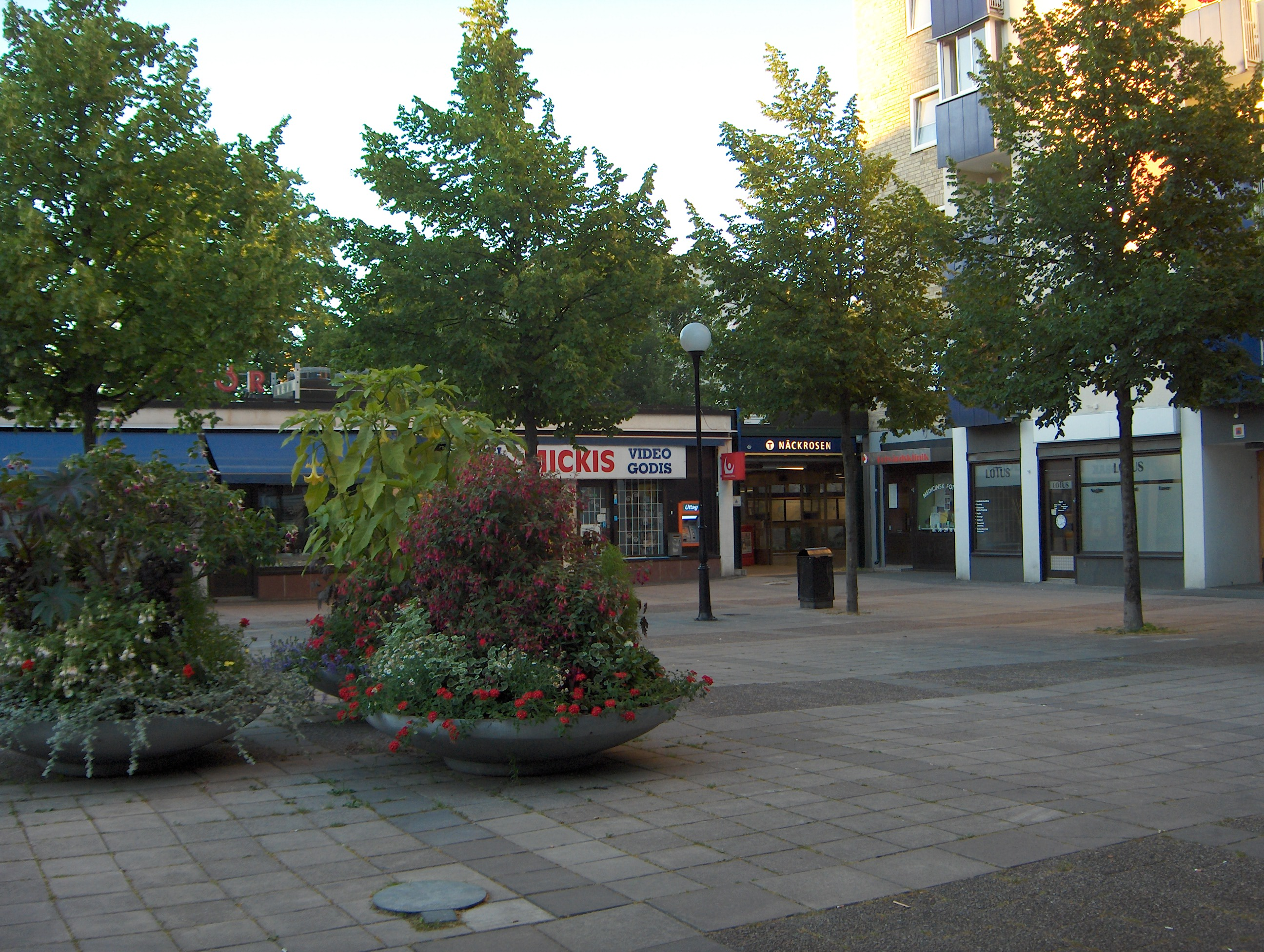

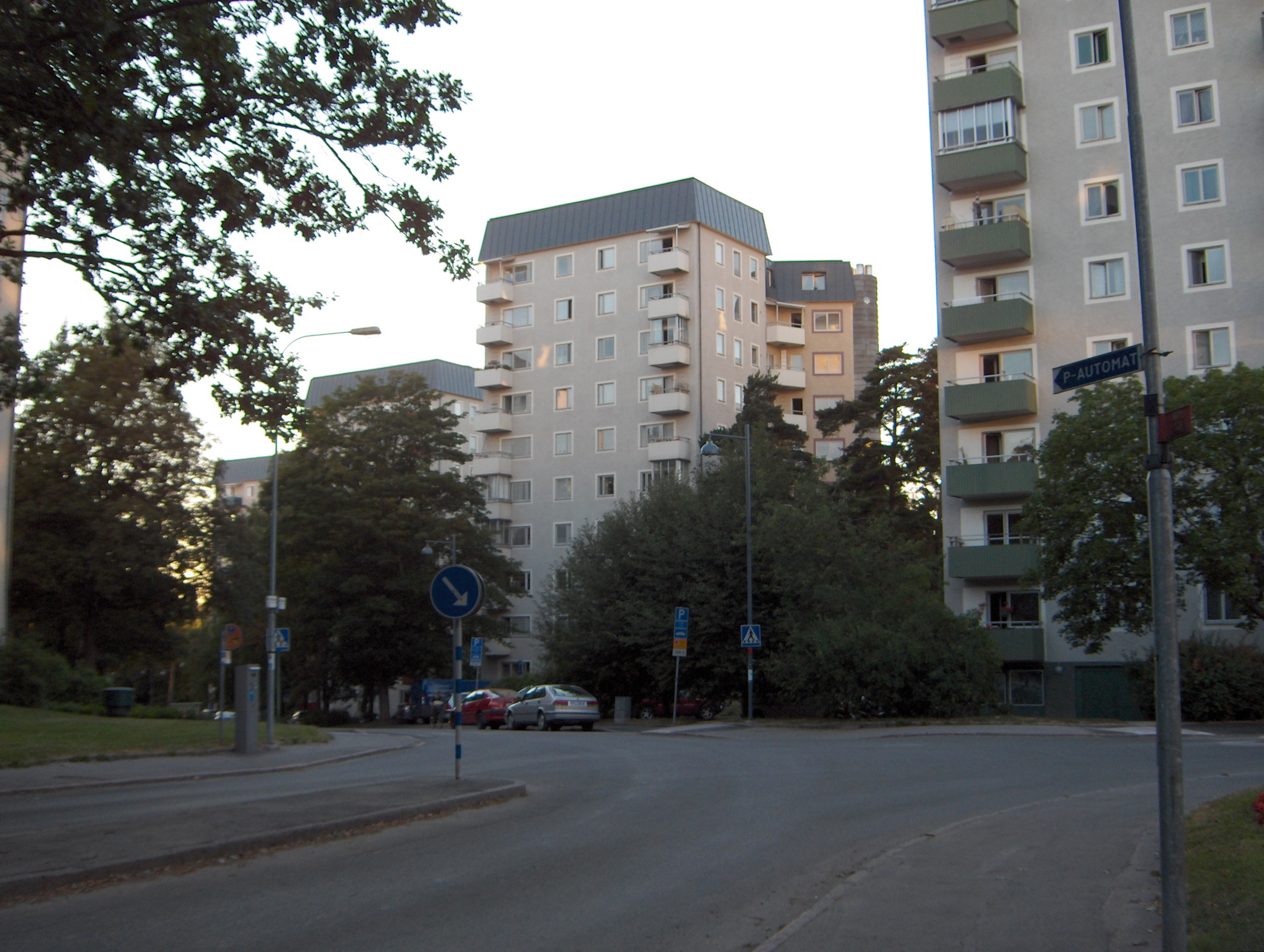

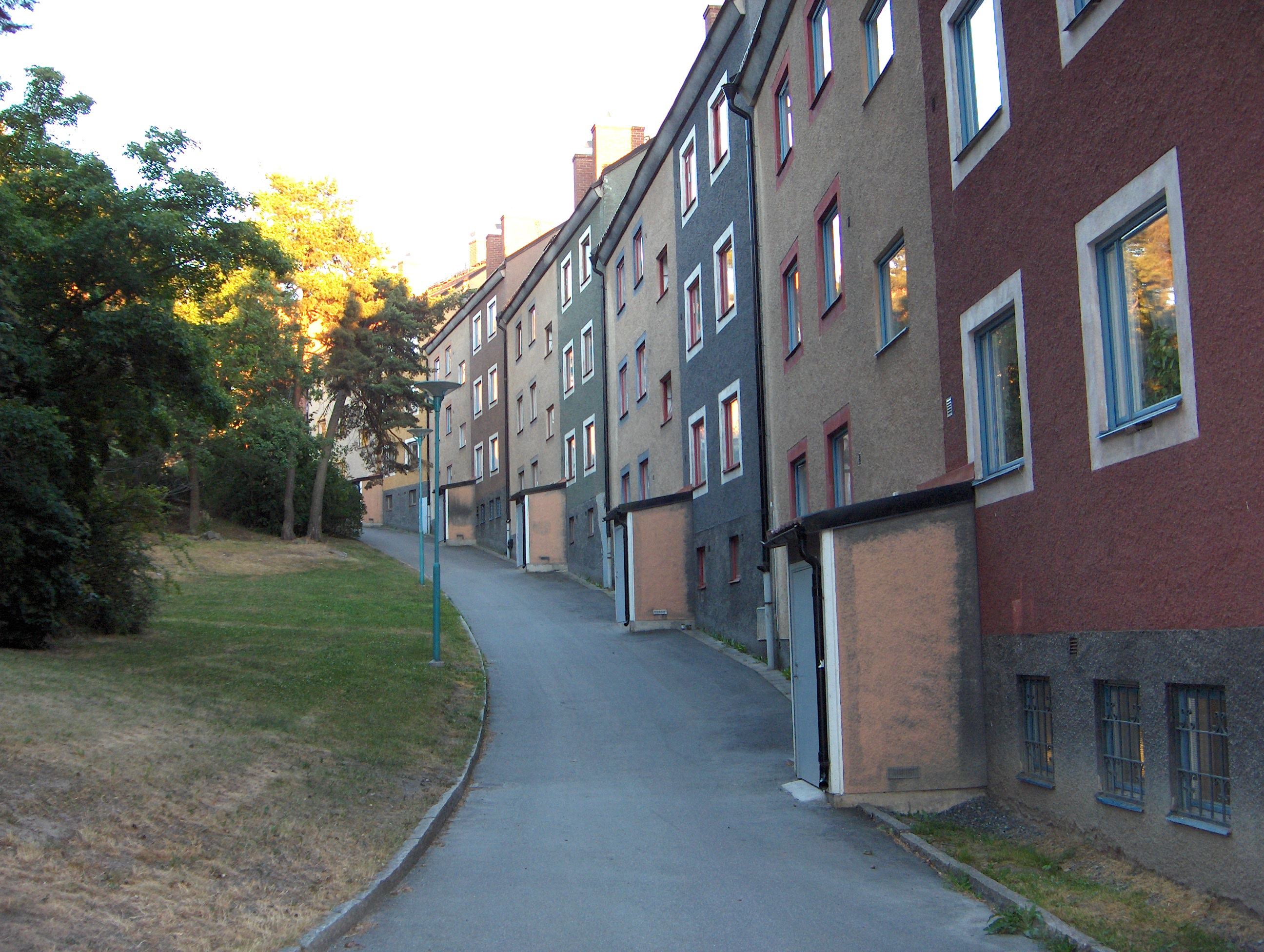

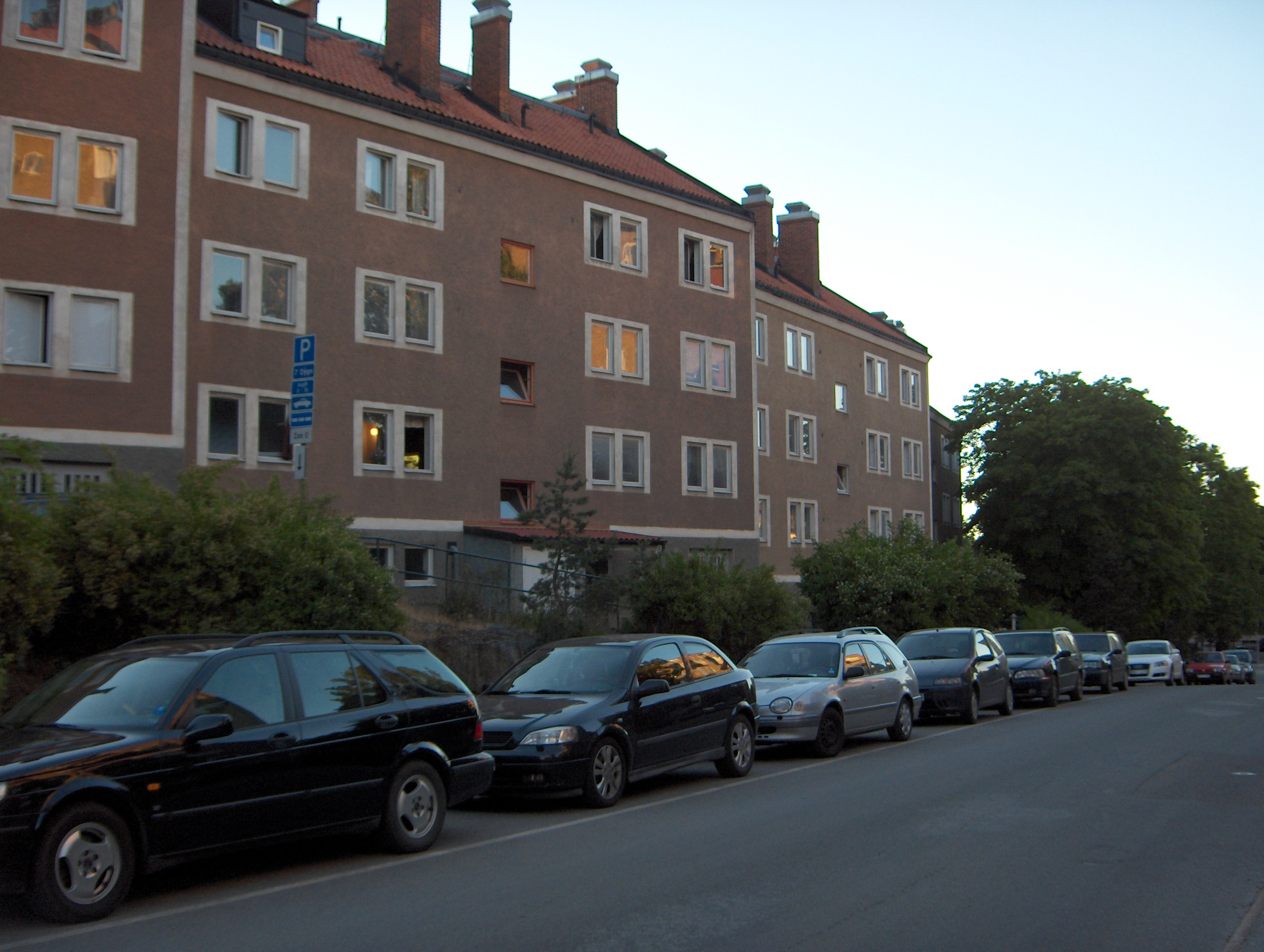

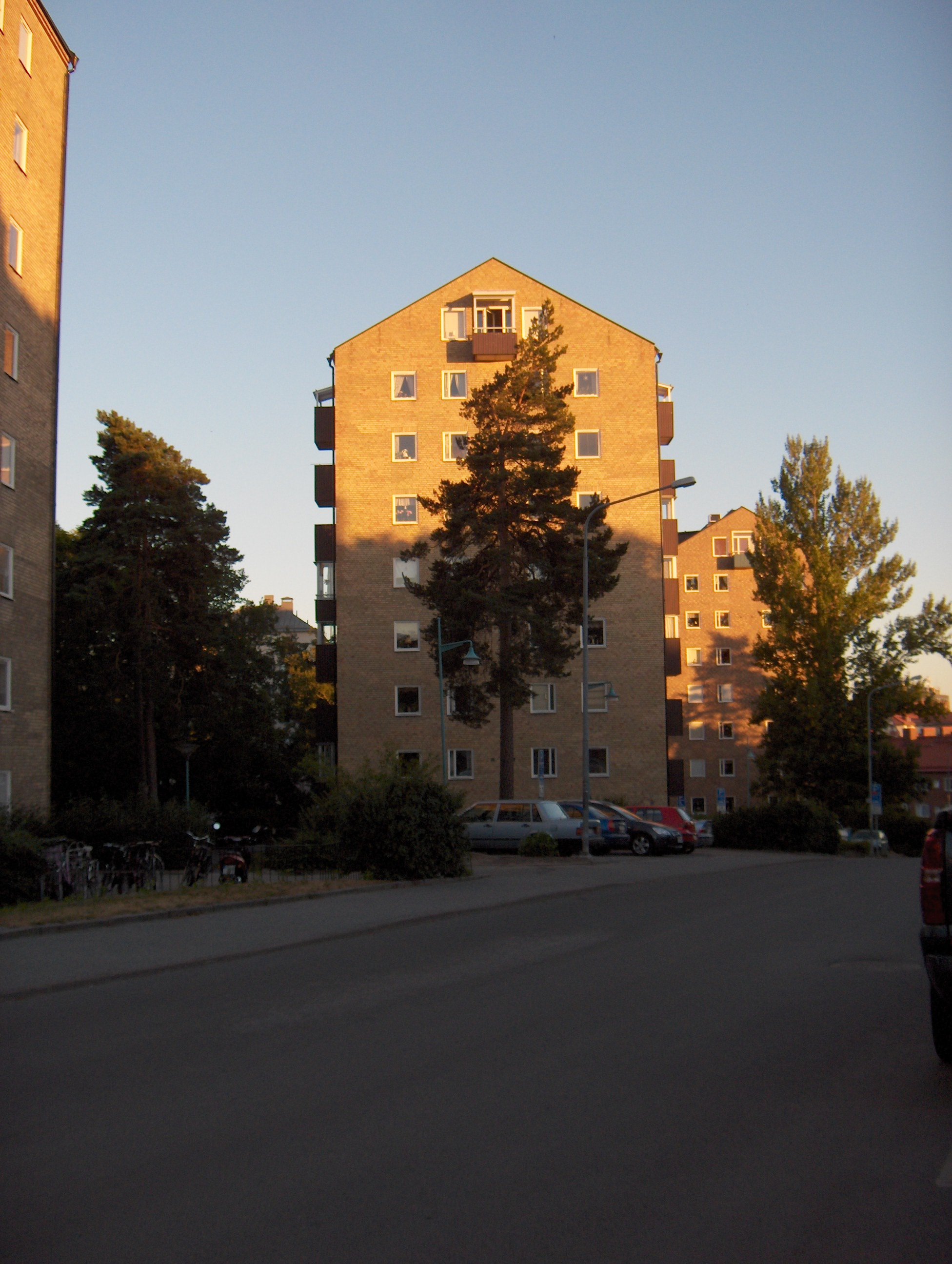
