= Stora Ursvik =

Urban district in Sundbybergs municipality, Sweden

Coordinates: 59°23′N 17°57′E

Stora Ursvik is a district in Sundbyberg Municipality with 2306 inhabitants (in 2019), and a suburb in the Stockholm metropolitan area. An unbuilt corner of the district is located in Stockholm Municipality. This residential area is under construction, with an estimated completion in 2026. The first people moved in during 2007. Before that it was farmland owned by the Oxenstierna family, then from the beginning of the 20th century by the Swedish military until 2005. It is connected to Lilla Ursvik to the east and the uninhabited Kymlinge to the north. It is separated by motorways from Rinkeby to the west and Rissne to the south. Two tram stations, on the Tvärbanan Kista line, are planned in the west of the district. The building plan for the district has low buildings (1-3 floors) in the north and east, and higher buildings in the south and west.

== Gallery ==
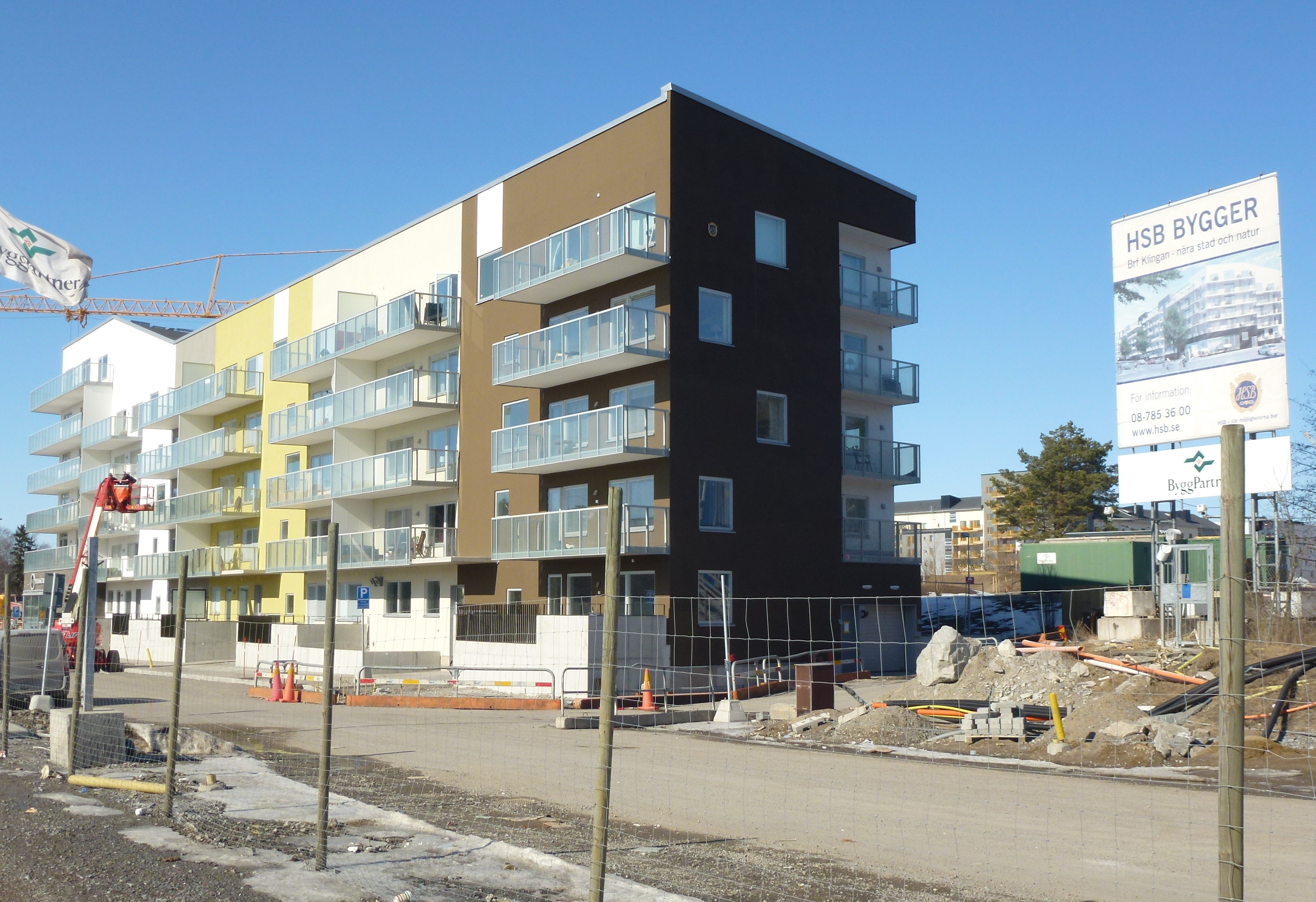

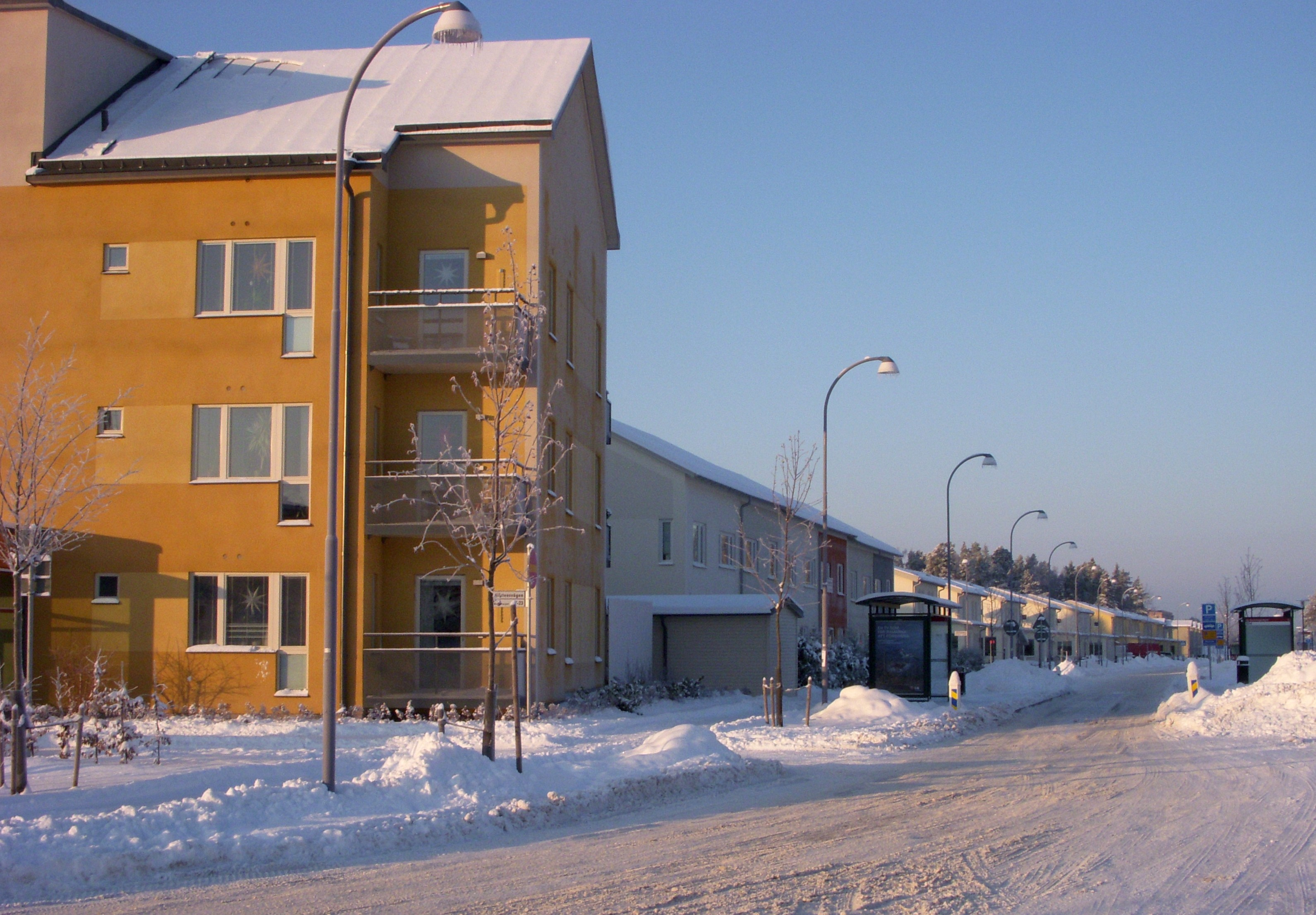

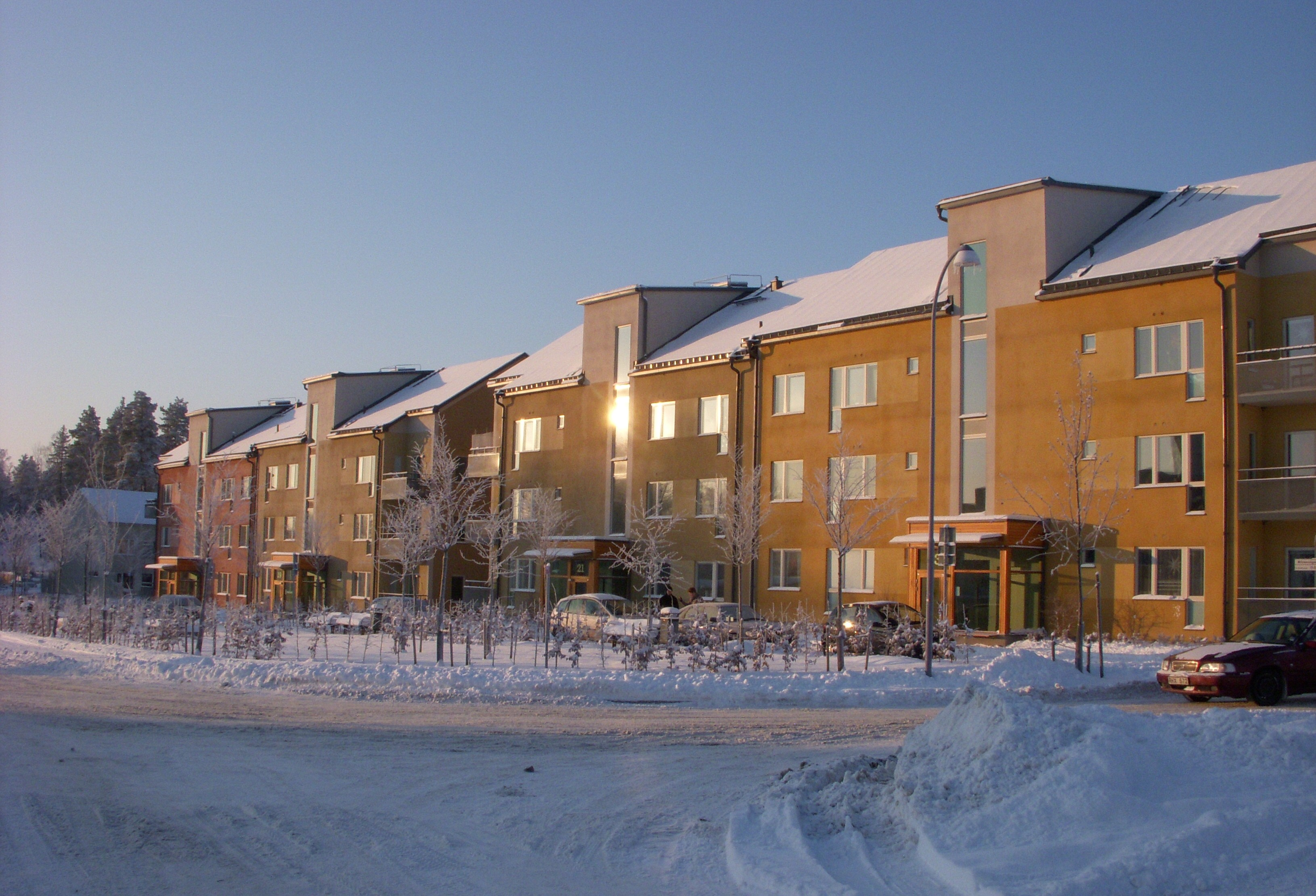

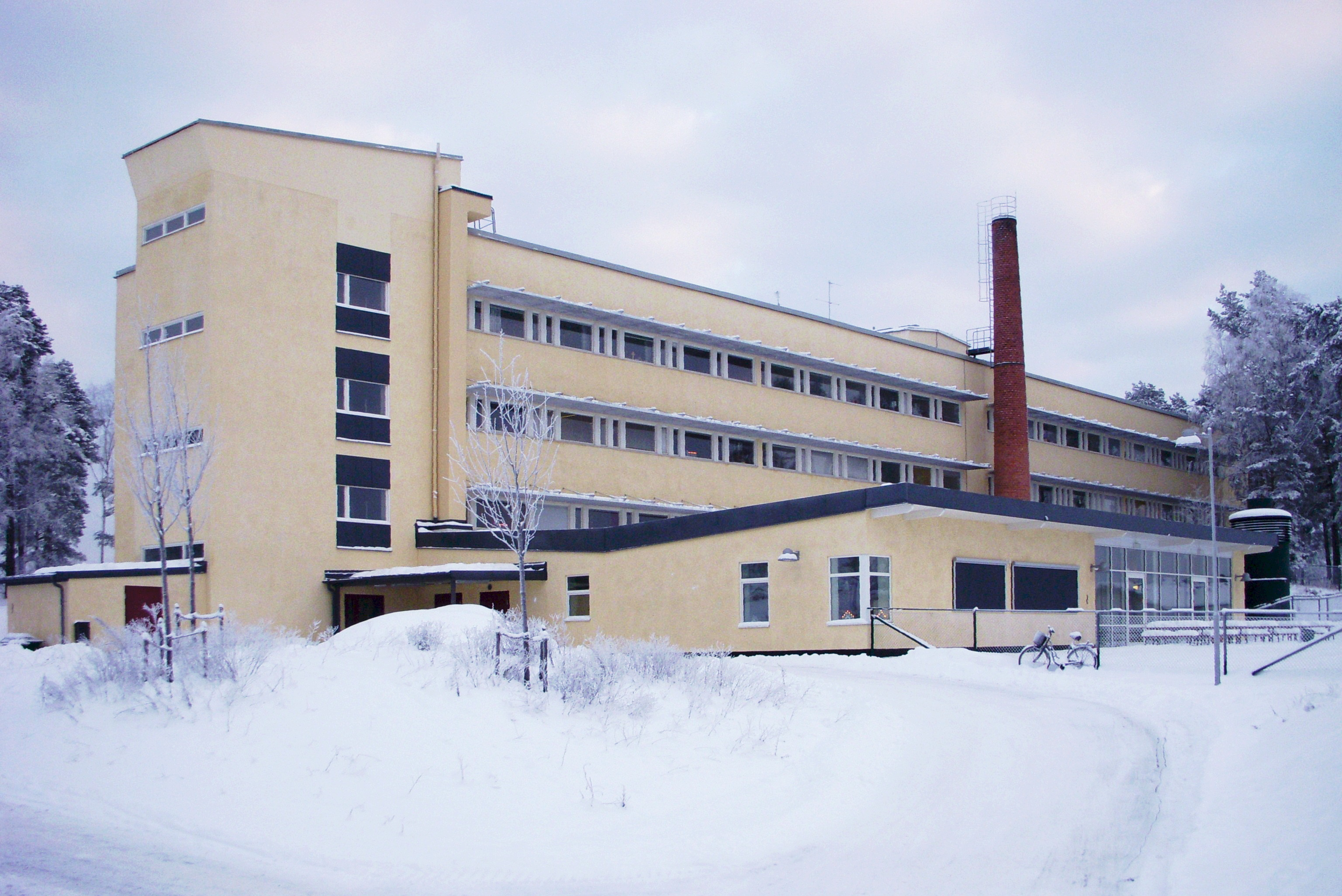
