= Råsunda (district) =

Urban district in Solna Municipality, Sweden

Coordinates: 59°21′53″N 17°59′41″E

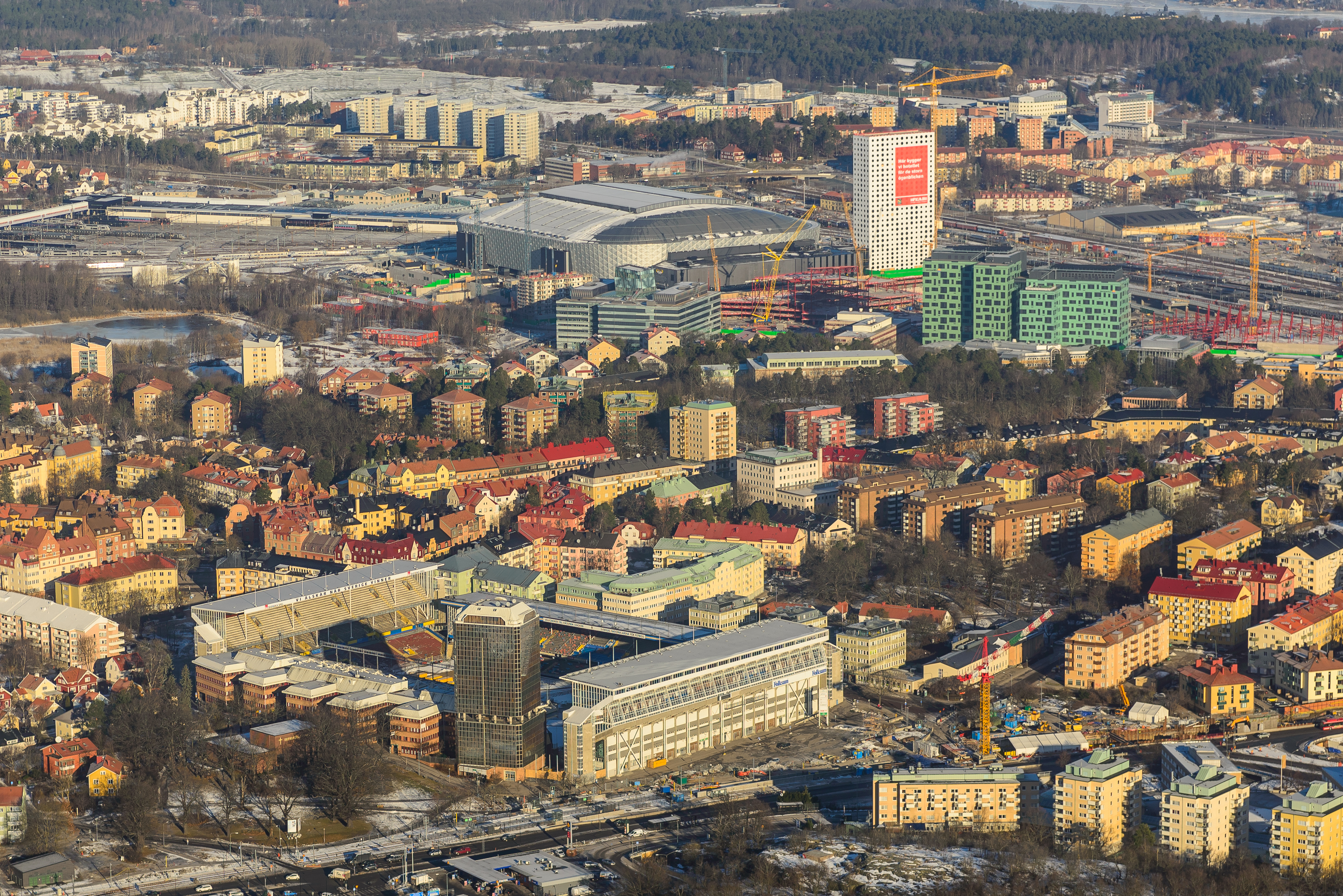
Råsunda in 2013, looking from the south

Råsunda is a district in Solna Municipality, and a suburb in the Stockholm metropolitan area with around 17,500 inhabitants. The movie industry set up in the area Filmstaden, formerly an ostrich farm, in 1919–1969 (nowadays the area has homes, offices) in western Råsunda. A large football stadium (Råsunda Stadium) stood in central Råsunda 1937–2003, on the grounds of a sports field that existed from 1910. Råsunda can be reached by the Näckrosen metro station (west part), Solna centrum metro and light rail station (south edge), the commuter train and light rail Solna railway station (east edge) and the major road Frösundaleden (south edge). The district neighbours Storskogen and Central Sundbyberg (both in Sundbyberg Municipality) to the west, Skytteholm to the south, Hagalund to the east and Järva the north. The lake Råstasjön is located to the north.
