= Lilla Alby =

Urban district in Sundbyberg municipality, Sweden

Coordinates: 59°21′28″N 17°58′13.5″E

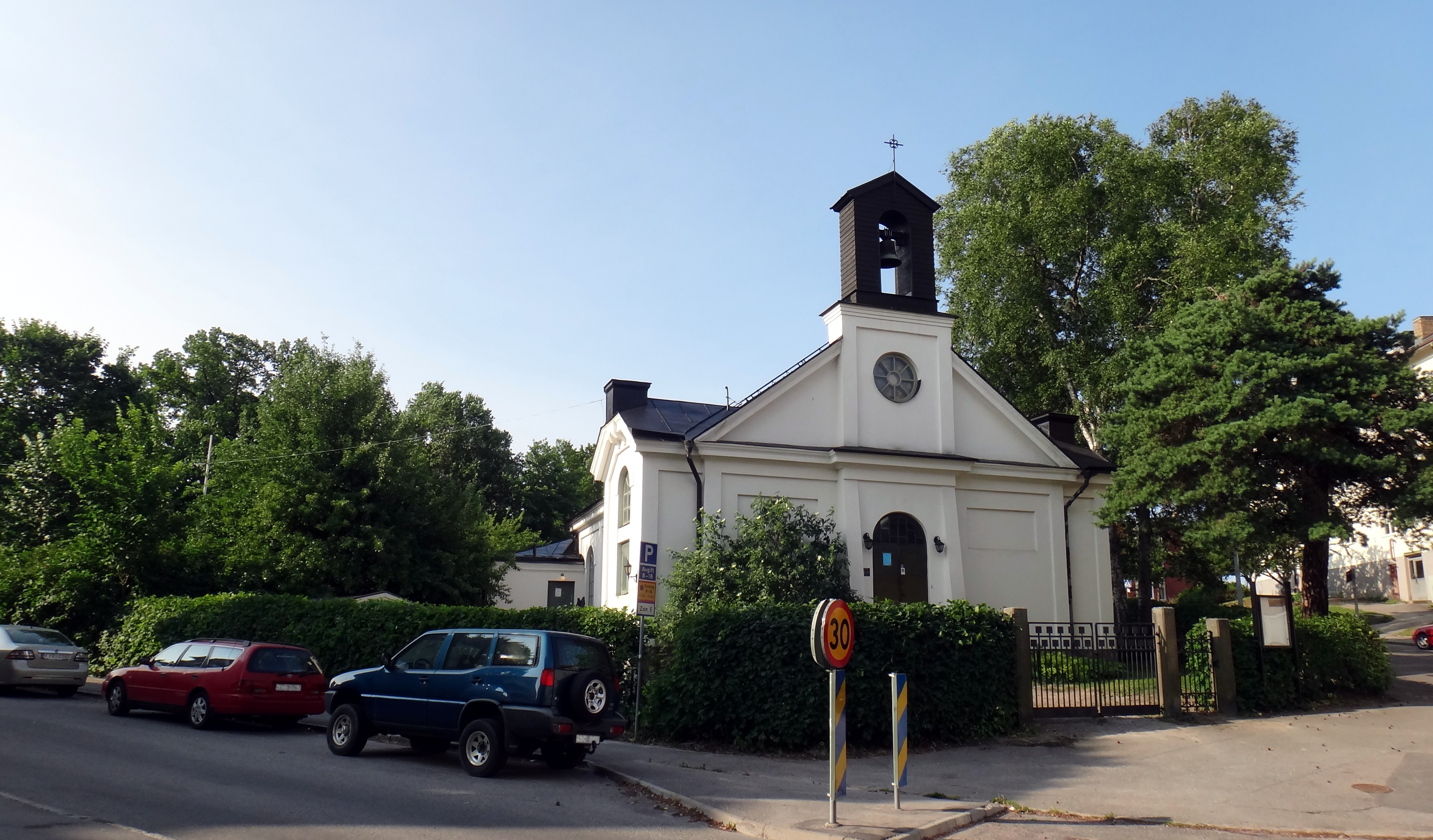
Alby church

Lilla Alby is a district in the southern corner of Sundbyberg Municipality, Sweden. It lies southwest of the railway Mälaren Line. It is separated from Bromma (Stockholm Municipality) by bay Bällstaviken (part of lake Mälaren) to the southwest, and borders Solna Municipality to the south and east, and Centrala Sundbyberg to the north. Lilla Alby has 4,235 citizens (as of 2013).

== History ==
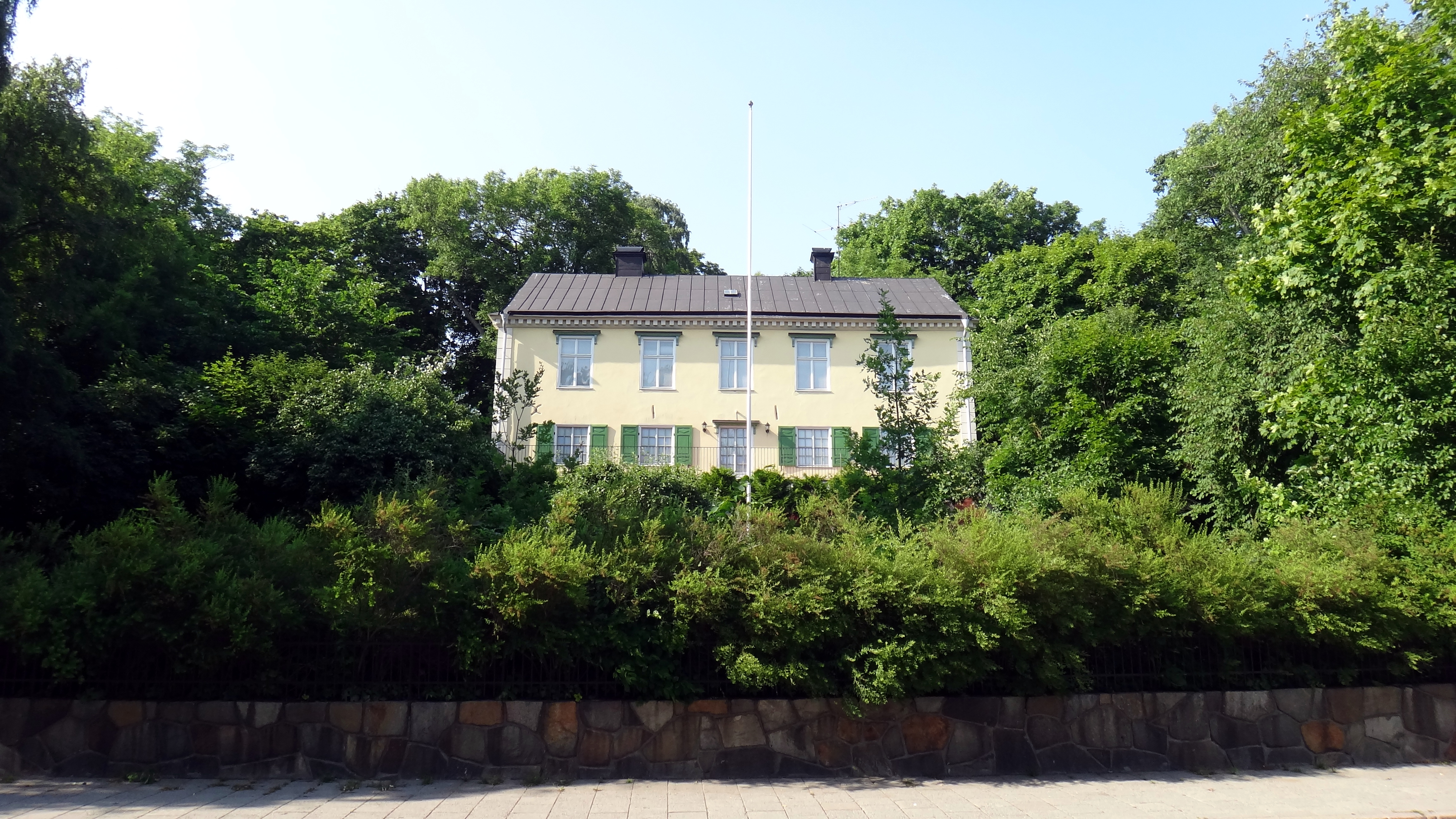
Ahlby säteri

The earliest account of the name Alby (meaning ”Alder village”) comes from 1553, referencing property of the church and local farmers. The farm Lilla Alby gård (”Little Alby farm”) was a part of greater farm complexes, mainly Huvudsta gård and Alby gård. A seat farm from the 1620s, called Ahlby säteri, is the oldest remaining building. The current Lilla Alby gård was built in 1833. When the train station was built in Sundbyberg in 1877, access to the area was greatly improved. The name Lilla Alby came into use in the late 1880s, when the land owner started selling pieces of the land for building homes and villas. On July 19, 1907, Lilla Alby municipalsamhälle was created within Solna landskommun. In 1943, Solna became a town, and Lilla Alby municipalsamhälle ceased to exist.

The current district was transferred from Solna to Sundbyberg in 1949. At the time, there were 2,810 people living on the 0.32 square kilometers of land.

== Buildings ==
Lilla Alby's oldest remaining building is Ahlby säteri, a seat farm from the 1620s. The church, Alby kyrka, was built in 1892 and is listed as a cultural heritage. It has been run by the Church of Sweden since 1934. In 2013, it was desacralized and sold to the adult education school MKFC Stockholms folkhögskola.

In 2014, the headquarter of Swedbank was moved to Lilla Alby. The office building lies in the eastern part of the district, next to the railway.

Lilla Alby is dominated by multi-family residential buildings. The number of homes is 2,557, of which 57 percent are rented, and 43 percent are owned co-operatively (2013). There were previously industrial buildings by the bay Bällstaviken, but they were torn down in favour of residential buildings in 2010.

There are two parks in Lilla Alby: Tuvan and Stamgårdsparken.

== Public transport ==
There is no metro station within Lilla Alby, but the southern part lies close to Solna strand, and the northern part lies close to Sundbybergs centrum, as well as the tram Tvärbanan and the railway station, which serves both commuter rail (on the Bålsta–Nynäshamn line) and regional rail (Stockholm–Västerås).

Map of Lilla Alby

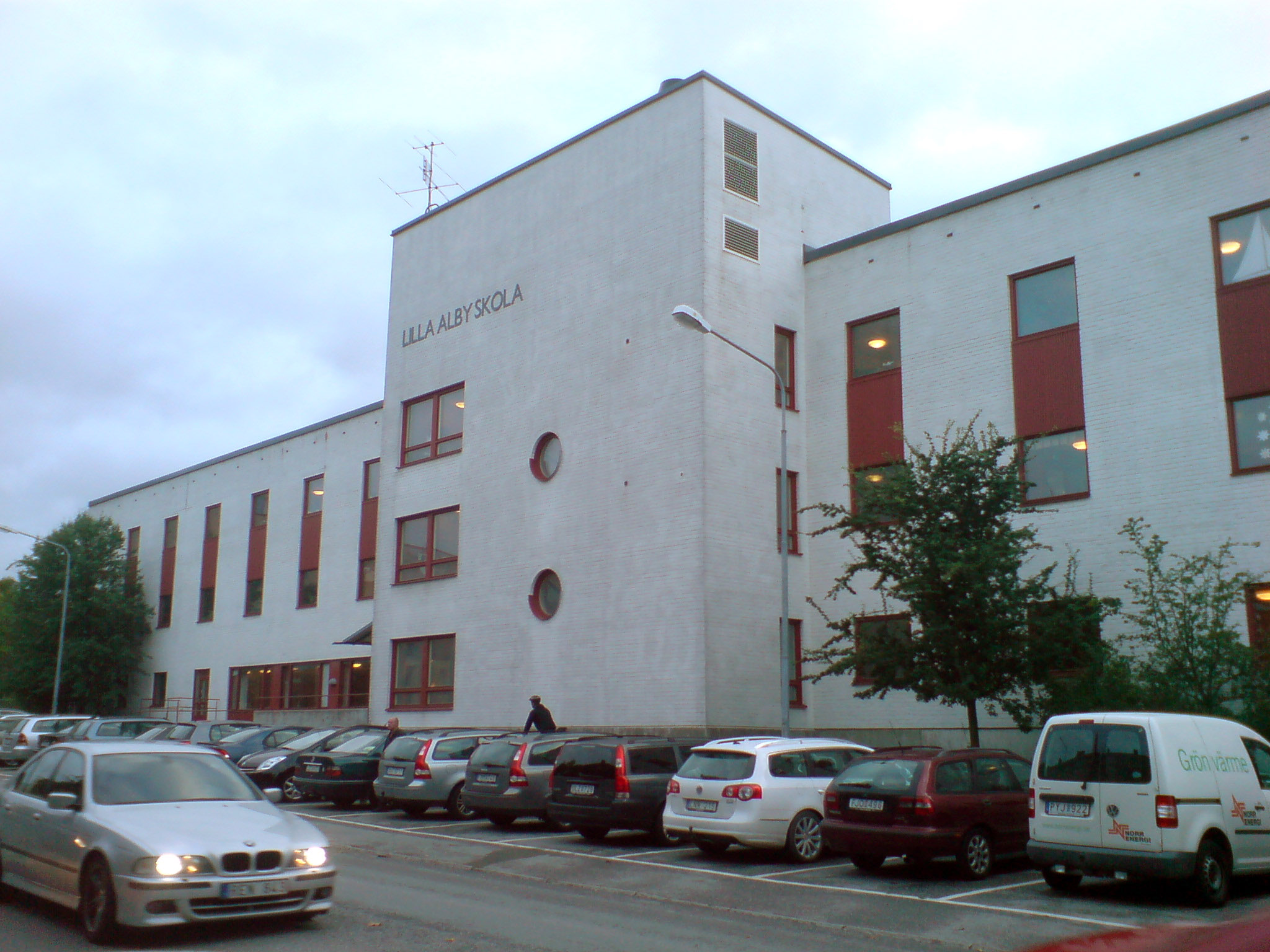
Lilla Alby school

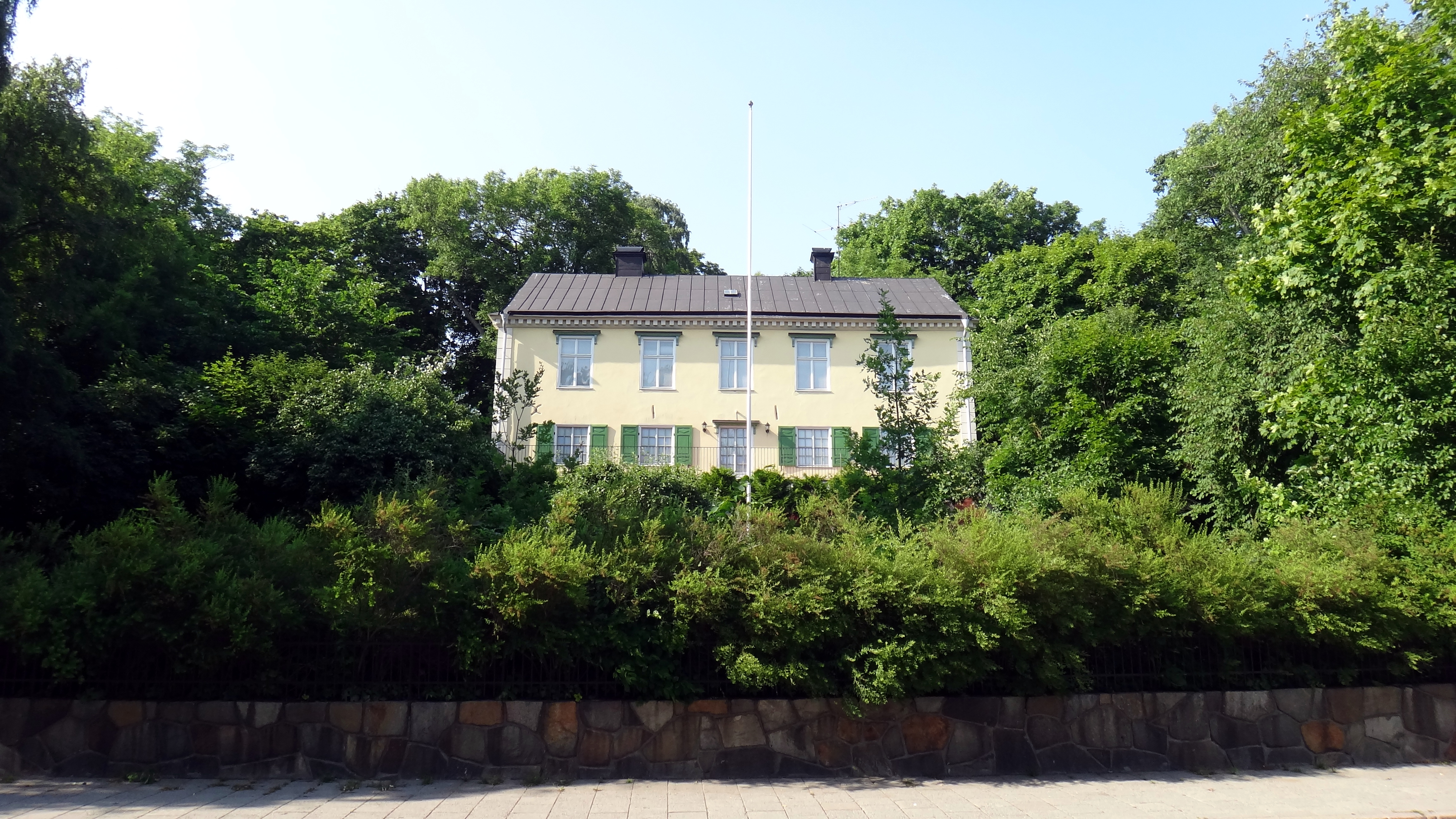
Ahlby säteri

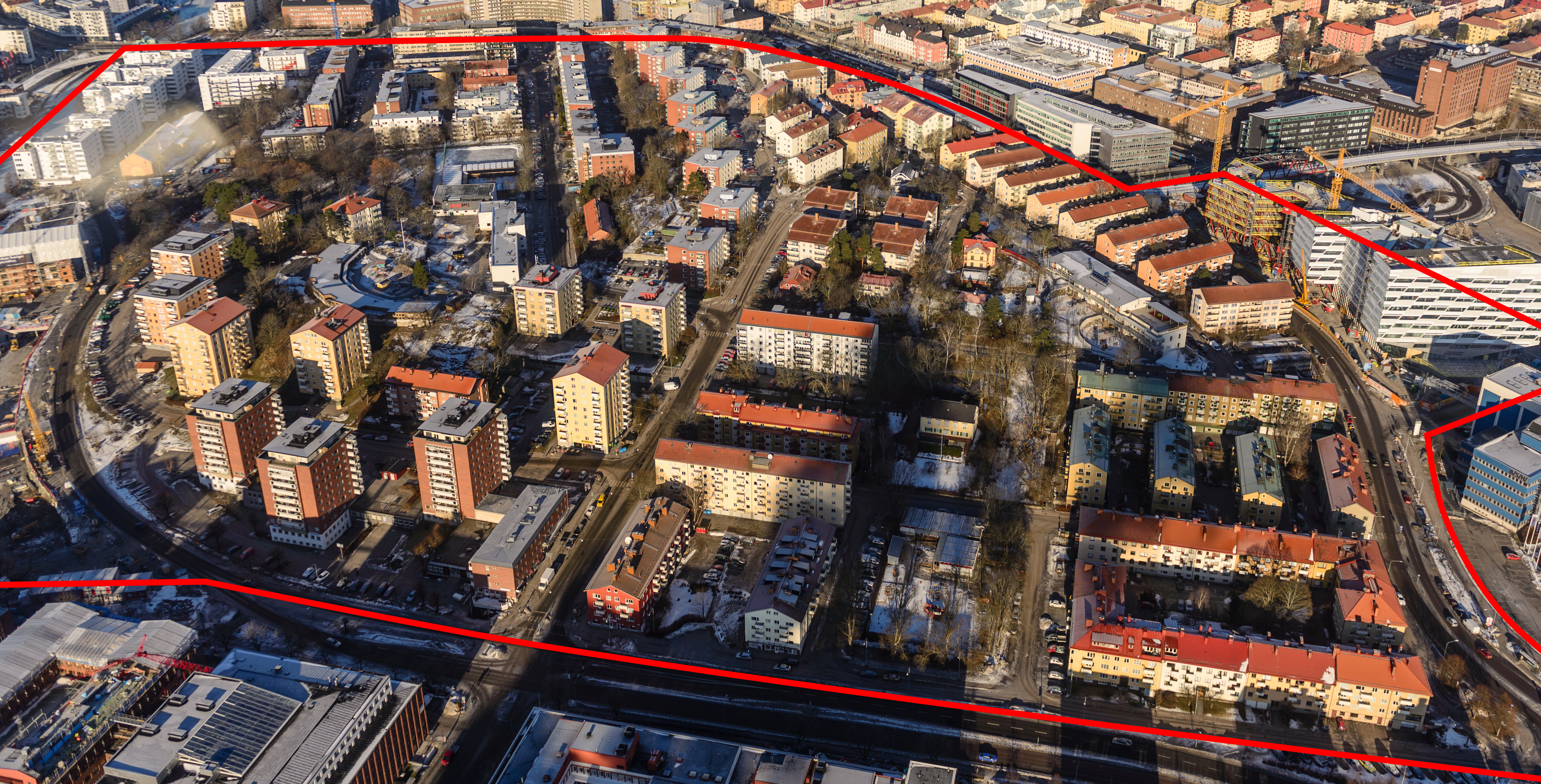
Aerial photo with district borders

== Demography ==
At the end of 2011, there were 4,235 people living in Lilla Alby, which is 10.7 percent of the municipality.
