= Lilla Ursvik =

Urban district in Sundbybergs municipality, Sweden

Coordinates: 59°22′55″N 17°57′40″E

Lilla Ursvik is a district in Sundbyberg Municipality with 1088 inhabitants (in 2019), and a suburb in the Stockholm metropolitan area. It is located between Stora Ursvik to the west, Kymlinge to the north and Järvastaden to the east, with a motorway separating it from Hallonbergen to the south. Gustaf de Laval had a workshop here 1894–1899. The area was bought in 1906 by the Graham Brothers company, which build a factory here. Freestanding homes for workers were built around the same time.
