= Sundbyberg Municipality =

City of Sundbyberg Sundbybergs stad
- Municipality
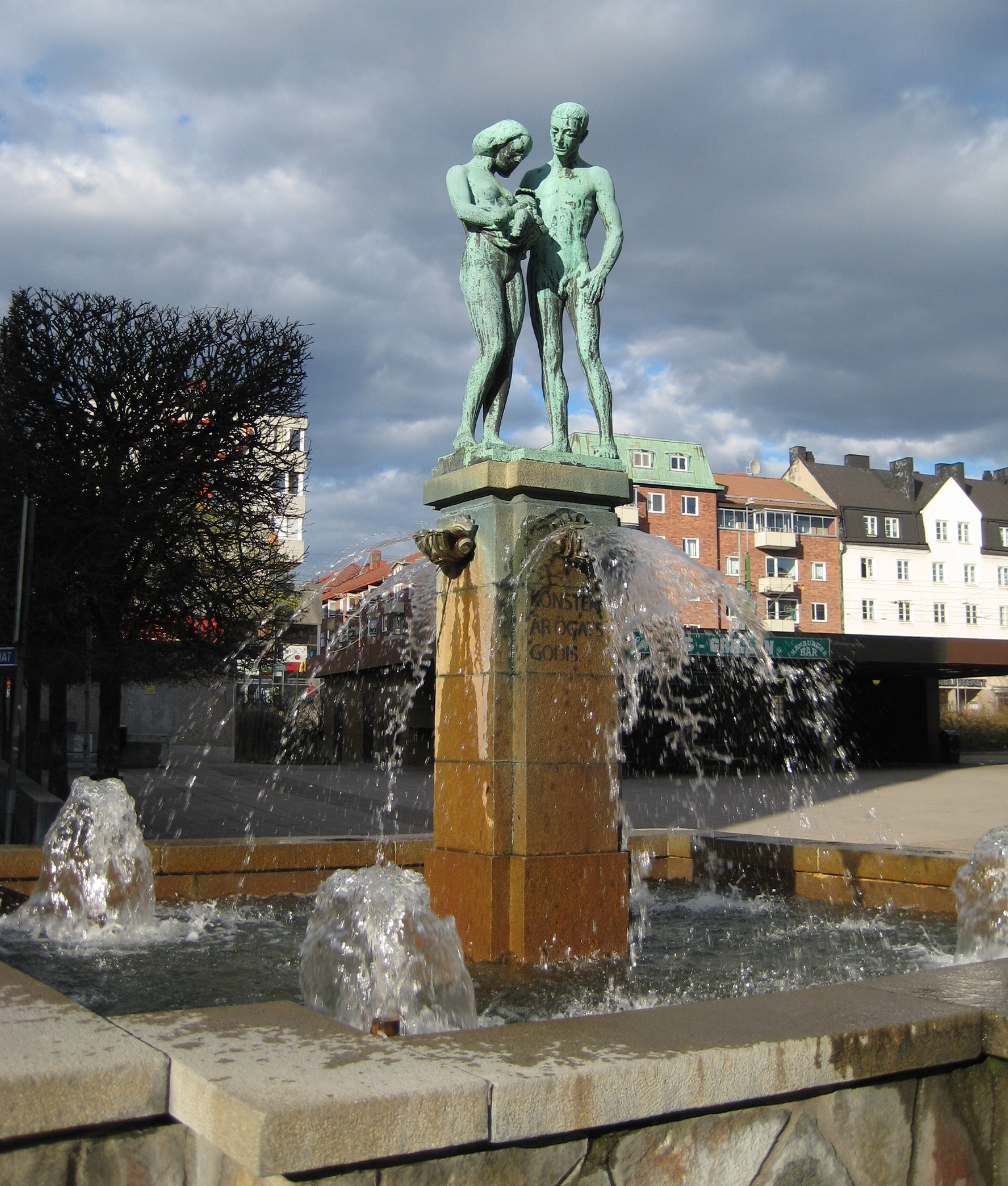
- Fountain on Sundbybergs torg (square) in Central Sundbyberg

- Coat of arms

- Coordinates: 59°22′N 17°58′E
- Country: Sweden
- County: Stockholm County
- Seat: Hallonbergen, part of Stockholm

Area
  - Total: 8.77 km^{2} (3.39 sq mi)
  - Land: 8.67 km^{2} (3.35 sq mi)
  - Water: 0.1 km^{2} (0.039 sq mi)
- Area as of 1 January 2014.

Population (30 June 2025)
  - Total: 56,846
  - Density: 6,560/km^{2} (17,000/sq mi)
- Demonyms: Sundbyberger; Sundbybergan; Sundbybergian
- Time zone: UTC+1 (CET)
  - Summer (DST): UTC+2 (CEST)
- ISO 3166 code: SE
- Province: Uppland
- Municipal code: 0183
- Website: www.sundbyberg.se
- Density is calculated using land area only.

Sundbyberg Municipality (Swedish: Sundbybergs kommun or Sundbybergs stad) is a municipality in Stockholm County in east central Sweden, just north of the capital Stockholm. Sundbyberg is wholly within the Stockholm urban area and has a 100% urban population.

Sundbyberg was detached from Bromma (which since 1916 is in Stockholm Municipality) in 1888 as a market town (köping). It got the title of a city in 1927. In 1949 parts of Solna Municipality and Spånga Municipality (when the rest of Spånga was amalgamated into Stockholm) were added. A proposed merger with Solna in 1971 was never implemented, making Sundbyberg, with an area of 8.83 square kilometres (3.41 mi^{2}), the smallest municipality in Sweden, but also the most densely populated. The municipality prefers to call itself a city, which, however, has no legal significance.

== History ==
Sundbyberg was for a long time only an area of small agriculture value and most of all used as a place to spend summer for rich families in the city. In 1863, almost the entire area was bought by Anders Petter Löfström, including Duvbo Estate, who began building houses there. In 1870, the first industrial plot was sold and from there the town did expand with railroad, houses, industries and community services of all kind. A. P. Löfström also donated to the municipality, all land for roads, streets, parks, school, church and other public areas.

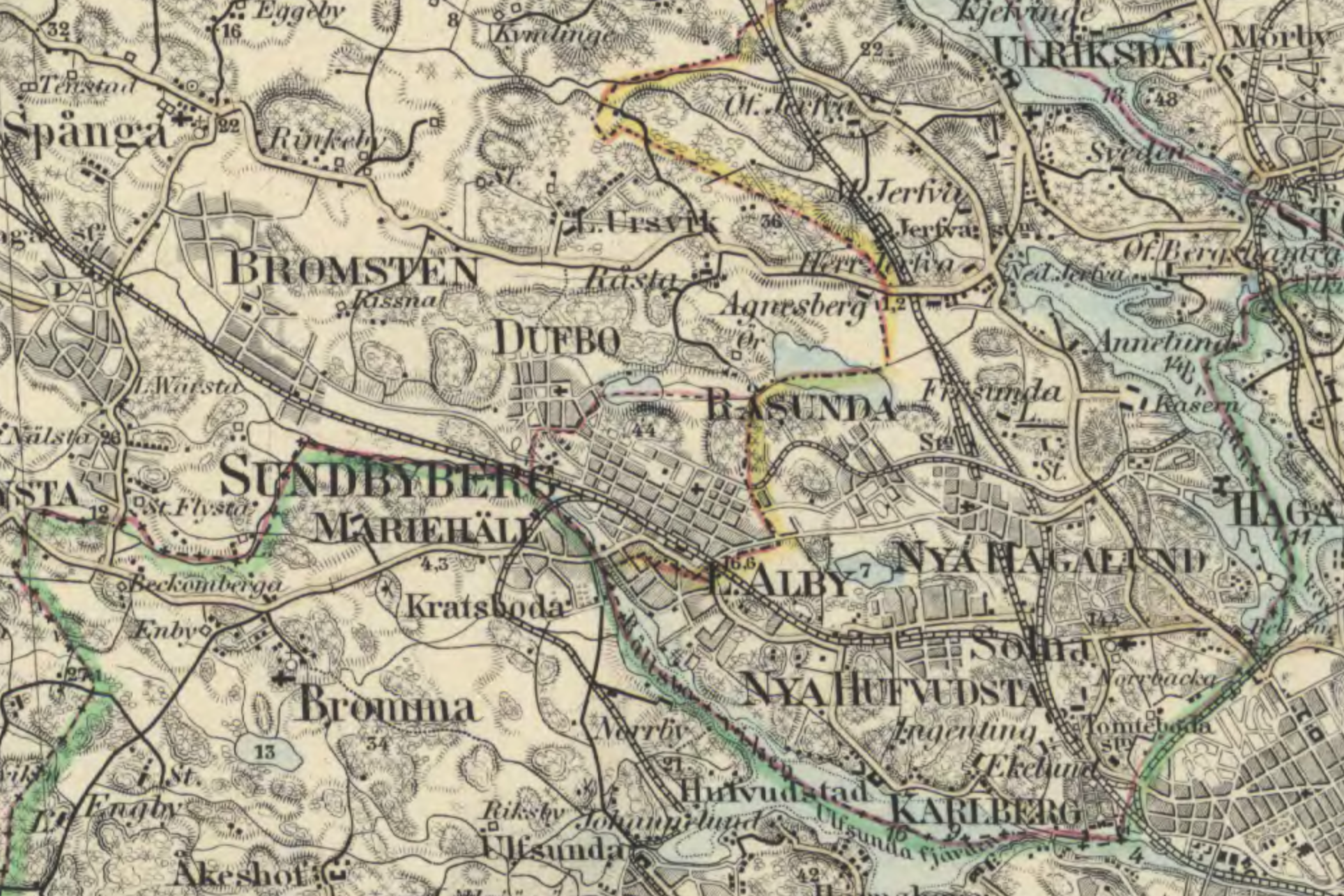
Sundbyberg and its surroundings in 1919

In 1888, Sundbyberg municipality was formed with 1,133 inhabitants, splitting off from Bromma. At the time the municipality only constituted Central Sundbyberg and the undeveloped Storskogen. Sundbyberg was known in its early years for its beer, its spirited political discourses, its muddy streets, and the danger of the streets at night (nowadays the crime-hit areas are Hallonbergen and Rissne instead). Sales of land was aimed at workers and industry, and the relative lack of public services caused a strong cooperative spirit to form. Suburbs bordering Sundbyberg were also built – Lilla Alby and Mariehäll in the 1880s and Duvbo around 1900. While trains stopped in Sundbyberg, they did so at a low frequency, and most commuters used the steam boat. In 1910 a tram line was built from Stockholm and Råsunda to the municipal border, and then into Sundbyberg in 1928, running until 1959.

A new city plan was established in 1941, prescribing the construction of lamellhus, rectangular multi-residential buildings with typically four floors, leading to the demolishment of most of the wooden houses in Sundbyberg in the 1940s, while brick or concrete buildings were kept. Many industrial buildings were converted to residential use at the same time. Rising housing prices led to a more densely built suburb than envisioned in the city plan, as well as cause Sundbyberg to rapidly lose its industrial character.

In 1946 Sundbyberg municipality, which by then had 15,000 inhabitants, bought Storskogen, with the first homes going up there in 1952. In 1949 Spånga municipality was split between neighbouring municipalities, giving Duvbo, Ursvik and some other land to Sundbyberg. Lilla Alby was transferred from Solna municipality to Sundbyberg at the same time. Since the 1950s when Storskogen was built, Sundbyberg has expanded one district each decade, with Ör built in the 1960s, Hallonbergen and its Metro line (which also serves Storskogen and Ör) in the 1970s, Rissne and its Metro line (which also serves Central Sundbyberg and Lilla Alby) in the 1980s, Brotorp and Stora Ursvik in the 2000s.

== Economy ==
The roughly 50,000 inhabitants live in about 20,000 households. The industrial policy of the municipality is to provide one job opportunity for every household, with there being around 23,000 jobs in the municipality (in 2015). So unlike other municipalities in Metropolitan Stockholm, Sundbyberg is not a bedroom suburb wherefrom people commute to Stockholm, but also a place commuted to from outside. In total, 19,000 commuters travel in each direction to or from Sundbyberg every day (in 2014). The unemployment rate in Sundbyberg closely tracks the average for Stockholm County and is generally lower than the Swedish average.

In the first half of its existence, Sundbyberg saw a strong expansion of industrial activity, and most residents were industrial workers, but in the 1940s the industry almost entirely disappeared from Sundbyberg. By the 1970s warehouses and IT businesses had established themselves instead, and an attempt to establish industry in Hallonbergen had failed due to high rental costs. Today the service sector dominates, with Sundbyberg having become a place with office workers, as a result of Sundbyberg becoming more central as Stockholm has expanded and public transport has been strengthened. The most common professions for people working in Sundbyberg are (in order from most employed): IT developer, banker, human relations, secretary, business seller/purchaser, accountant, retail clerk, truck/bus driver, teacher, tax collector. There are office districts in Central Sundbyberg (Sundbyberg centrum and Allén), Rissne (Ursviks Entré) and Hallonbergen (Sundby Park). In 2015 Sundbyberg centrum offices had rents (2,100 kr/m^{2}/year) similar to Kista, Alvik and the adjacent Solna Business Park, while in Allén they a bit lower and similar to Lidingö Centrum and the nearby Solna Strand, and Ursviks Entré and Sundby Park both have further lower office rents similar to Farsta and Tyresö Centrum.

Unusually for Stockholm suburbs, Sundbyberg has a proper town centre, with plenty of nice shops in the Central Sundbyberg area, which makes the little city a bit independent. There are also smaller concentrations of stores elsewhere in the municipality, such as by the Rissne and Hallonbergen metro stations. The proximity of the shopping centres Bromma Blocks (1 km away) and Mall of Scandinavia (2 km away) has hindered establishment of a shopping centre in Central Sundbyberg. Businesses in Hallonbergen suffer from getting few customers from elsewhere due to the area's poor reputation, whereas the area's locals don't mind going elsewhere, e.g. to cafés in Central Sundbyberg.

== Demography ==
=== Population growth ===
Population growth in Sundbyberg Municipality 1970–2020
Year	Population
1970	28,085
1975	26,995
1980	25,717
1985	28,516
1990	31,308
1995	31,803
2000	33,868
2005	34,016
2010	38,633
2015	46,110
2019	52,414
2020	52,669

=== 2022 by district ===
This is a demographic table based on Sundbyberg Municipality's electoral districts in the 2022 Swedish general election sourced from SVT's election platform, in turn taken from SCB official statistics.

In total there were 53,431 residents, including 38,222 Swedish citizens of voting age. 56.1% voted for the left coalition and 42.2% for the right coalition. Indicators are in percentage points except population totals and income.

Location	Residents	Citizen adults	Left vote	Right vote	Employed	Swedish parents	Foreign heritage	Income SEK	Degree
Location			%	%					
Brotorp/Kymlinge	2,188	1,299	53.3	45.9	88	64	36	38,888	74
Centrala Sbg 1	2,081	1,715	52.8	46.3	86	67	33	34,739	64
Centrala Sbg 2	1,420	1,213	51.1	48.0	85	75	25	31,602	57
Centrala Sbg 3	1,623	1,307	54.1	44.7	83	72	28	31,409	57
Centrala Sbg 4	1,203	1,014	54.2	44.7	85	75	25	31,330	61
Centrala Sbg 5	1,744	1,440	55.8	43.1	85	76	24	33,013	64
Centrala Sbg 6	1,676	1,345	54.7	44.3	86	77	23	32,902	59
Centrala Sbg 7	1,296	1,051	54.0	44.7	83	73	27	30,722	63
Duvbo 1	1,435	1,061	50.0	48.9	83	75	25	33,582	59
Duvbo 2	1,439	1,059	45.6	54.1	84	79	21	37,112	69
Hallonbergen 1	2,472	1,503	63.5	33.5	70	22	78	21,480	42
Hallonbergen 2	2,011	1,138	67.3	28.7	63	19	81	18,314	34
Hallonbergen 3	1,700	1,091	68.2	28.9	68	19	81	19,235	35
Lilla Alby 1	1,949	1,532	53.9	44.5	85	72	28	31,456	57
Lilla Alby 2	1,991	1,559	54.8	44.0	84	70	30	33,106	60
Lilla Alby 3	1,462	1,226	48.5	51.0	89	81	19	39,377	68
Lilla Alby 4	1,755	1,404	52.6	46.1	85	68	32	34,680	62
Lilla Ursvik	1,077	738	48.9	50.3	85	73	27	36,365	63
Rissne 1	2,428	1,536	60.0	36.4	77	41	59	26,343	45
Rissne 2	2,393	1,666	64.5	32.8	75	36	64	24,882	43
Rissne 3	1,866	1,150	66.0	32.6	71	27	73	24,263	48
Rissne 4	1,836	1,268	67.0	30.1	72	37	63	23,795	35
Stora Ursvik 1	1,688	977	50.2	47.8	87	68	32	39,810	74
Stora Ursvik 2	1,771	1,089	60.5	37.5	84	37	63	31,254	61
Stora Ursvik 3	1,638	1,002	59.5	36.8	80	39	61	27,666	47
Stora Ursvik 4	2,152	1,401	59.2	39.5	86	48	52	33,753	66
Storskogen 1	1,574	1,371	57.9	40.2	76	68	32	24,384	43
Storskogen 2	1,564	1,230	53.8	44.8	83	63	37	31,041	58
Tulemarken	1,675	1,298	54.0	44.9	86	76	24	34,892	64
Ör	2,324	1,539	59.7	37.9	77	47	53	24,379	43
Source: SVT

=== Residents with a foreign background ===
On 31 December 2017 the number of people with a foreign background (persons born outside of Sweden or with two parents born outside of Sweden) was 20 229, or 40.93% of the population (49 424 on 31 December 2017). On 31 December 2002 the number of residents with a foreign background was (per the same definition) 8 531, or 25.24% of the population (33 797 on 31 December 2002). On 31 December 2017 there were 49 424 residents in Sundbyberg, of which 14 954 people (30.26%) were born in a country other than Sweden. Divided by country in the table below - the Nordic countries as well as the 12 most common countries of birth outside of Sweden for Swedish residents have been included, with other countries of birth bundled together by continent by Statistics Sweden.

Country of birth
31 December 2017
1	Sweden	34,470
2	Asia: Other countries	2,002
3	European Union: Other countries	1,770
4	Iran	1,394
5	Africa: Other countries	1,393
6	Eritrea	1,270
7	Finland	1,047
8	Syria	992
9	Iraq	842
10	Poland	745
11	South America	665
12	Europe outside of the EU: other countries	586
13	Turkey	333
14	North America	286
15	Somalia	267
16	Thailand	263
17	Germany	213
18	Bosnia and Herzegovina	211
19	Yugoslavia / Serbia and Montenegro	165
20	Norway	163
21	Afghanistan	138
22	Denmark	77
23	Soviet Union	51
24	Oceania	39
25	Iceland	38
26	Unknown country of birth	4

=== By district ===
District	Population 2020	New homes planned 2021-2034	Housing tenure 2018 rental/coop/house	Higher education of 20-64yo 2018	Foreign born 2010	Sickness days/year 2010
Stora Ursvik	6 706	4 963	31%/56%/14%	59%	20%	15
Lilla Ursvik	1 069	0	0%/22%/78%	59%	20%	15
Brotorp/Järvastaden	2 175	475	0%/30%/70%	59%	20%	15
Rissne	8 601	1 425	69%/29%/2%	37%	50%	30
Hallonbergen	5 984	3 133	70%/30%/0%	30%	67%	38
Ör	2 298	846	47%/53%/0%	36%	32%	31
Duvbo	2 212	0	35%/22%/42%	59%	18%	15
Central Sundbyberg	14 585	1 170	56%/42%/1%	54%	20%	22
Storskogen	3 067	47	73%/26%/1%	43%	21%	29
Lilla Alby	5 946	230	56%/43%/0%	51%	24%	24
Other	138	-		Sweden: 44%	Sweden: 20%	Sweden: 25

== Public transport ==
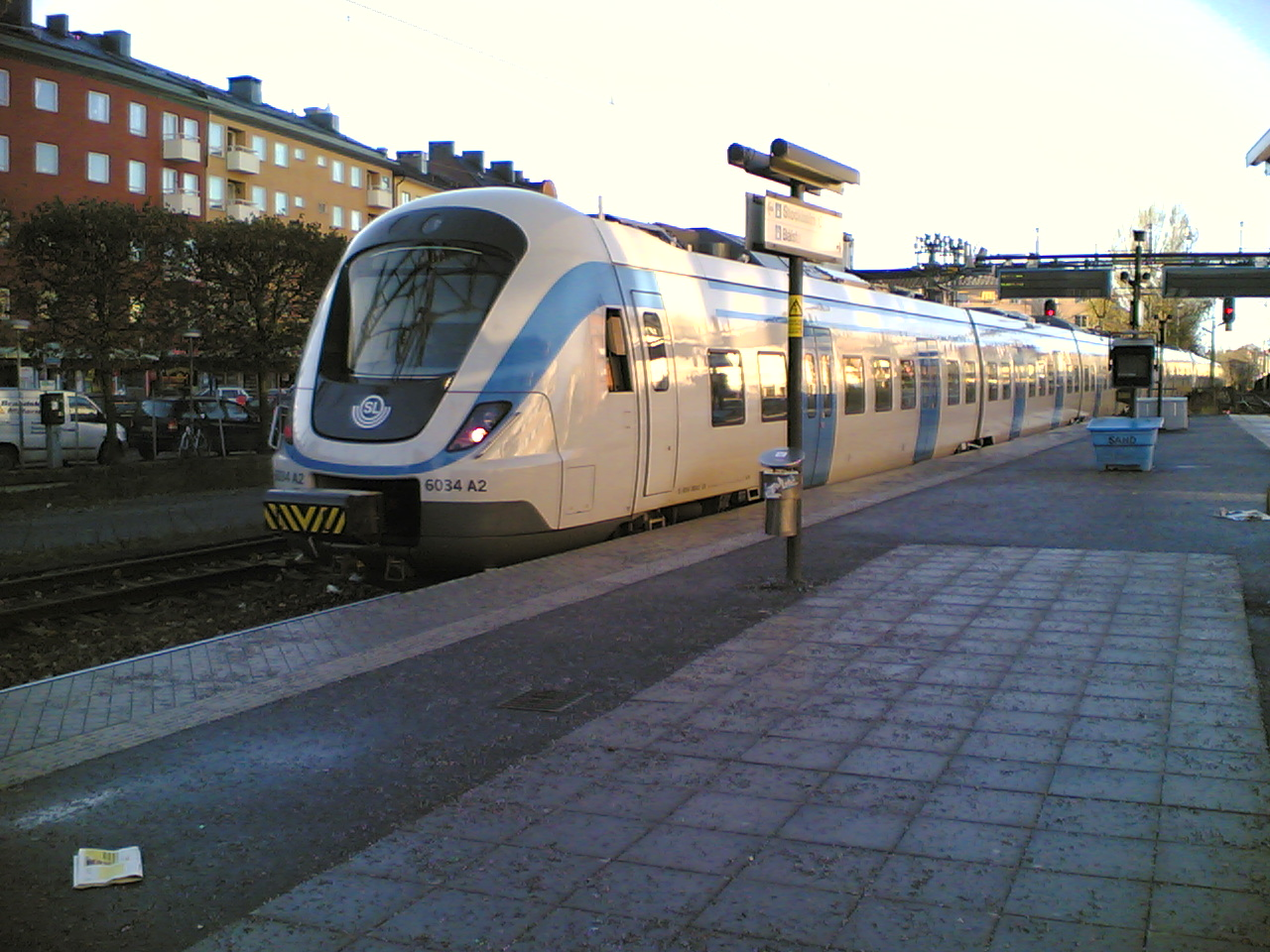
Commuter train at Sundbyberg station

Sundbyberg is well served by the Stockholm public transport system. There are several metro stations as well as one train station and plenty of bus routes. Even some main line trains call at Sundbyberg. The Tvärbanan light rail service was extended from Sickla Udde via Alvik to Solna centrum in October 2013. The line runs through Central Sundbyberg with tracks laid in the street and has two stops within the municipality. Construction of a northern light railway branch from Ulvsunda to Kista that will pass through Rissne and Stora Ursvik started in 2018.

== Districts ==

- Brotorp
- Central Sundbyberg
- Duvbo
- Hallonbergen
- Lilla Alby
- Lilla Ursvik
- Kymlinge
- Rissne
- Stora Ursvik
- Storskogen
- Ör

== Sports ==
The following sports clubs are located in Sundbyberg:

- Sundbybergs IK
- Storskogens SK

== Gallery ==
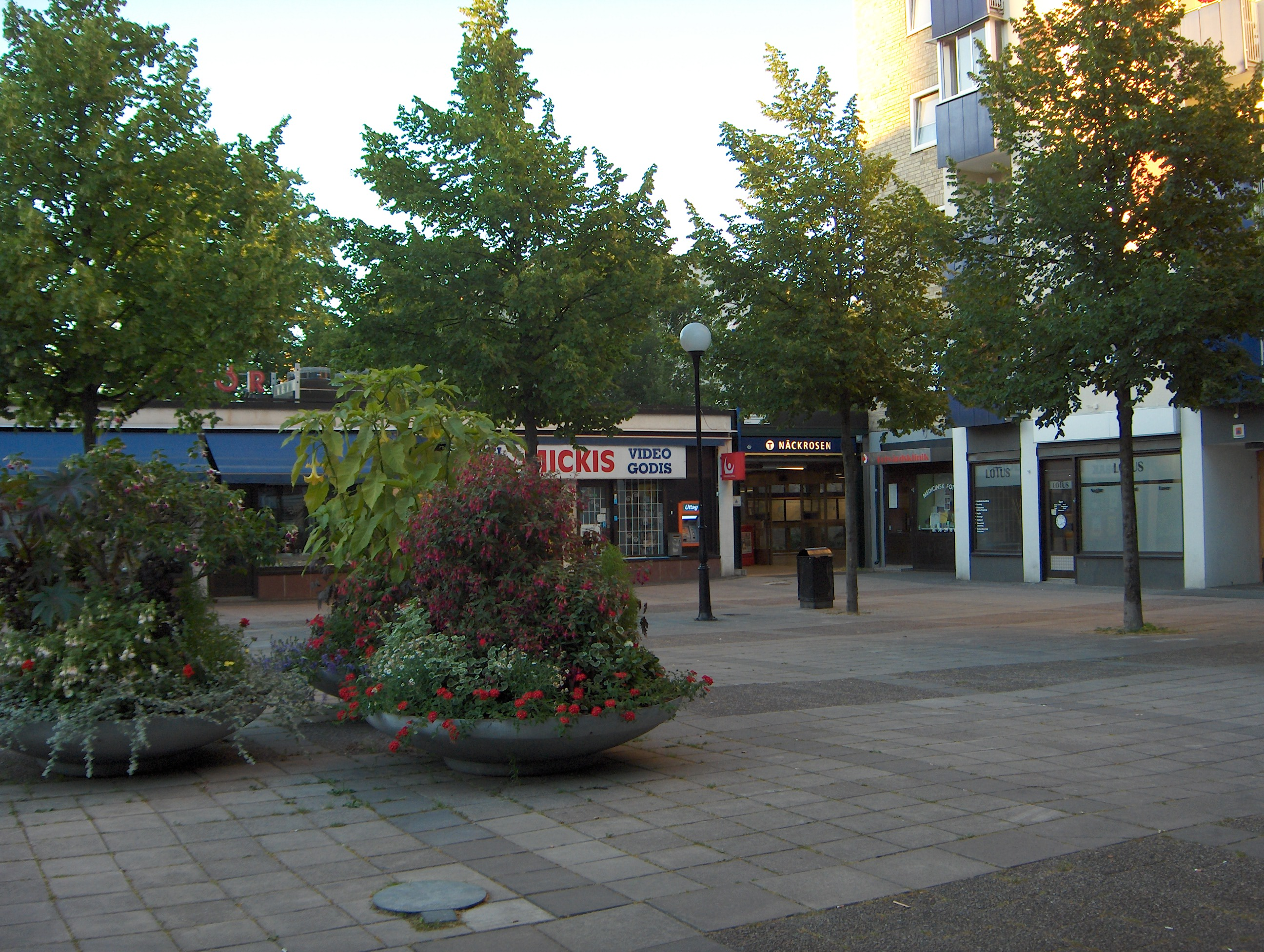
Storskogstorget, a square in Storskogen

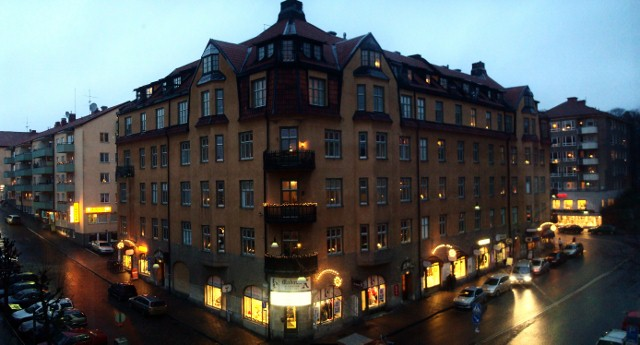
Apartment block from 1911 in Central Sundbyberg

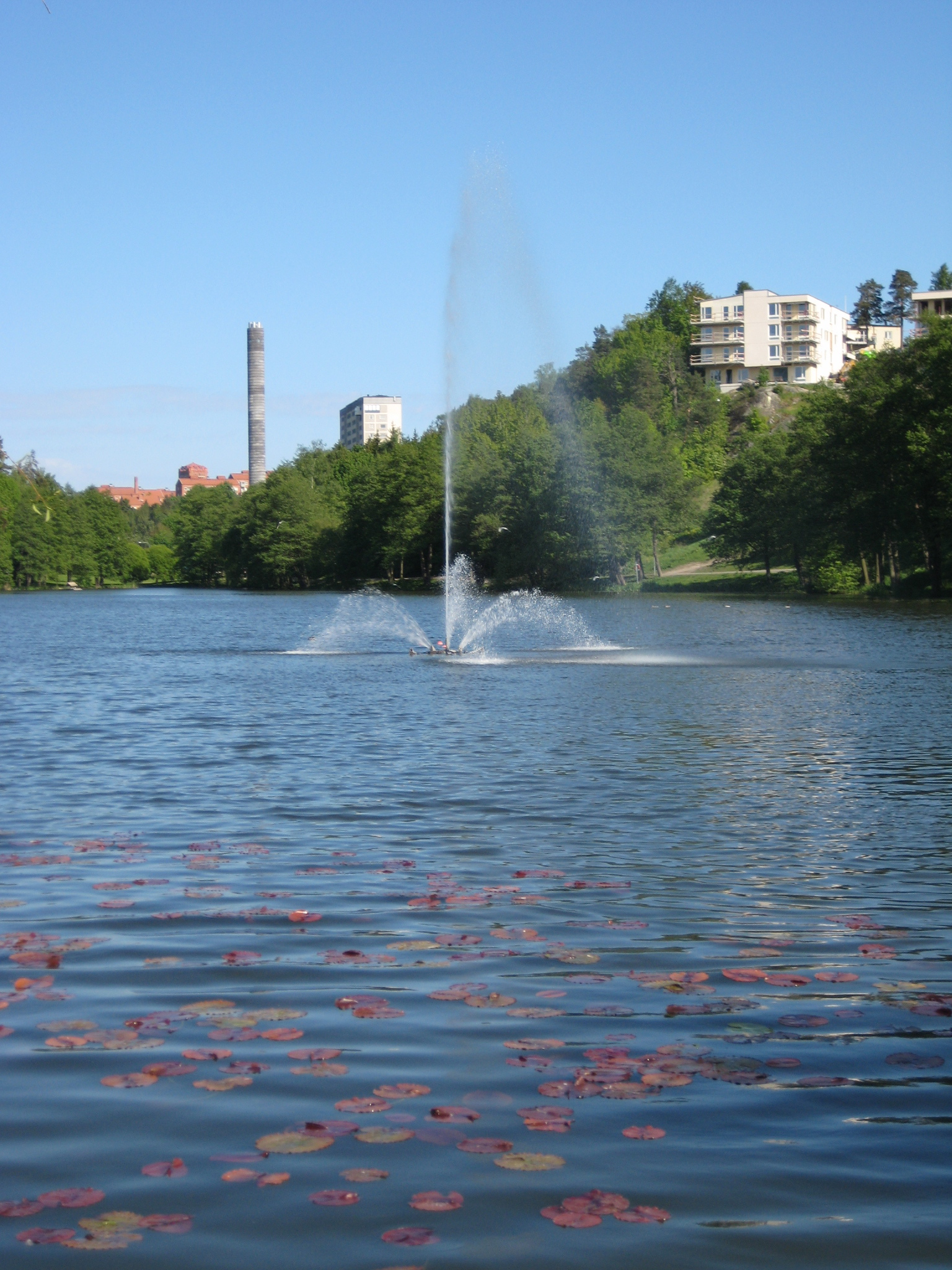
Lötsjön, a lake in the middle of Sundbyberg

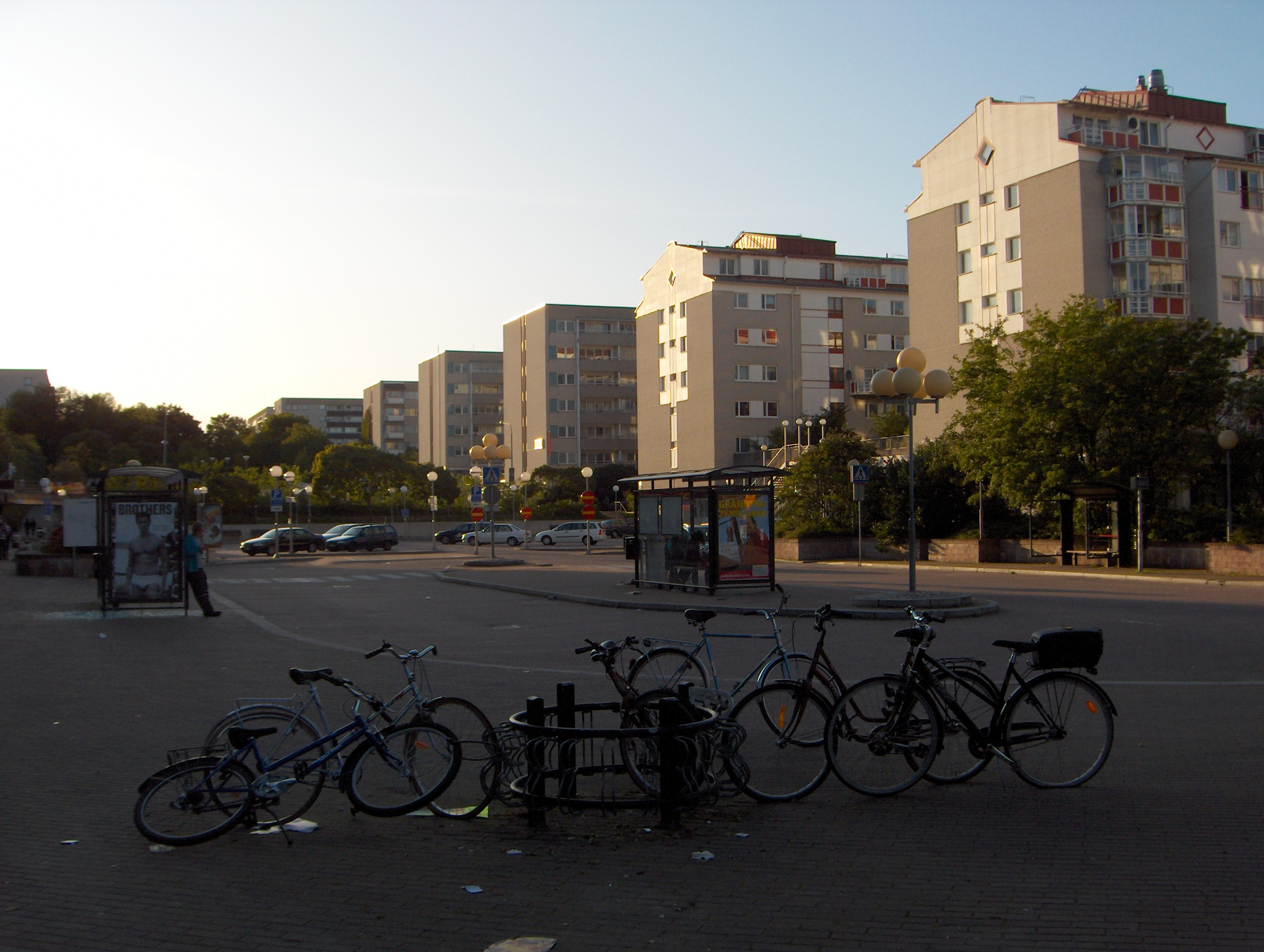
Hallonbergen centre

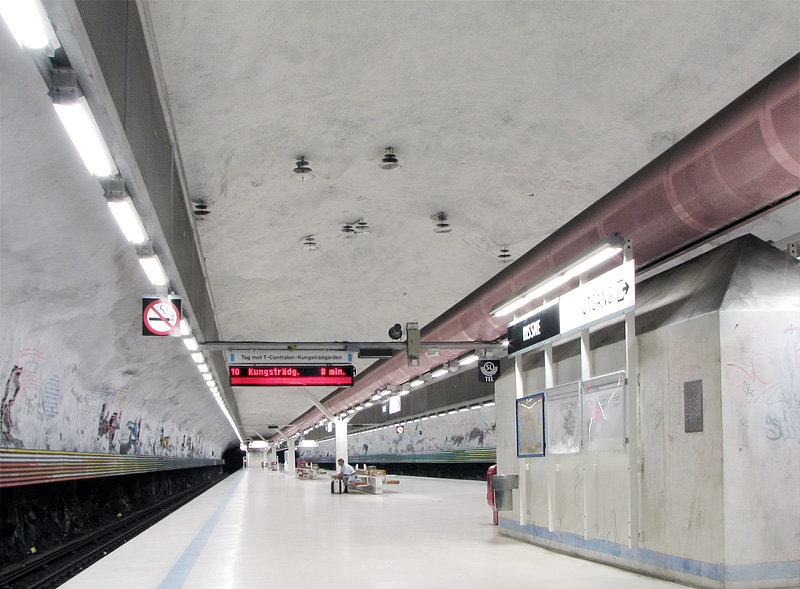
Metro station in Rissne

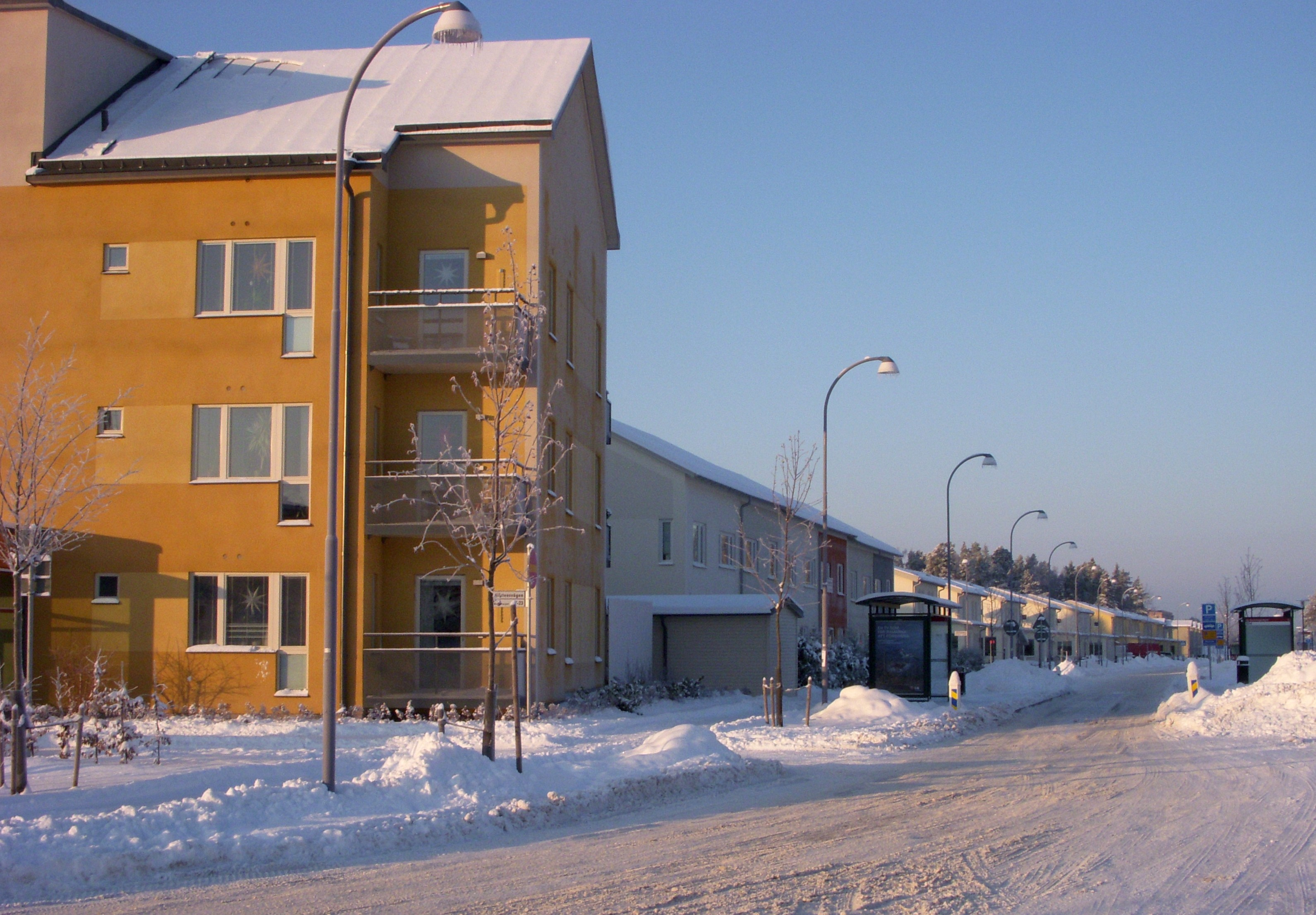
Residential buildings in Stora Ursvik
