= Hallonbergen =

Suburb of Stockholm, Sweden

Coordinates: 59°22′31″N 17°58′09″E

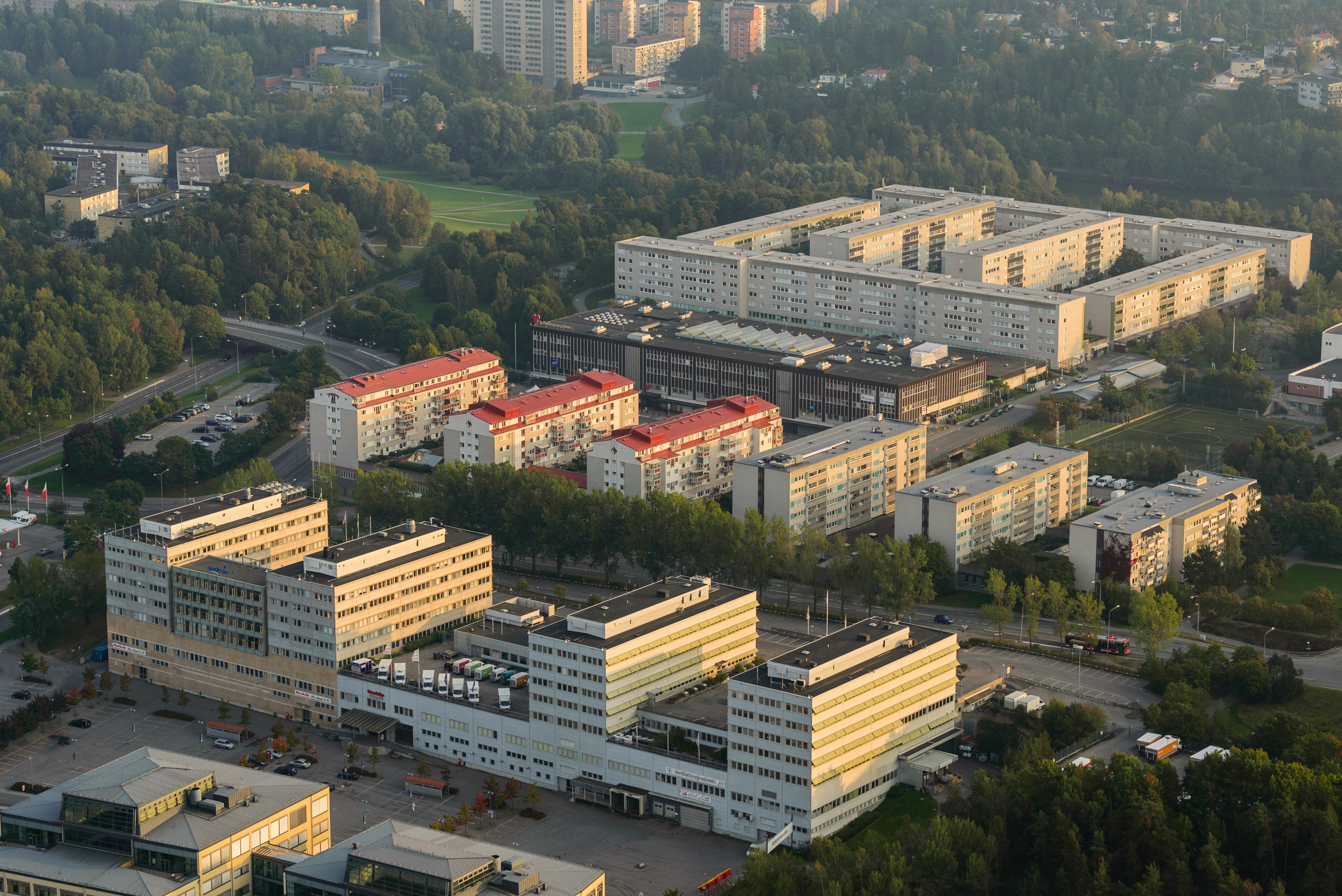
Hallonbergen in 2014

Hallonbergen (lit. 'the Raspberry Mountains') is a suburb of Stockholm, Sweden.

Hallonbergen, which has about 5,400 inhabitants, located in Sundbyberg Municipality in the north west of Stockholm, is a fairly typical 1960-1970s area of dense Million Programme housing in the style of multi-level concrete apartment buildings. Hallonbergen itself was built in the 1970s. Hallonbergen has a large population of immigrants; 67% of the population are born in foreign countries (as of 2010). Many of them come from Lebanon, Syria and Eritrea. But there are also many eastern European immigrants.

The metro station, which is located on the Blue Line (Akalla branch) of the Stockholm Metro, was opened in 1975.

== See also ==
- Hallonbergen metro station
