= Husby metro station =

Stockholm Metro station

Husby

General information
- Location: Husby, Stockholm
- Coordinates: 59°24′37″N 17°55′32″E
- System: Stockholm Metro station
- Owner: Storstockholms Lokaltrafik
- Platforms: 1 island platform
- Tracks: 2

Construction
- Structure type: Underground
- Accessible: Yes

Other information
- Station code: HUB

History
- Opened: 5 June 1977; 49 years ago

Passengers
- 2019: 6,200 boarding per weekday

Services
Preceding station	Stockholm Metro	Following station
Kista towards Kungsträdgården	Line 11	Akalla Terminus
Location
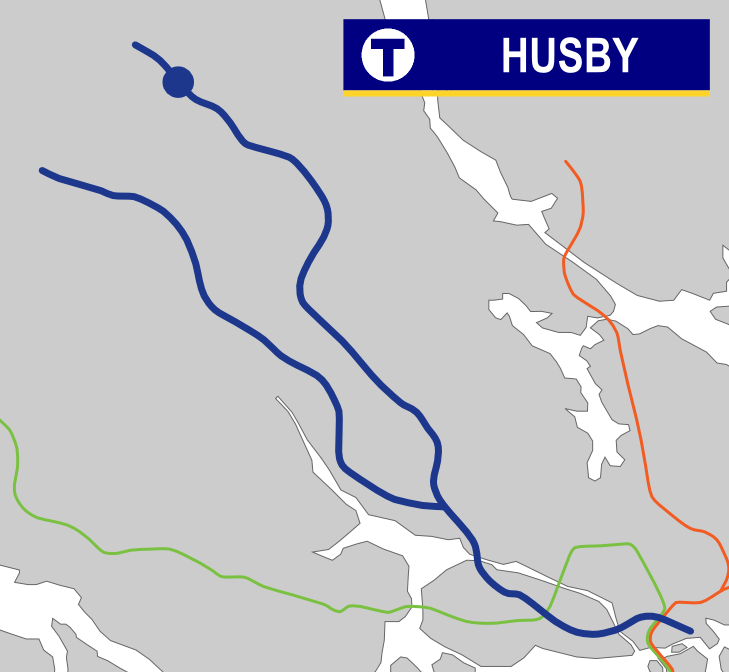

Husby is a station on the Blue Line of the Stockholm Metro, located in the district of Husby, northern Stockholm. The station was inaugurated on 5 June 1977 as part of the extension from Hallonbergen to Akalla. The distance to Kungsträdgården is 15 km (9.3 mi).

== Gallery ==
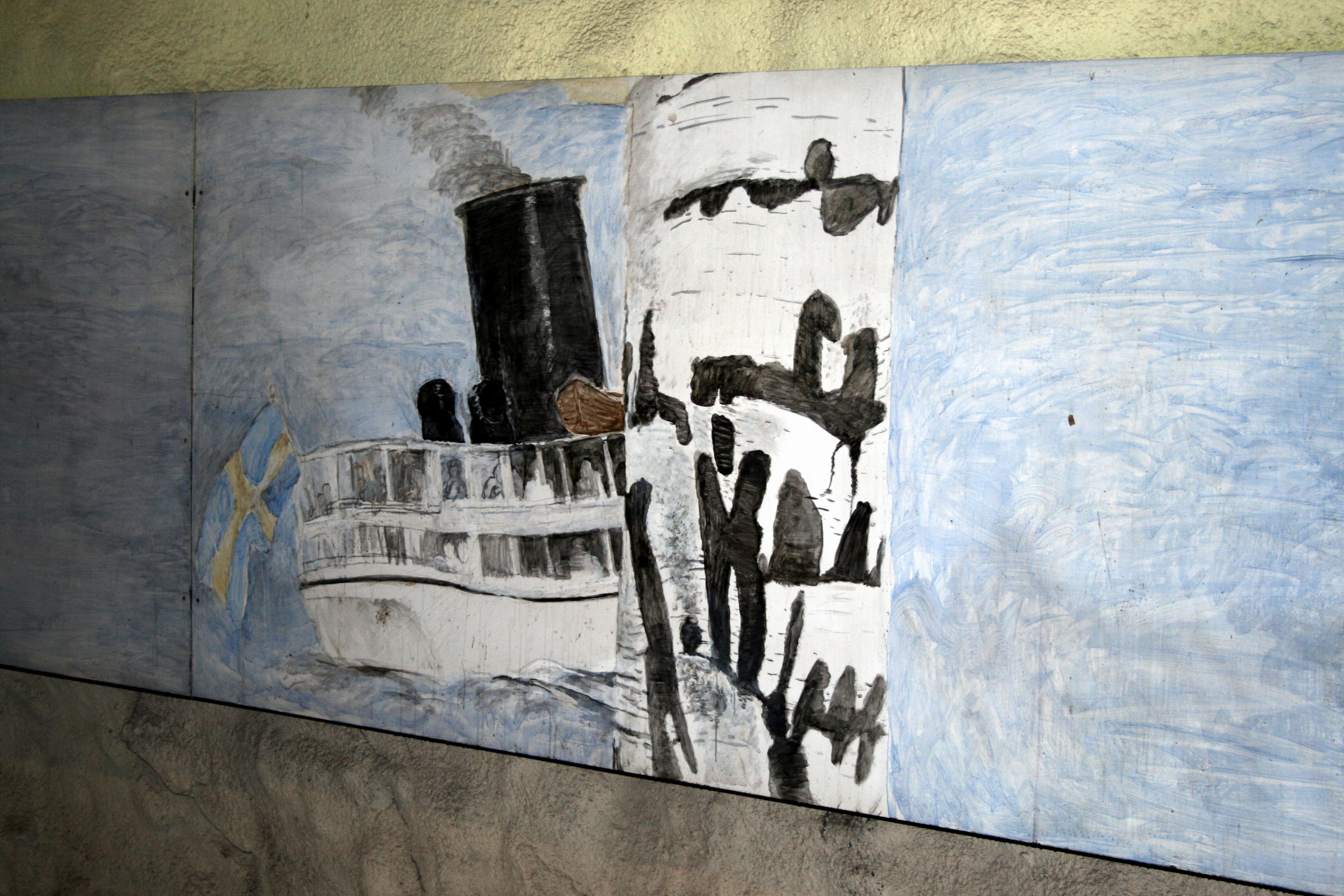

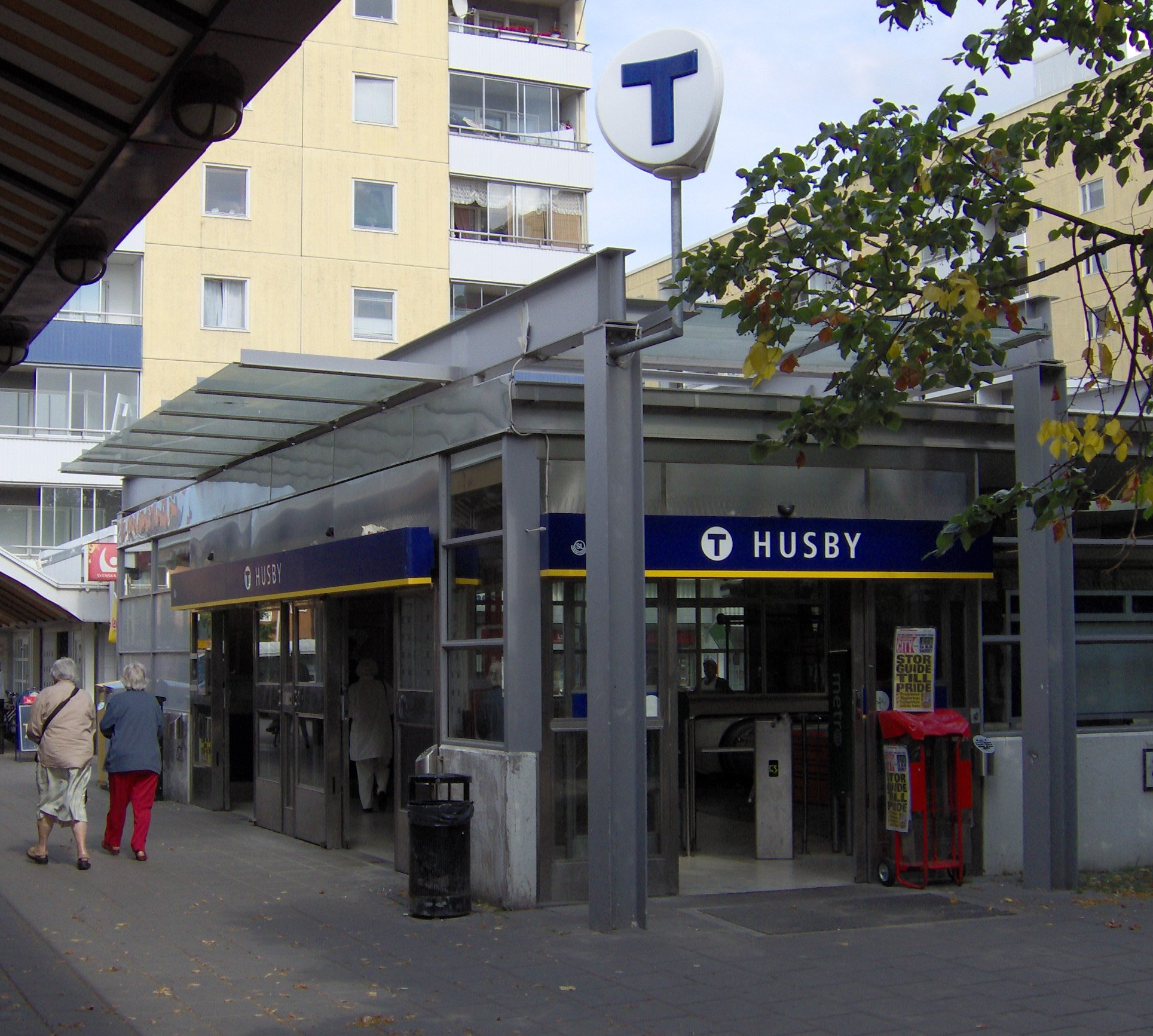

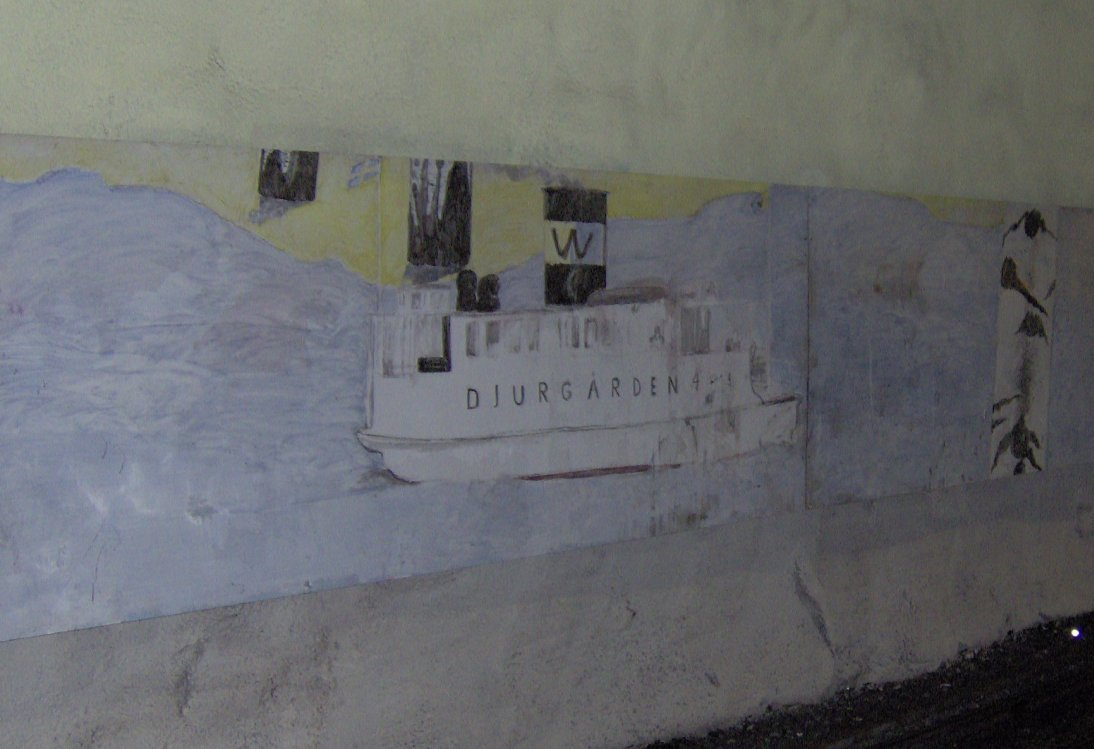

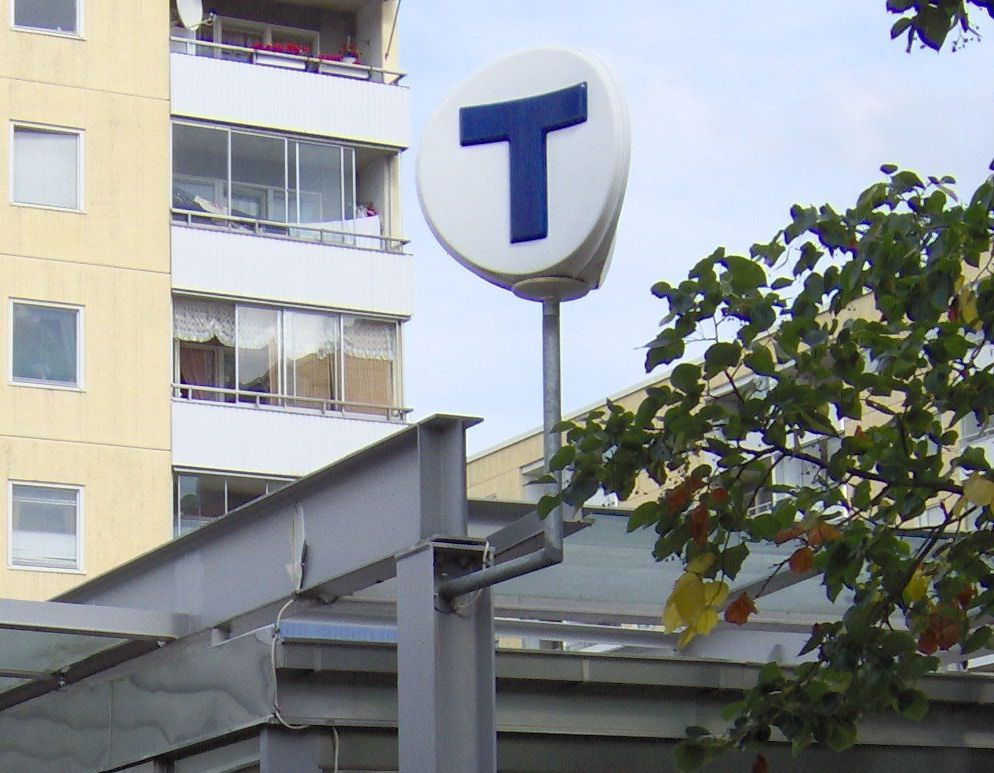
