= Rådhuset metro station =

Stockholm Metro station

Rådhuset
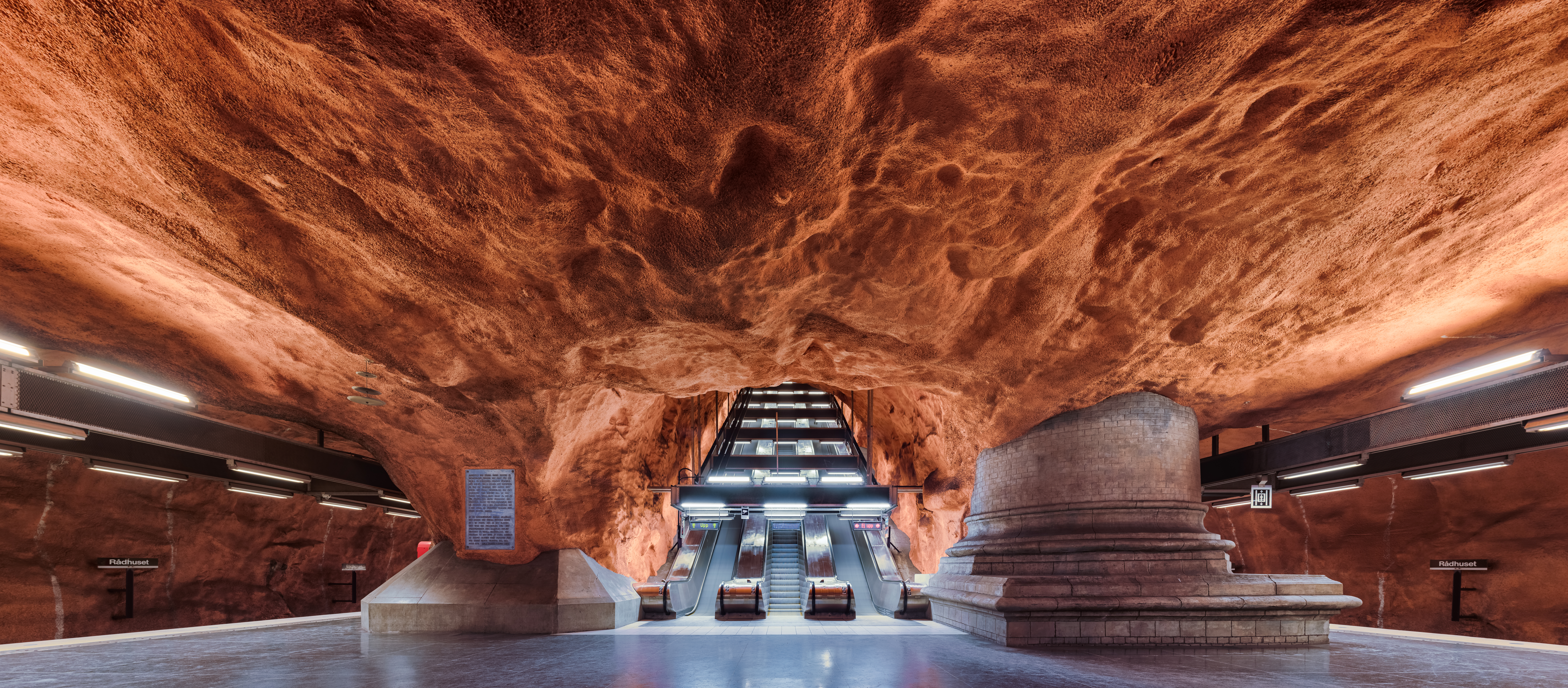
- Exposed bedrock and escalators at the eastern end of the platforms

General information
- Location: Kungsholmen, Stockholm
- Coordinates: 59°19′49″N 18°02′31″E
- Elevation: −20.5 m (−67 ft) below sea level
- System: Stockholm Metro station
- Owner: Storstockholms Lokaltrafik
- Platforms: 1 island platform
- Tracks: 2

Construction
- Structure type: Underground
- Accessible: Yes

Other information
- Station code: RÅH

History
- Opened: 31 August 1975; 51 years ago

Passengers
- 2019: 13,100 boarding per weekday

Services
Preceding station	Stockholm Metro	Following station
T-Centralen towards Kungsträdgården	Line 10	Fridhemsplan towards Hjulsta
T-Centralen towards Kungsträdgården	Line 11	Fridhemsplan towards Akalla
Location
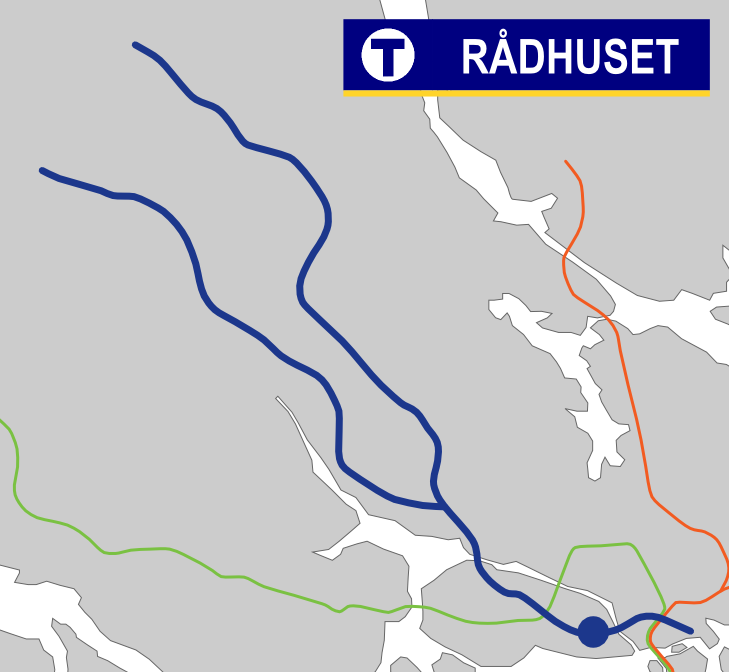

Rådhuset metro station is a metro station in Kungsholmen in central Stockholm, part of the Stockholm Metro. The station is located on the Blue Line between T-Centralen and Fridhemsplan and was opened on 31 August 1975 as part the first stretch of the Blue Line between T-Centralen and Hjulsta. The trains were running via Hallonbergen and Rinkeby.

Like some other stations on the Stockholm Metro, it uses organic architecture, which leaves the bedrock exposed and unsculptured and the station appearing to be based on natural cave systems.

The underground station is named after Rådhuset (The Courthouse) right above the surface. The City Hall and the Police Headquarters are also located in the vicinity.

== Gallery ==
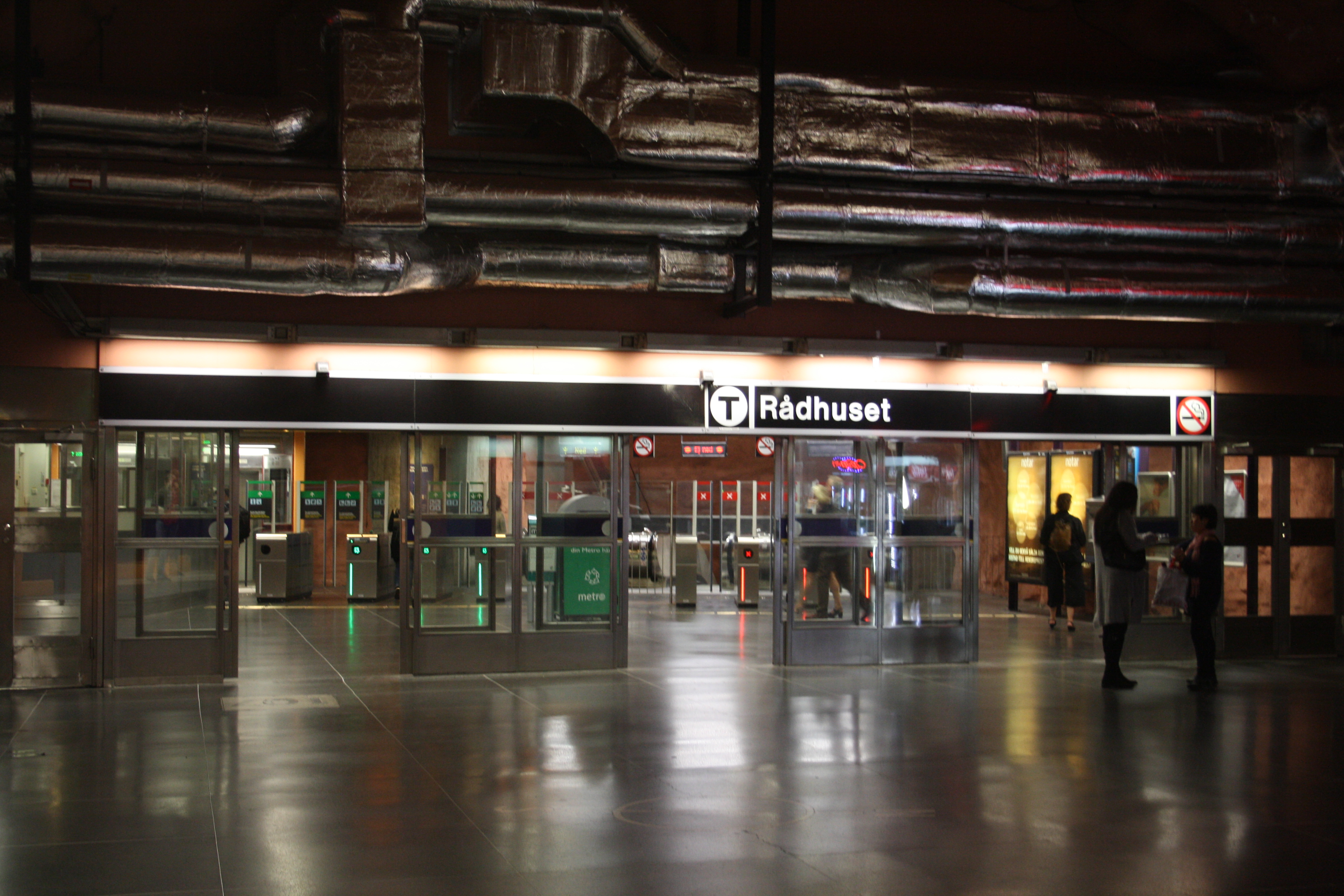
Station entrance

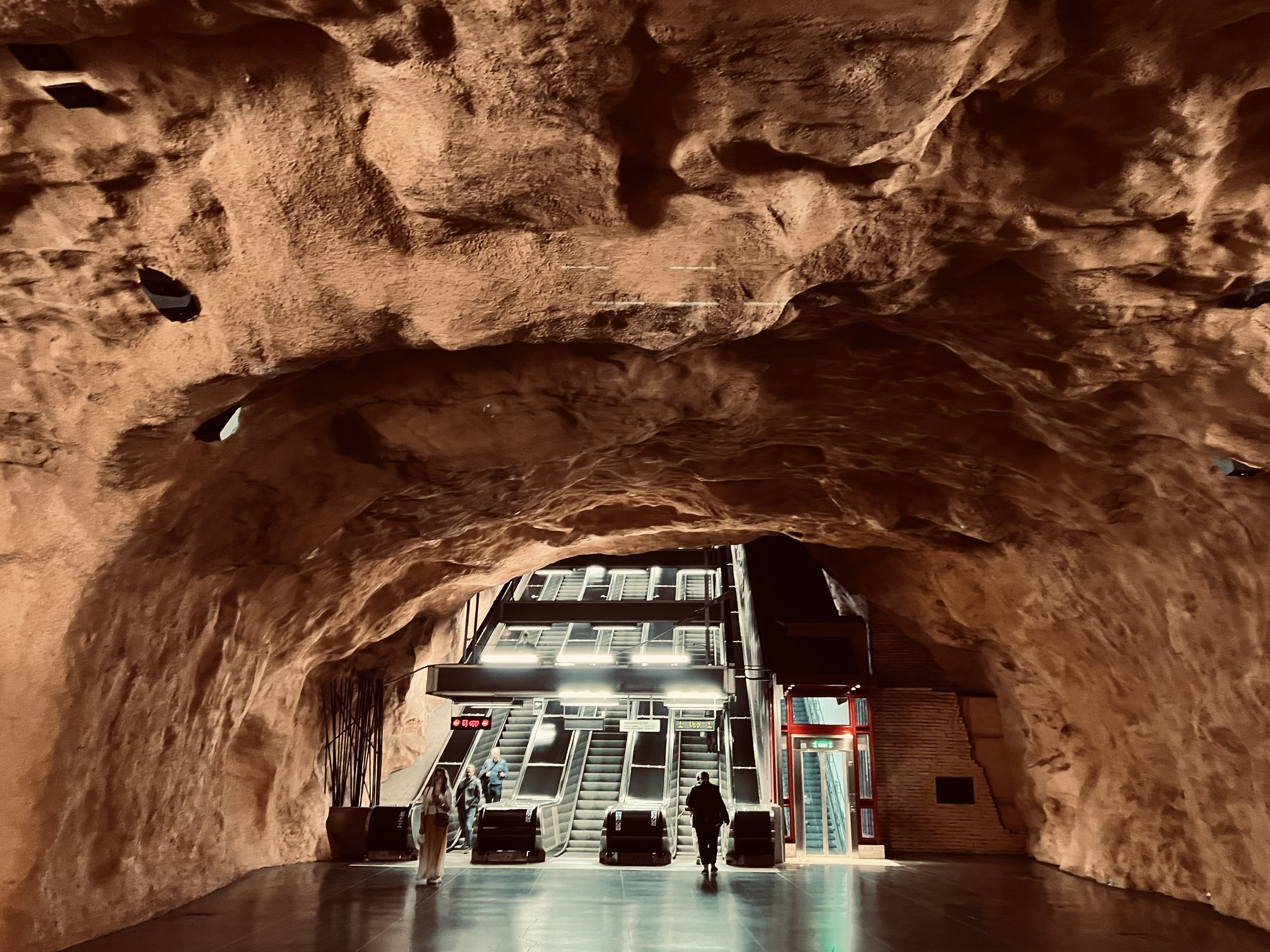
Escalators at the western end of the station

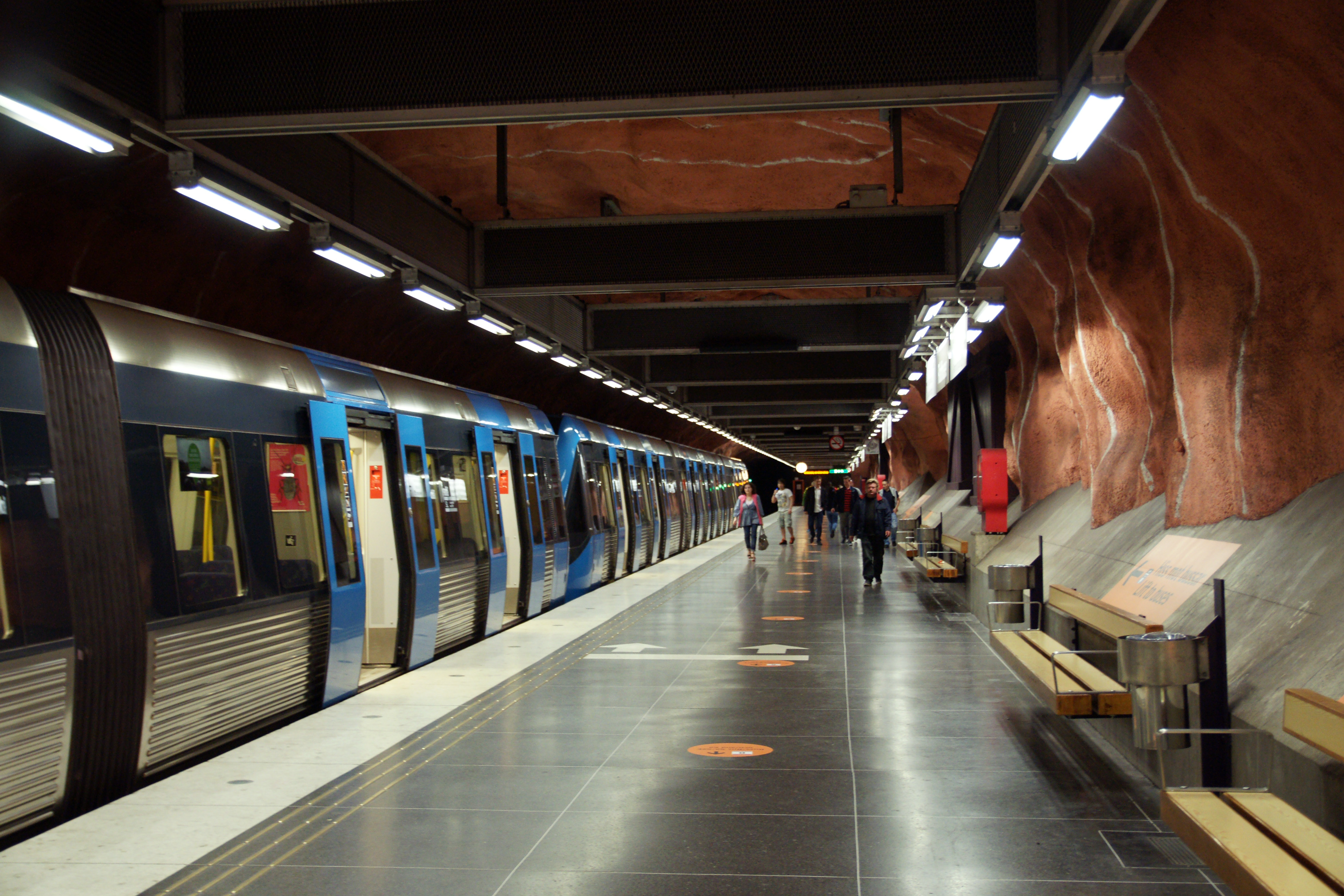
View down a platform

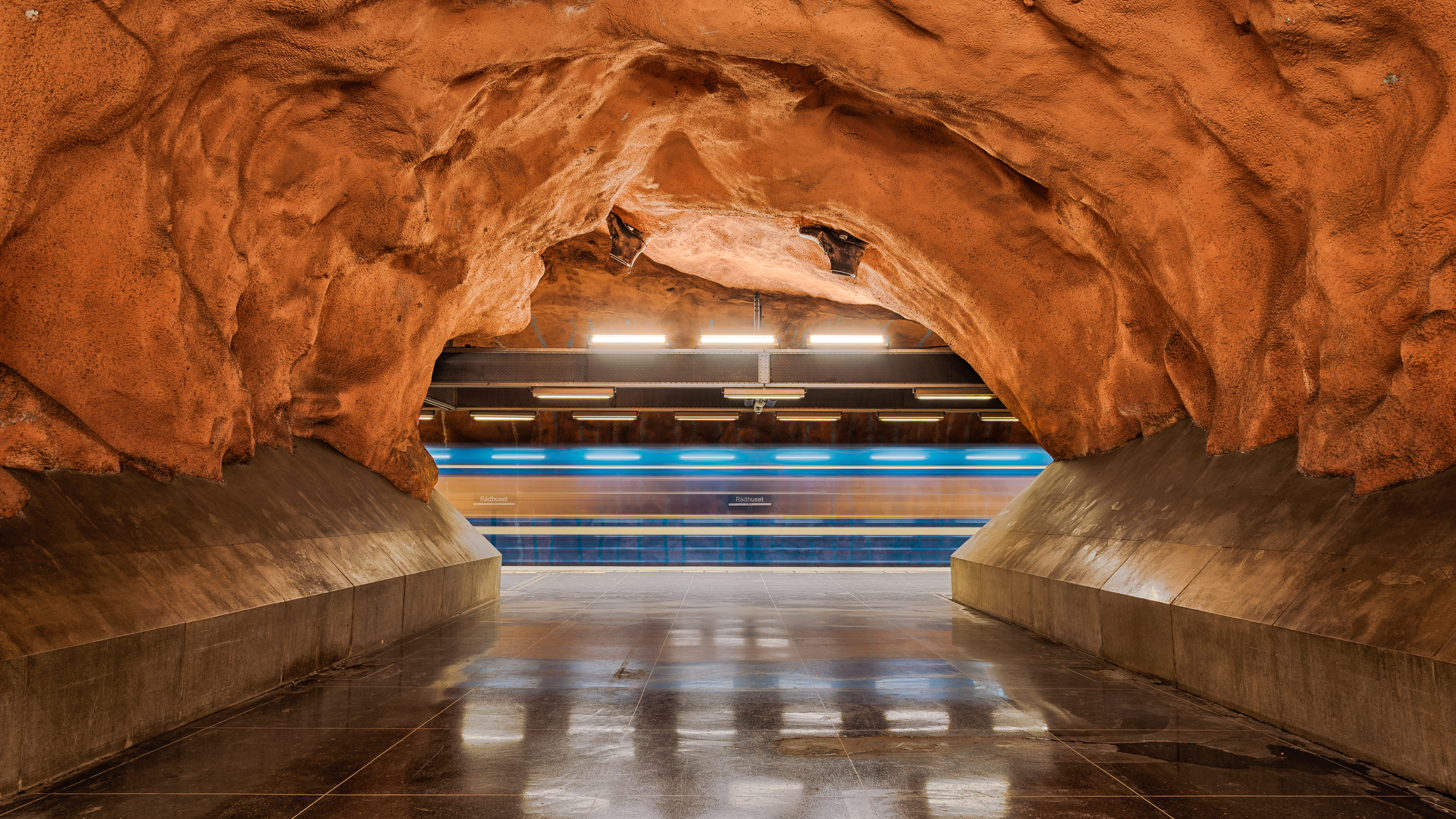
Passage in between the vaults
