= Kista metro station =

Stockholm Metro station

Kista

General information
- Location: Kista, Rinkeby-Kista, Västerort, Stockholm
- Coordinates: 59°24′10″N 17°56′31″E
- Elevation: 10 m (33 ft) above sea level
- System: Stockholm Metro station
- Owner: Storstockholms Lokaltrafik
- Platforms: 1 island platform
- Tracks: 2

Construction
- Structure type: Elevated
- Accessible: Yes

Other information
- Station code: KIS

History
- Opened: 5 June 1977; 49 years ago

Passengers
- 2019: 19,800 boarding per weekday

Services
Preceding station	Stockholm Metro	Following station
Hallonbergen towards Kungsträdgården	Line 11	Husby towards Akalla
Location
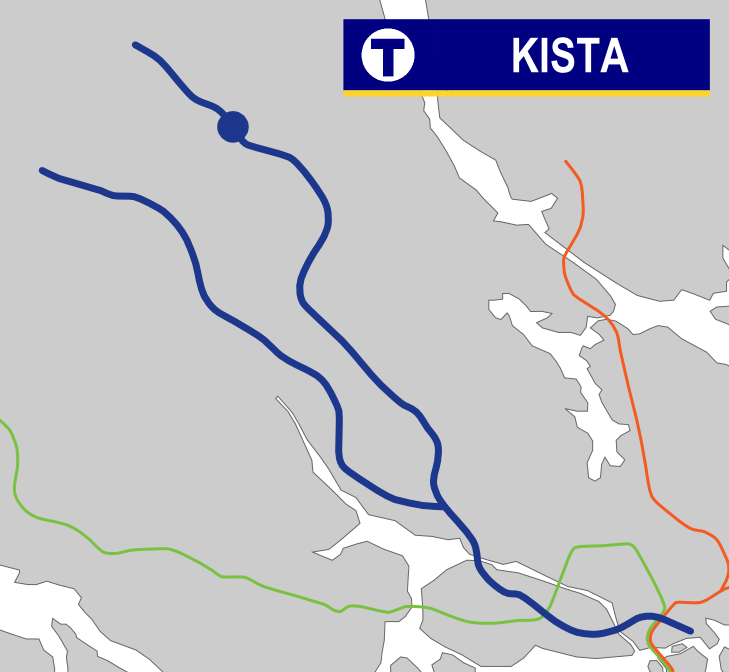

Kista metro station is a station on the Blue Line of the Stockholm Metro, located in the district of Kista, northern Stockholm. The distance to Kungsträdgården is 15.9 km (9.9 mi). It was opened on 5 June 1977 as part of the extension from Hallonbergen to Akalla. The station is the only one on the blue line above ground. There have been several safety incidents around Kista metro station, including shootings, stabbings and robberies.

== Gallery ==
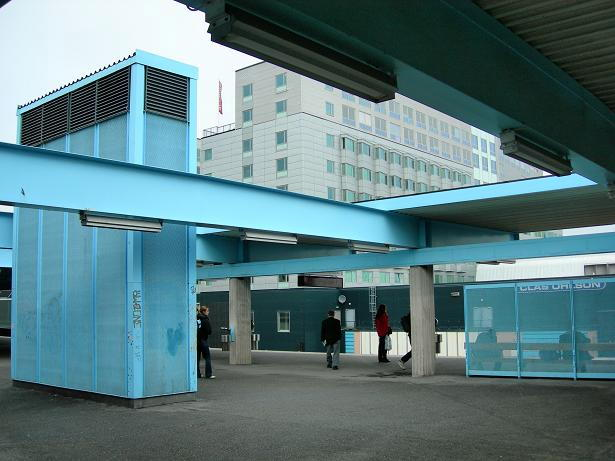

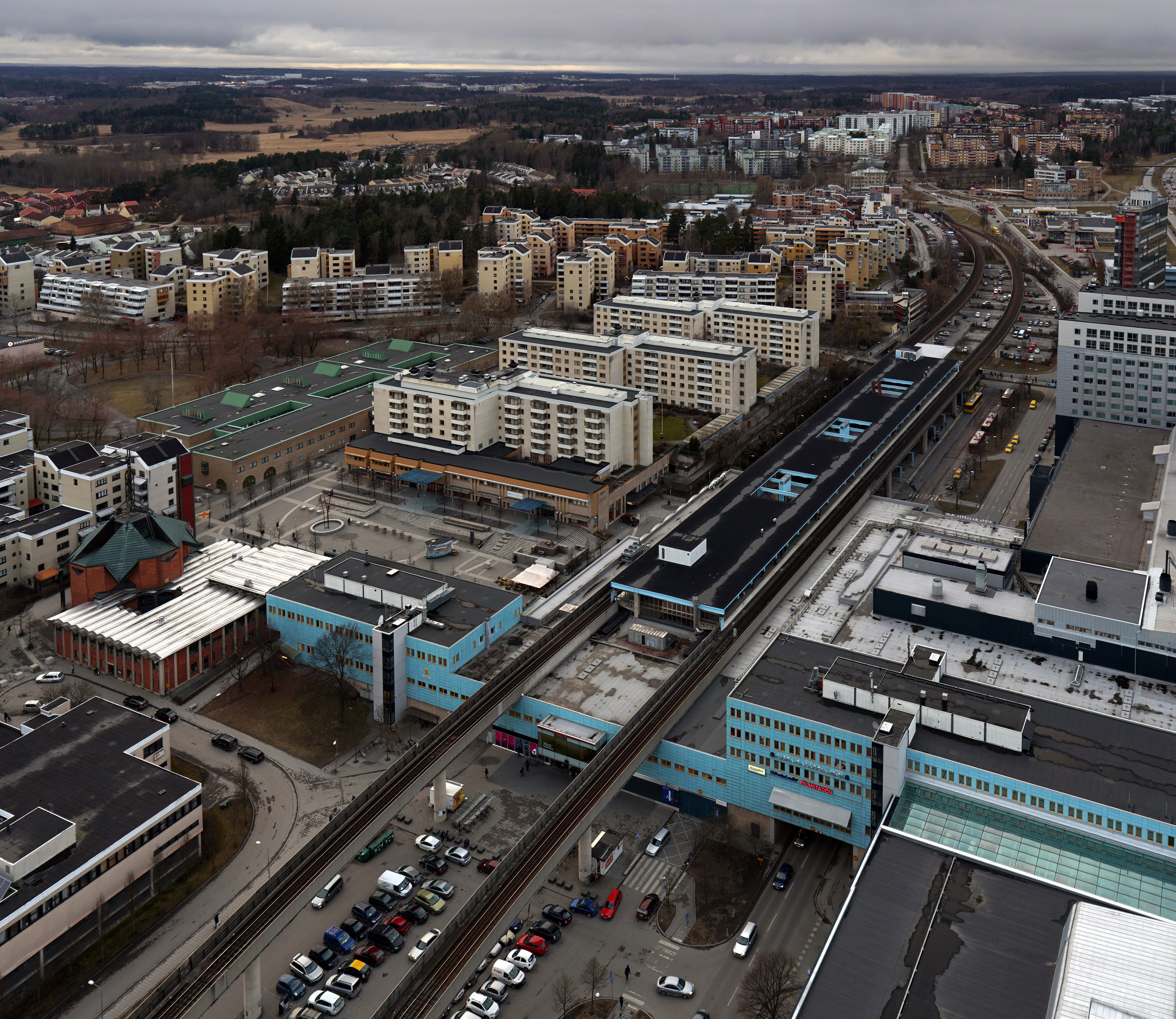

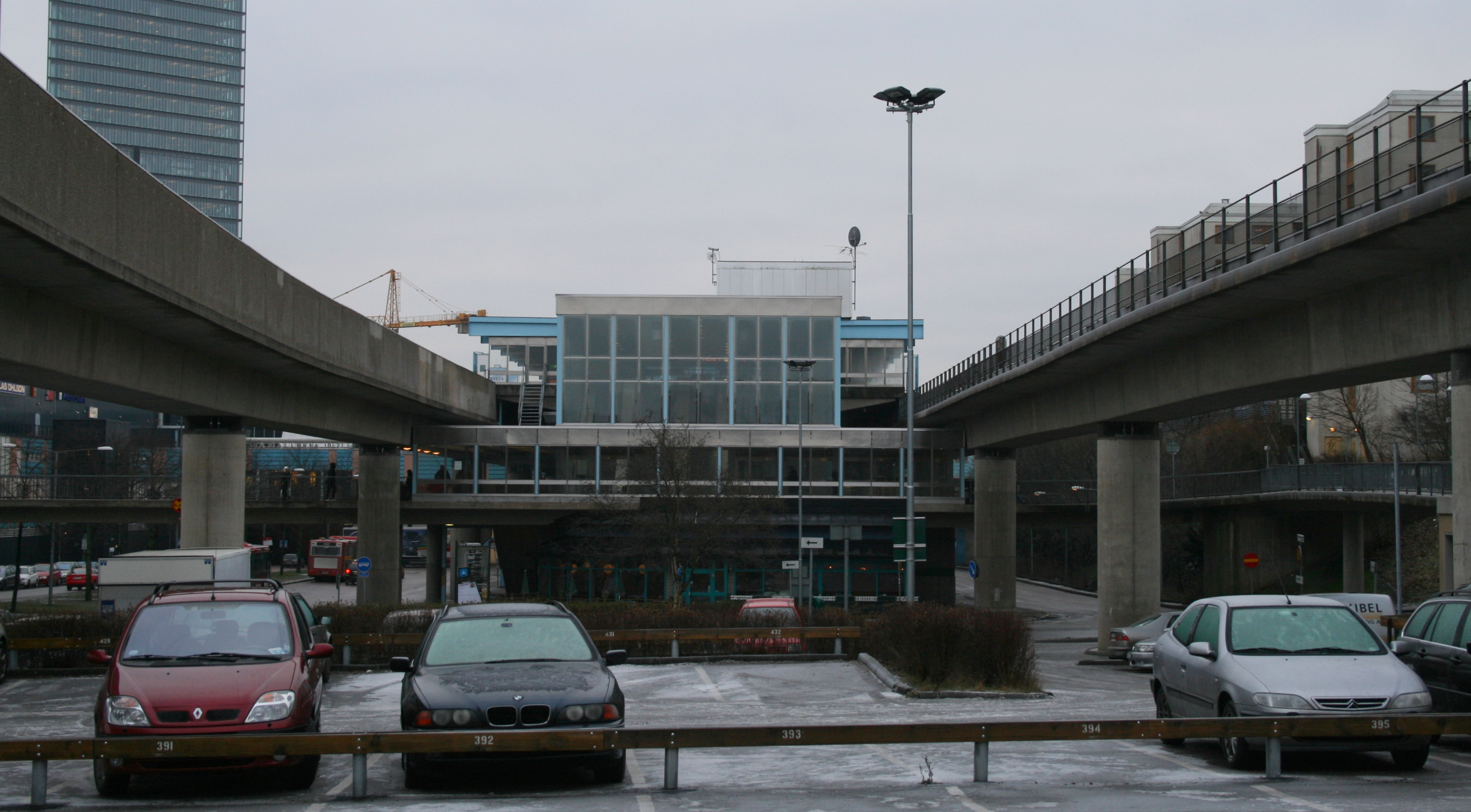
