= Solna centrum metro station =

Stockholm Metro station

Solna centrum
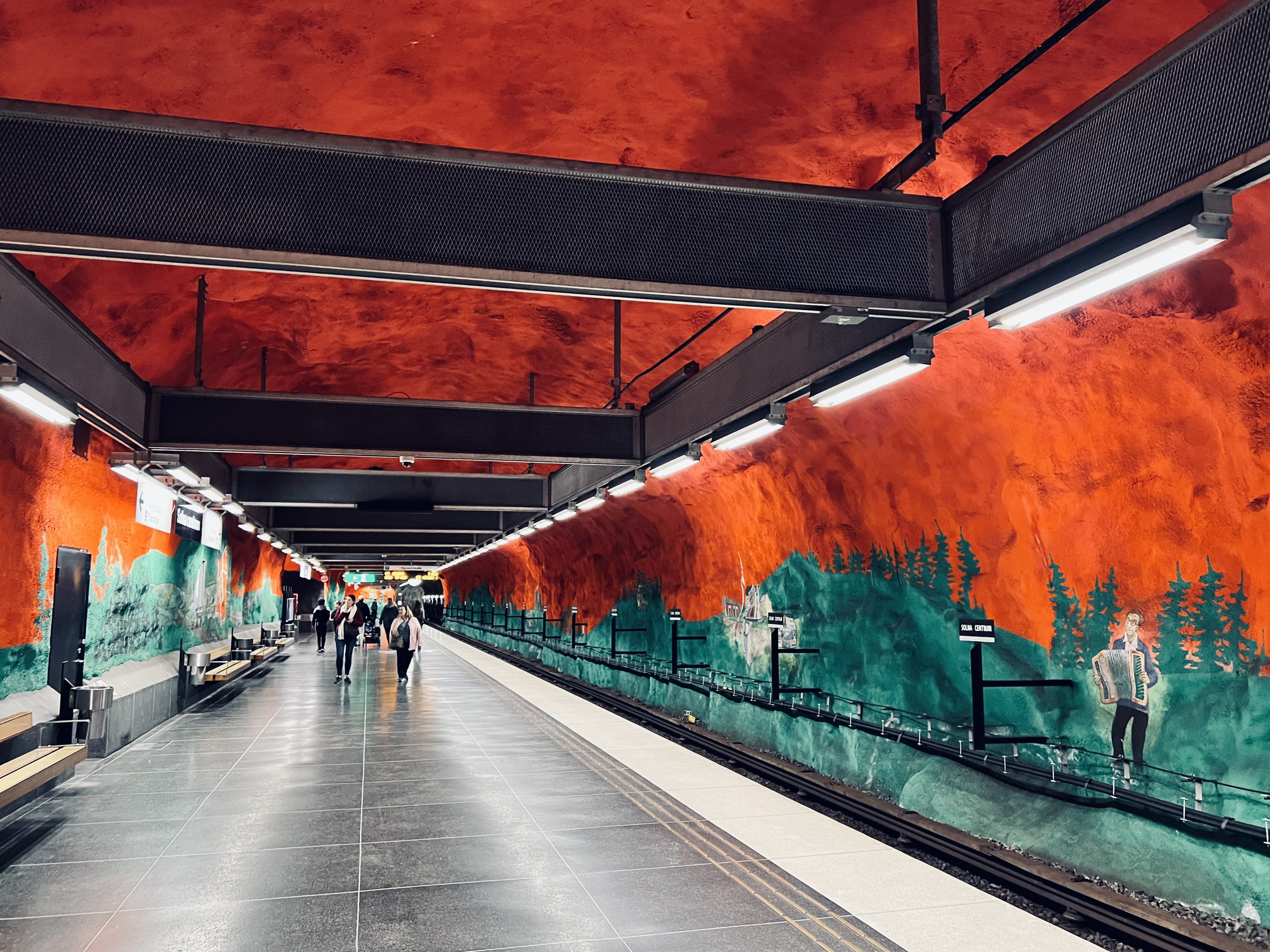

General information
- Location: Solna
- Coordinates: 59°21′35.9″N 17°59′52.8″E
- System: Stockholm Metro station
- Owner: Storstockholms Lokaltrafik
- Platforms: 1 island platform
- Tracks: 2
- Connections: Line 30 (Tvärbanan)

Construction
- Structure type: Underground
- Depth: 27–36 m (89–118 ft)
- Accessible: Yes

Other information
- Station code: SOC

History
- Opened: 31 August 1975; 51 years ago

Passengers
- 2019: 11,400 boarding per weekday (metro)
- 2019: 3,100 boarding per weekday (Tvärbanan)

Services
Preceding station	Stockholm Metro	Following station
Västra skogen towards Kungsträdgården	Line 11	Näckrosen towards Akalla

Other services
Preceding station	SL Local & Light Rail	Following station
Solna station Terminus	Tvärbanan Line 30	Solna Business Park towards Sickla
Location
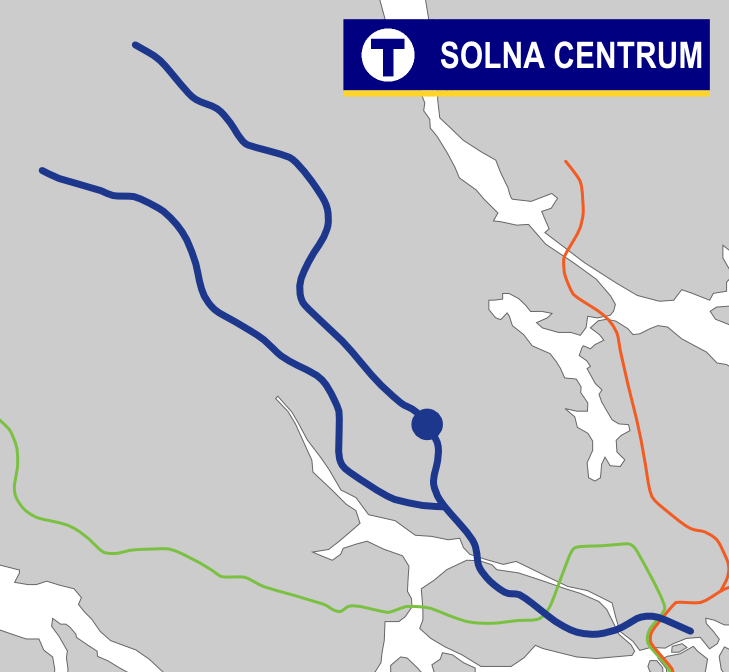

Solna centrum is a Metro station in Solna Municipality, approximately 5 km (3.1 mi) from central Stockholm, Sweden.

It is close to the Solna Centrum shopping centre and Strawberry Arena. It opened on 31 August 1975 as part the first stretch of the Blue Line between T-Centralen and Hjulsta. The mall contains around 120 stores and restaurants, 40 offices and 214 apartments.

== Incidents ==
On 13 May 2014, filmmaker Malik Bendjelloul died by suicide at the station after jumping off a platform.
