= Gösta Wallmark =

Swedish artist

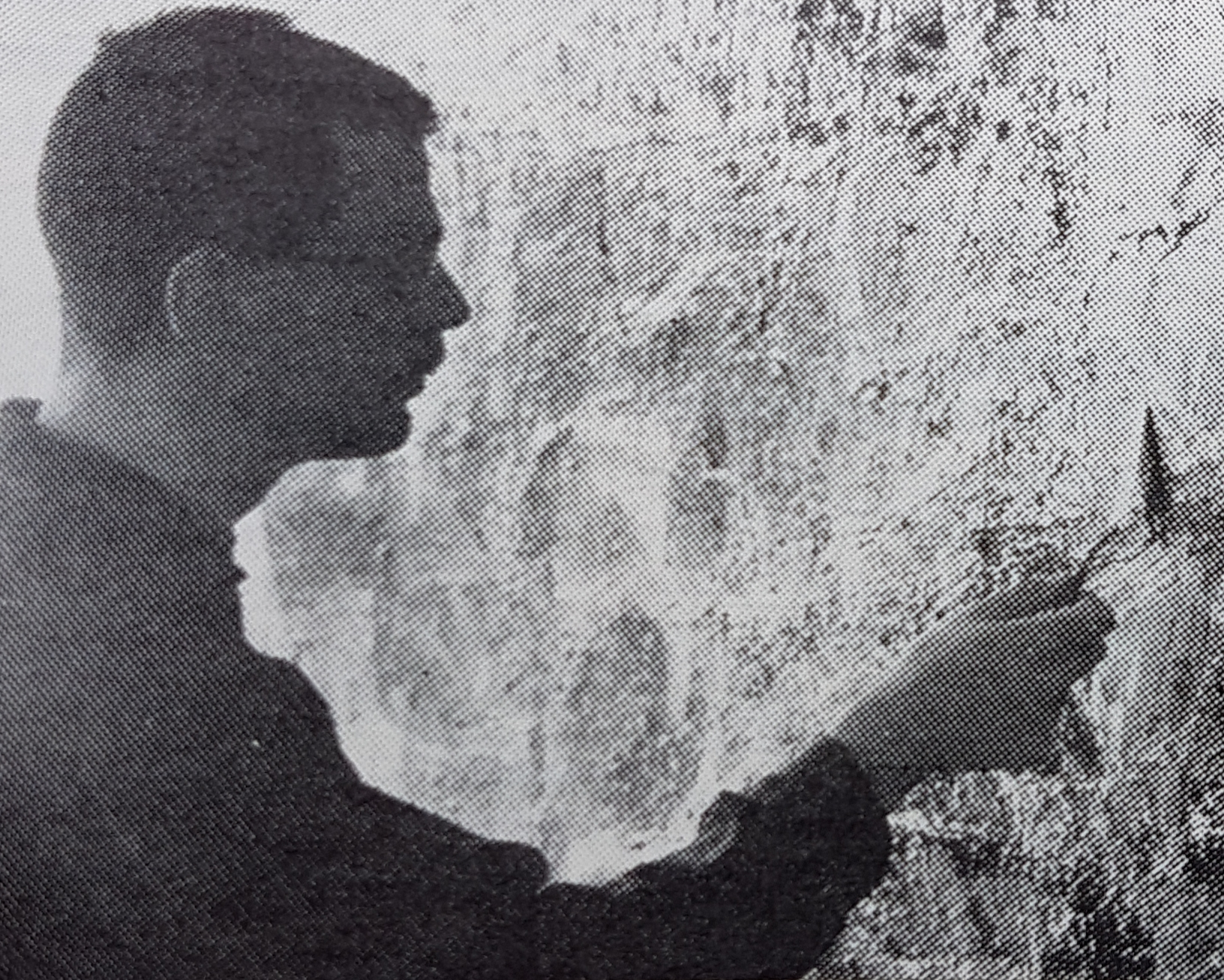
Per Gustav Gösta Hjalmar Wallmark, Swedish artist

Per Gustav Gösta Hjalmar Wallmark (June 11, 1928 – November 20, 2017) was a Swedish visual artist and cartoonist.

== Bibliography ==
Gösta Wallmark was born on June 11, 1928 in Luleå, Sweden. He got his education from Otte Skölds målarskola in Stockholm, Ecole des Beaux Arts in Paris and at Royal Swedish Academy of Arts.

Wallmark created a wall relief at Garnisonen, Stockholm in 1972. Together with Elis Eriksson he was responsible for the artistic decoration of Hallonbergen metro station in Stockholm which opened 31 August 1975. His work is in museum collections, including at Moderna Museet in Stockholm.

He died on November 20, 2017 in Visby, Sweden.
