= Lessertia =

Lessertia may refer to:

- Lessertia (plant), a flowering plants genus in the family Fabaceae
- Lessertia (spider), a spider genus in the family Linyphiidae
