= Hallonbergen metro station =

Stockholm Metro station

Hallonbergen
- Westbound platform

General information
- Location: Sundbyberg, Stockholm
- Coordinates: 59°22′31″N 17°58′09″E
- System: Stockholm Metro station
- Owner: Storstockholms Lokaltrafik
- Platforms: 2 (1 island platform, 1 side platform)
- Tracks: 3

Construction
- Structure type: Underground
- Depth: 28 m (92 ft)
- Accessible: Yes

Other information
- Station code: HAB

History
- Opened: 31 August 1975; 51 years ago

Passengers
- 2019: 7,350 boarding per weekday

Services
Preceding station	Stockholm Metro	Following station
Näckrosen towards Kungsträdgården	Line 11	Kista towards Akalla
Location
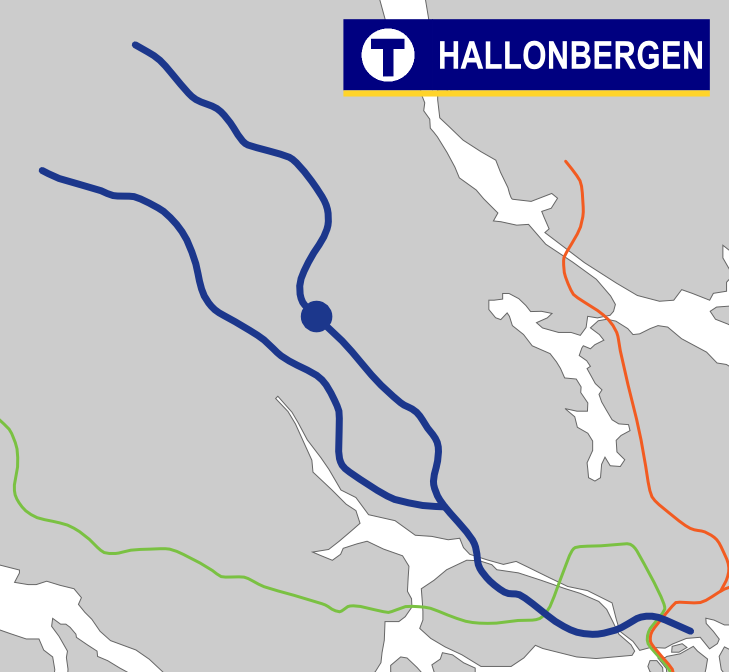

Hallonbergen is a station on the Blue Line of the Stockholm Metro, located in Sundbyberg. The station was opened on 31 August 1975 as part the first stretch of the Blue Line between T-Centralen and Hjulsta. The trains were running to Hallonbergen and then continued to Rinkeby via a track which is currently used for the rail yard access. On 5 June 1977, the extension north to Akalla was opened. The station's interior is covered with art intending to mimic kids' paintings done by Elis Eriksson and Gösta Wallmark. Between 1975 until 1985 Hallonbergen was the branching point for the Akalla and Hjulsta lines, as evident from its three-track layout. On 18 August 1985 the extension from Västra skogen to Rinkeby was opened, and the stretch between Hallonbergen and Rinkeby was closed for passenger traffic.

== Gallery ==
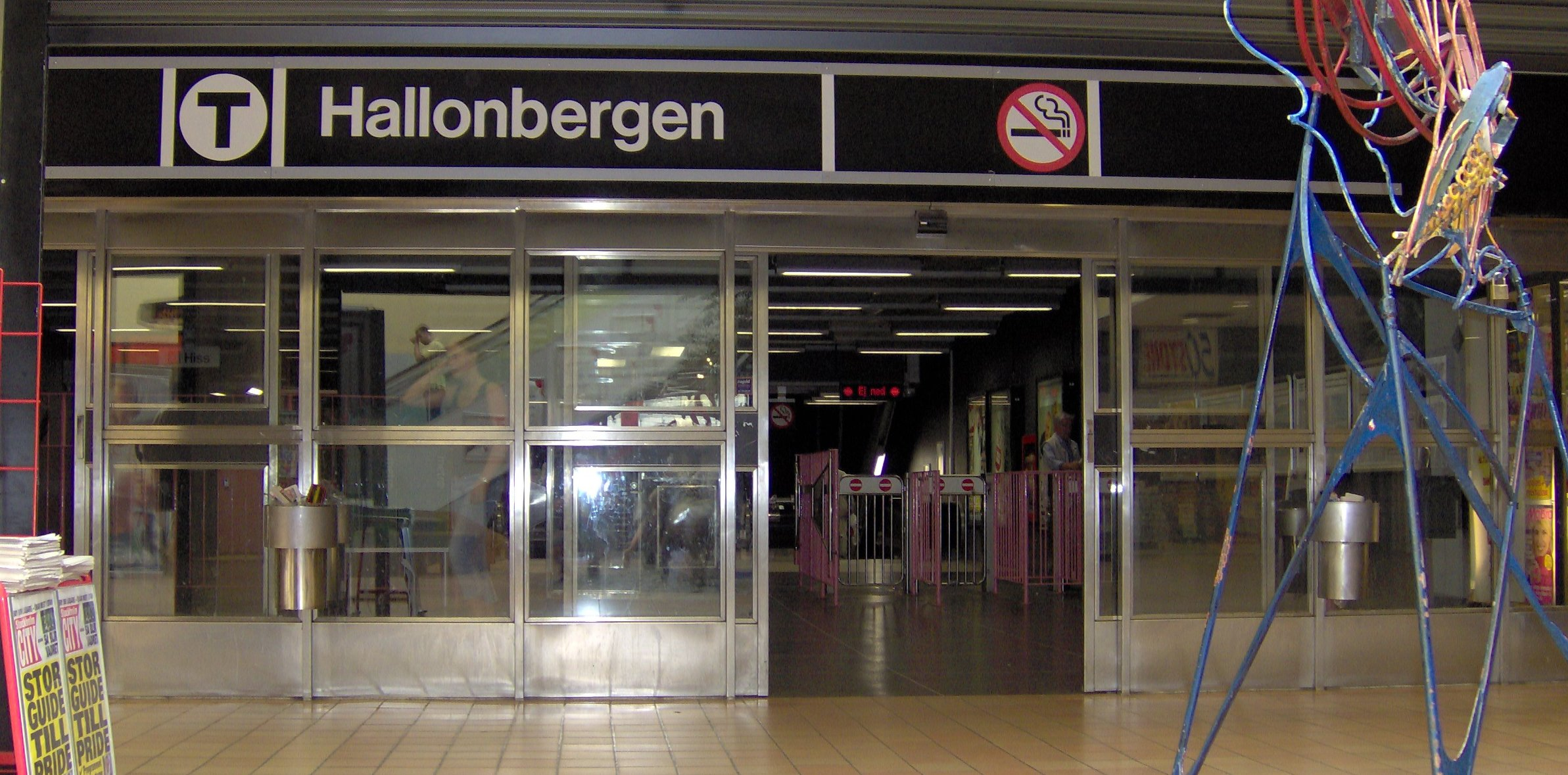
Entrance

Westbound platform (towards Akalla)

Eastbound platform (towards Kungsträdgården and Rissne metro depot)

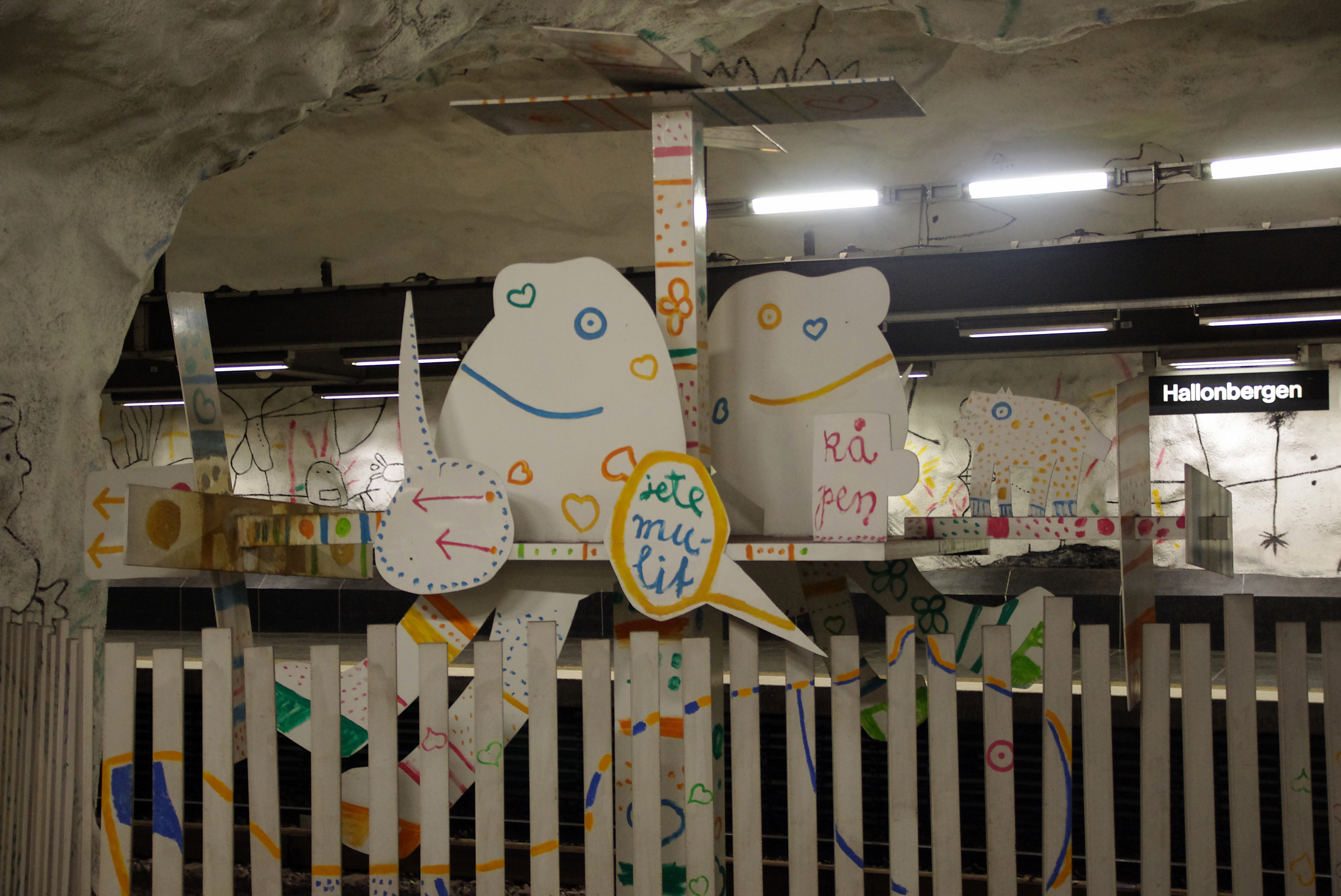
Artwork

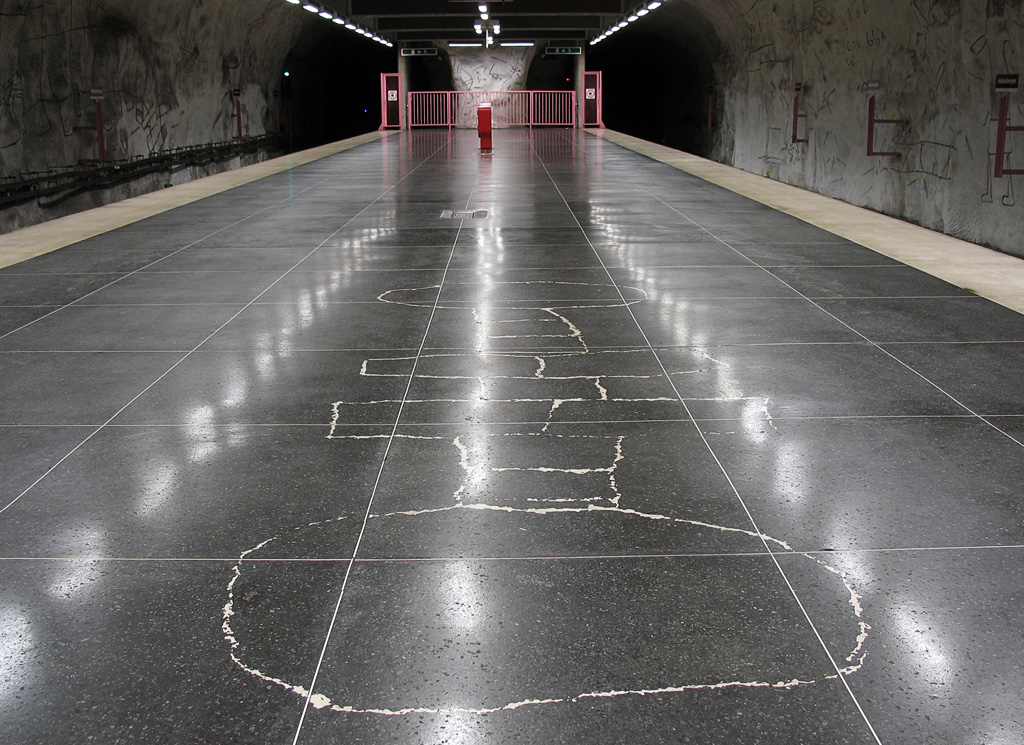
Platform

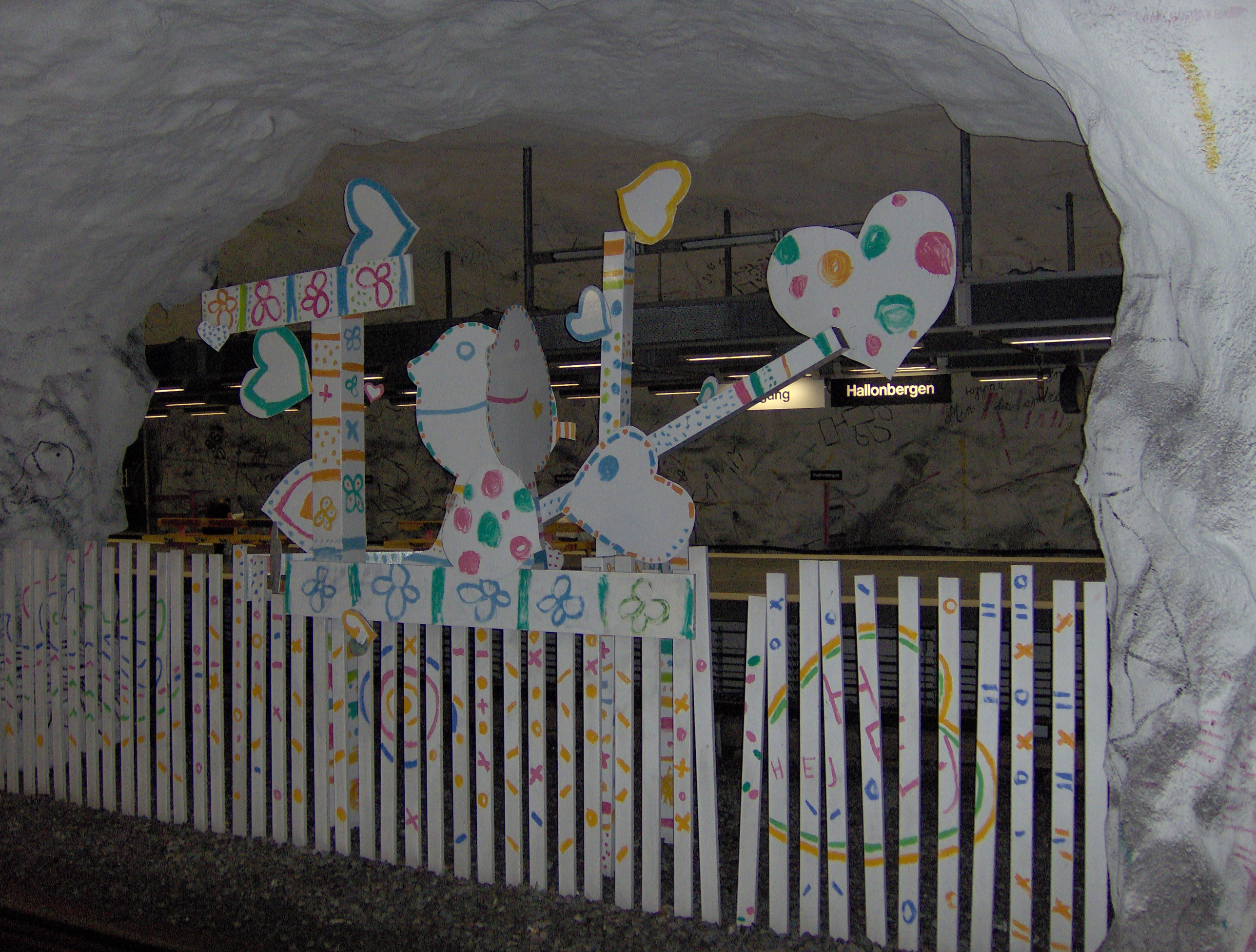
Artwork

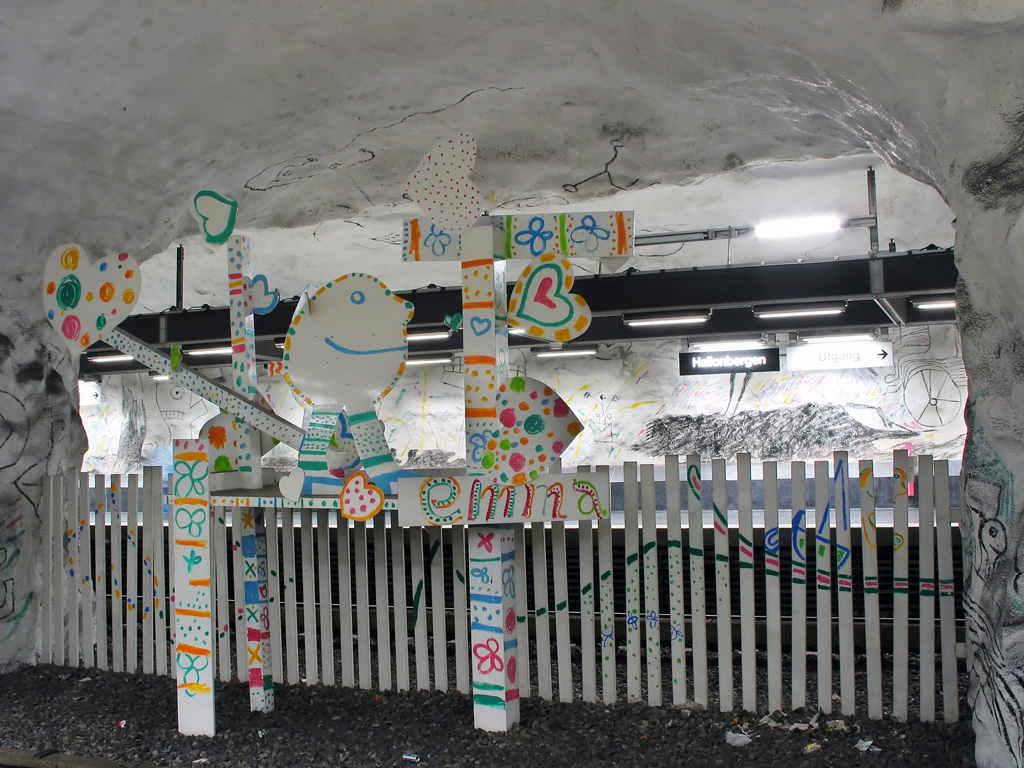
Artwork

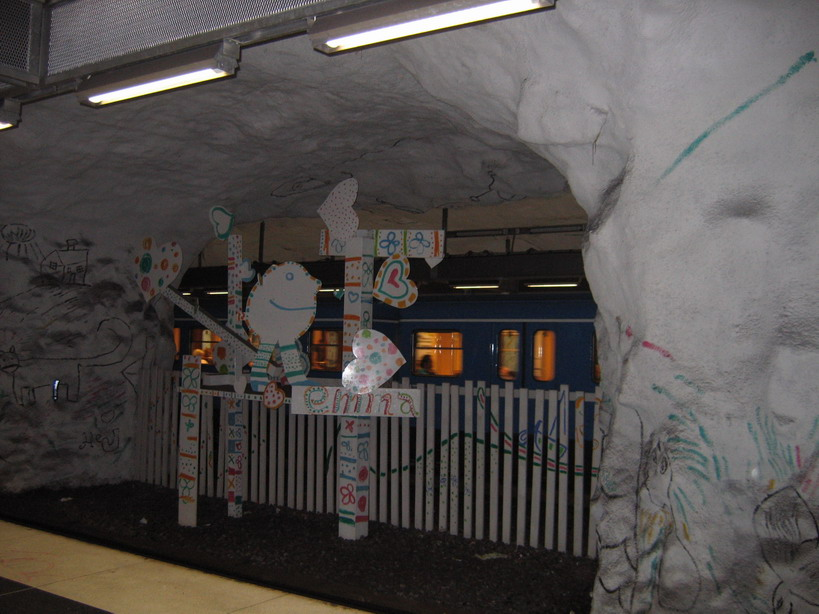
Artwork
