= Lessertia barbara =

Scientific classification
- Kingdom: Animalia
- Phylum: Arthropoda
- Subphylum: Chelicerata
- Class: Arachnida
- Order: Araneae
- Infraorder: Araneomorphae
- Family: Linyphiidae
- Genus: Lessertia
- Species: L. barbara

Binomial name
- Lessertia barbara (Simon, 1884)

Species of spider

Lessertia barbara is a spider species found in caves in Spain, Morocco, and Algeria.
