= Lessertia dentichelis =

Scientific classification
- Kingdom: Animalia
- Phylum: Arthropoda
- Subphylum: Chelicerata
- Class: Arachnida
- Order: Araneae
- Infraorder: Araneomorphae
- Family: Linyphiidae
- Genus: Lessertia
- Species: L. dentichelis

Binomial name
- Lessertia dentichelis (Simon, 1884)

Species of spider

Lessertia dentichelis is a spider species found in Europe, the Canary Islands, Madeira, Canada and New Zealand. The species is notably found in Lithuania.

There is also a notable population in Kungsträdgården metro station, in Stockholm, the only location in Sweden where the species can be found. While it is unknown exactly how the species arrived, it has been suggested the spider arrived unknown through transportation from elsewhere in Europe, or that the species existed in the archways of old buildings before the subway was built.
