= Husby, Stockholm =

Urban district in northern Stockholm, Sweden

Coordinates: 59°24′34″N 17°55′37″E

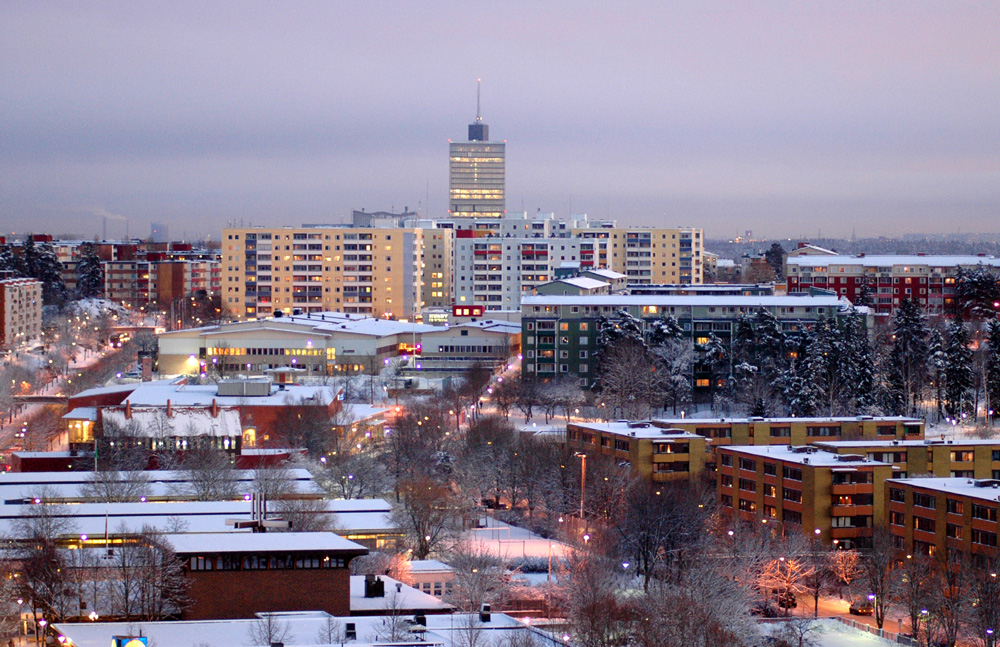
View of Akalla in the foreground, Husby and Kista Science Tower in the background

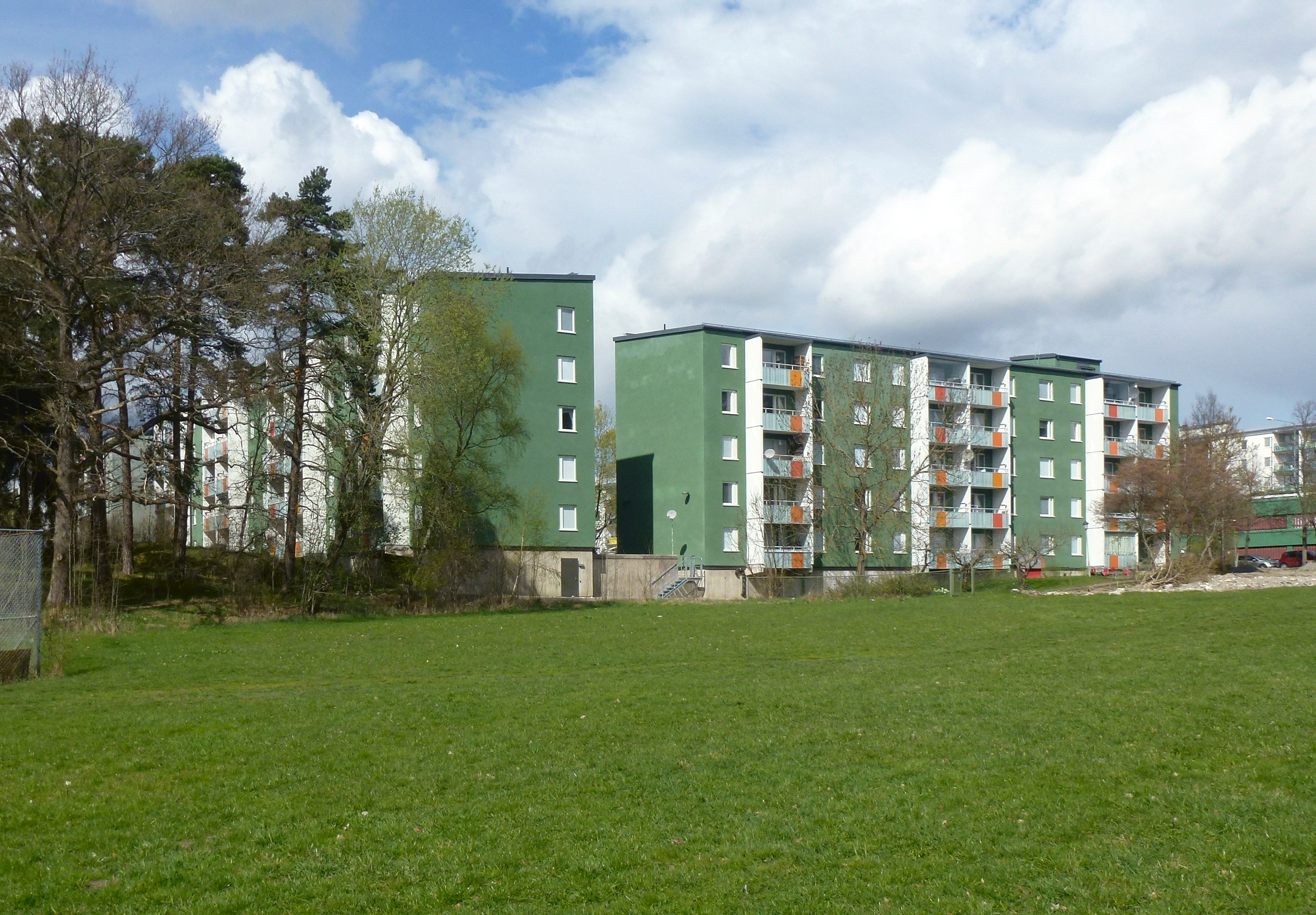
Typical plattenbau building from the 1970s in Husby

Husby is a district (Swedish: stadsdel) in the Järva borough in Stockholm, Sweden. Husby has 11,957 inhabitants as of December 31, 2023.

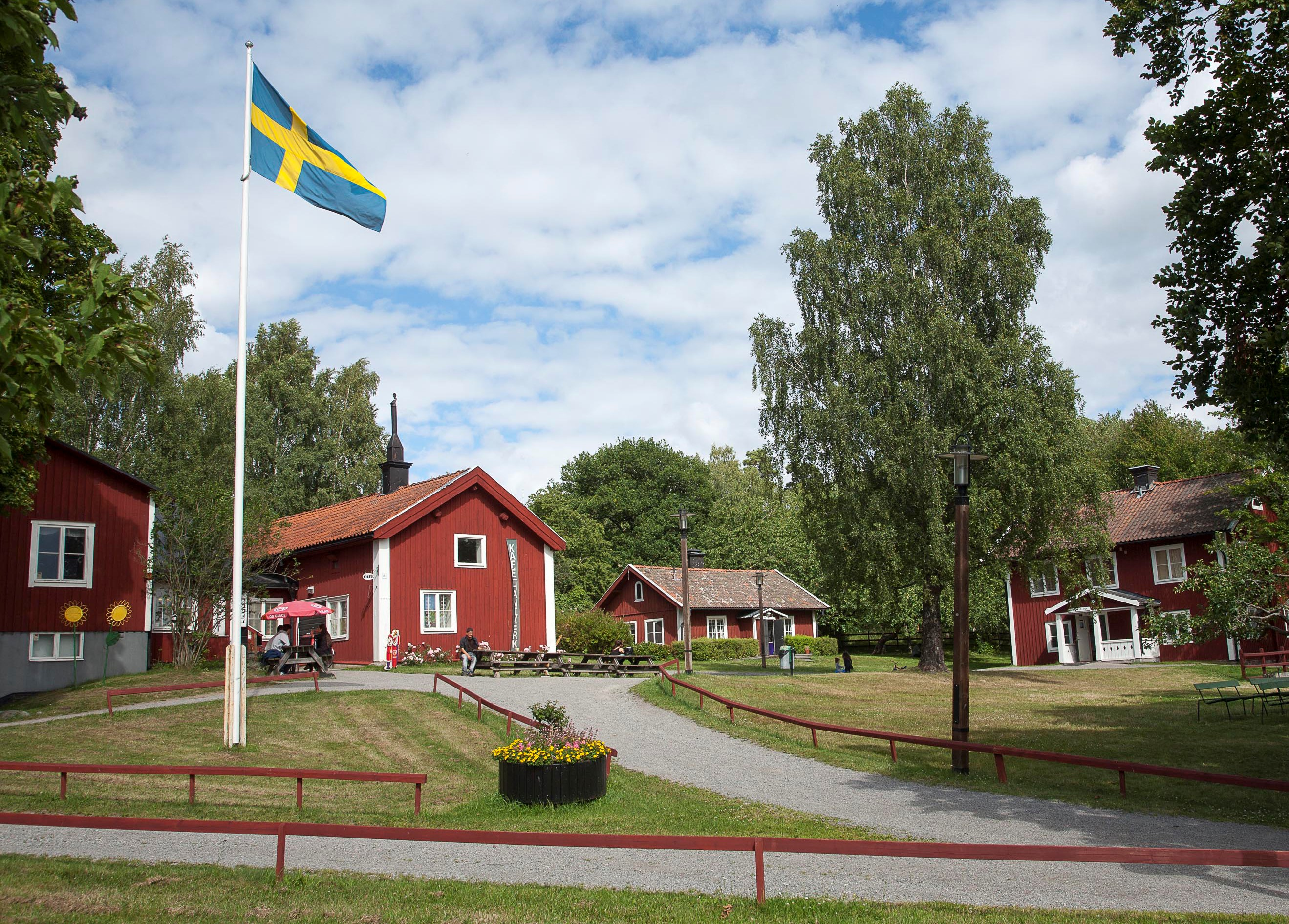
Husby Gård (known as Husby Art & Crafts Association)

== Location ==
Husby is situated in the northern part of Stockholm, within the Järvafältet area, and is bordered by Akalla to the northwest and Kista to the southeast. The area was originally a rural farmstead known as Husby Gård, established in the early 19th century. The land was acquired by the Swedish state in 1905 for military use but was later incorporated into the City of Stockholm in 1949. The modern construction of Husby began in 1972 as part of the Million Programme, a large-scale housing project, and was completed by 1977. The streets of Husby are named after cities in Norway e.g. Oslo, Bergen, Trondheim, Isafjord, etc. There are many runestones in the surroundings of Husby, dating back to the Viking times.

Husby is connected to the Stockholm Metro line via the blue line, with the journey taking approximately 20 minutes. The subway station was opened in 1977 and has two entrances, one in the main plaza of Husby, located in Trondheimsgatan, and the secondary one in Bergengatan.

== Demographics ==
A significant proportion of the population has a foreign background, with 76.9% of women and 74.1% of men having a non-Swedish background. It has had a majority foreign background population since 1991. The area is ethnically diverse, with residents originating from various parts of the world, including Asia, Africa, and Europe.

In 2024, 88.7% had a foreign background.

=== Education ===
The highest educational level achieved by the population aged 25–64 years is primarily at the secondary and post-secondary levels. The performance in Swedish, English, and mathematics in year 9 is varied, with a significant percentage of students transitioning to upper secondary school and higher education.

=== Housing ===
The majority of the housing in Husby consists of multi-family dwellings, with a variety of apartment sizes. The apartments are primarily owned by Svenska Bostäder, Victoriahem, SKB, Micasa, Sisab.

=== Socioeconomic Status ===
The Järva stadsdel (comprising Akalla, Bromsten, Flysta, Husby, Kista, Rinkeby, Solhem, Sundby and Tensta) has been reported to have lower income levels compared to other districts in Stockholm. The area has experienced in the past higher crime rates and feelings of insecurity among residents, especially after the closure of the closest police station to Husby, in Rinkeby, in 2014. The station was reopened on the first of September 2023. Ever since the police station in Rinkeby reopened, a significant amount of safety had increased and the areas have become safer, although crime still remains. On 30 December 2016, shopkeepers decided to protest by closing their businesses from 13:00 and onwards due to the high number of robberies targeting them and the police not taking sufficient actions to protect the neighborhood.

==== 2013 riots ====
In May 2013, the district was at the center of media attention, due to major riots that spread to several parts of Stockholm. Over the course of three days, approximately 129 cars were burned, garages were set on fire, and rioters engaged in sporadic clashes with the police.

In its December 2015 report, the Swedish police placed the district in its list of vulnerable areas of Sweden, where it still remains classified as a particularly vulnerable area, as of December 2023. The publication of the list of vulnerable areas in itself has been criticized by politicians and residents for stigmatizing the neighborhood and potentially dissuading investors, which could exacerbate socio-economic problems that the district might already be facing. Despite remaining on the list, the police have observed positive developments in Husby and the surrounding Järva area since 2021. Between 2022 and 2023, the number of shootings decreased by 65% compared to 2020–2021, attributed to increased collaboration between the police, local authorities, property owners, and civil society. Surveys have also indicated that residents’ sense of safety has increased, reflecting the effectiveness of systematic safety initiatives in the community.

== Local Amenities and Activities ==
Husby offers various local amenities and activities. The district has a central square with shops and restaurants, and nearby Järvafältet provides fields and forests for outdoor activities. Notable facilities include Husby Gård, which features a café, playground, and art exhibition center; Husbybadet, an indoor waterpark; and Husby Ishall, an indoor ice rink used for ice hockey and other winter sports.

== Community Initiatives ==
Efforts have been made to improve the quality of life in Husby through community initiatives. These include free activities such as art exhibitions at Husby Konsthall, pop-up summer squares, and open preschools. Additionally, local sports clubs offer free drop-in sessions for handball and soccer, and there are opportunities for ice skating and cross-country skiing in the area.

== Notable people from Husby ==
- Patrik Isaksson (singer)

== See also ==
- Husby metro station
