= Blue Line (Stockholm Metro) =

Metro line in Stockholm, Sweden

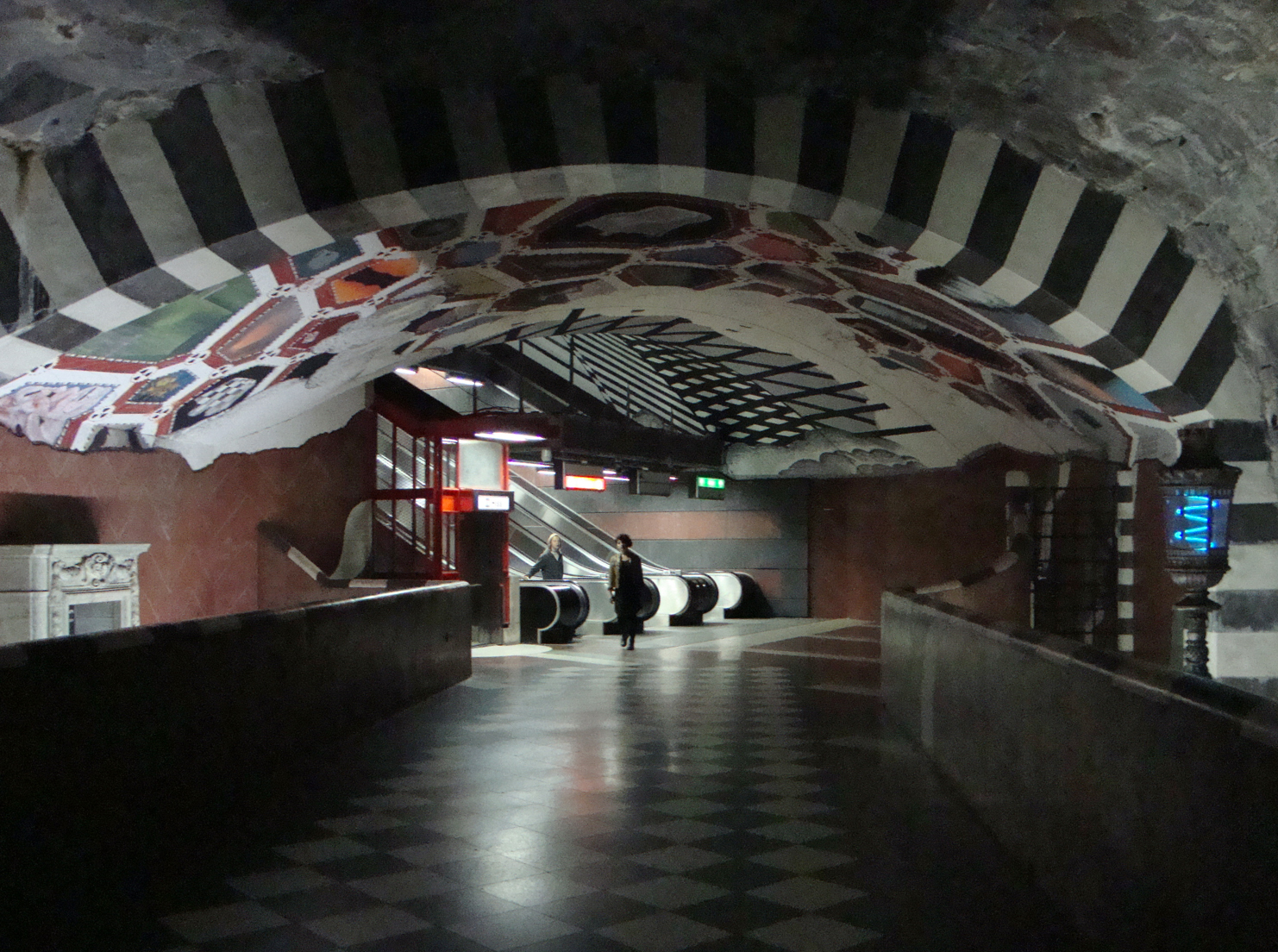
- Kungsträdgården station

Overview
- Native name: Blå linjen
- Locale: Stockholm, Sweden
- Stations: 20 + 9 under construction + 1 unopened

Service
- Type: Rapid transit
- System: Storstockholms Lokaltrafik (SL)
- Services: Kungsträdgården–Hjulsta; Kungsträdgården–Akalla
- Depot: Rissne
- Daily ridership: 204,700 (2018)

History
- Opened: 31 August 1975; 51 years ago
- Last extension: 1985

Technical
- Line length: 25.5 km (15.8 mi)
- Number of tracks: 2
- Character: Underground subway and at–grade-separated
- Track gauge: 1,435 mm (4 ft 8 1/2 in) standard gauge
- Electrification: 750 V DC third rail

The Blue Line (Swedish: Blå linjen; officially Metro 3, but called Tub 3 ("Tube 3", or abbreviation for "Tunnelbana 3") internally) is one of the three Stockholm Metro lines. It is 25.5 kilometres (15.8 miles) long, and runs from Kungsträdgården via T-Centralen to Västra skogen where it branches in two, and continues to Hjulsta and Akalla as lines 10 and 11 respectively.

== History ==
Groundbreaking occurred on 2 September 1966 and the line was opened nine years later on 31 August 1975, between T-Centralen and Hjulsta via Hallonbergen. On 5 June 1977, the branch from Hallonbergen to Akalla opened, and on 30 October the same year, the line was extended in the opposite direction from T-Centralen to Kungsträdgården. The next section opened, on 19 August 1985, was between Västra skogen and Rinkeby via Sundbybergs centrum. At that time, Line 10 was diverted over this section, and no more passenger trains operated on the Hallonbergen–Rinkeby section. Since then, the section has only been used for access to the depot in Rissne.

The primary reason for constructing the line was the need for public transport to serve the newly-built large residential areas in the northwestern part of Stockholm, built during the period 1965–1975. Several of these areas, however, were without rapid transit during the first years because the opening of the Metro was delayed until 1975. During those years Tensta and Rinkeby were served by feeder buses from Spånga station.

The Blue Line was more costly to build than the previous lines because the general requirements for building design increased over the years. The total cost of the Blue Line was approximately 1.4 billion kr in 1975 currency.

=== Opening dates ===
Section	Date
T-Centralen–Hallonbergen–Hjulsta	Sunday 31 August 1975
Hallonbergen–Akalla	Sunday 5 June 1977
T-Centralen–Kungsträdgården	Sunday 30 October 1977
Västra skogen–Sundbybergs centrum–Rinkeby	Monday 19 August 1985
Akalla–Barkarby	(December 2027)
Kungsträdgården–Nacka; Kungsträdgården–Hagsätra	(2030)

== Extensions under construction ==
=== Akalla to Barkarby ===
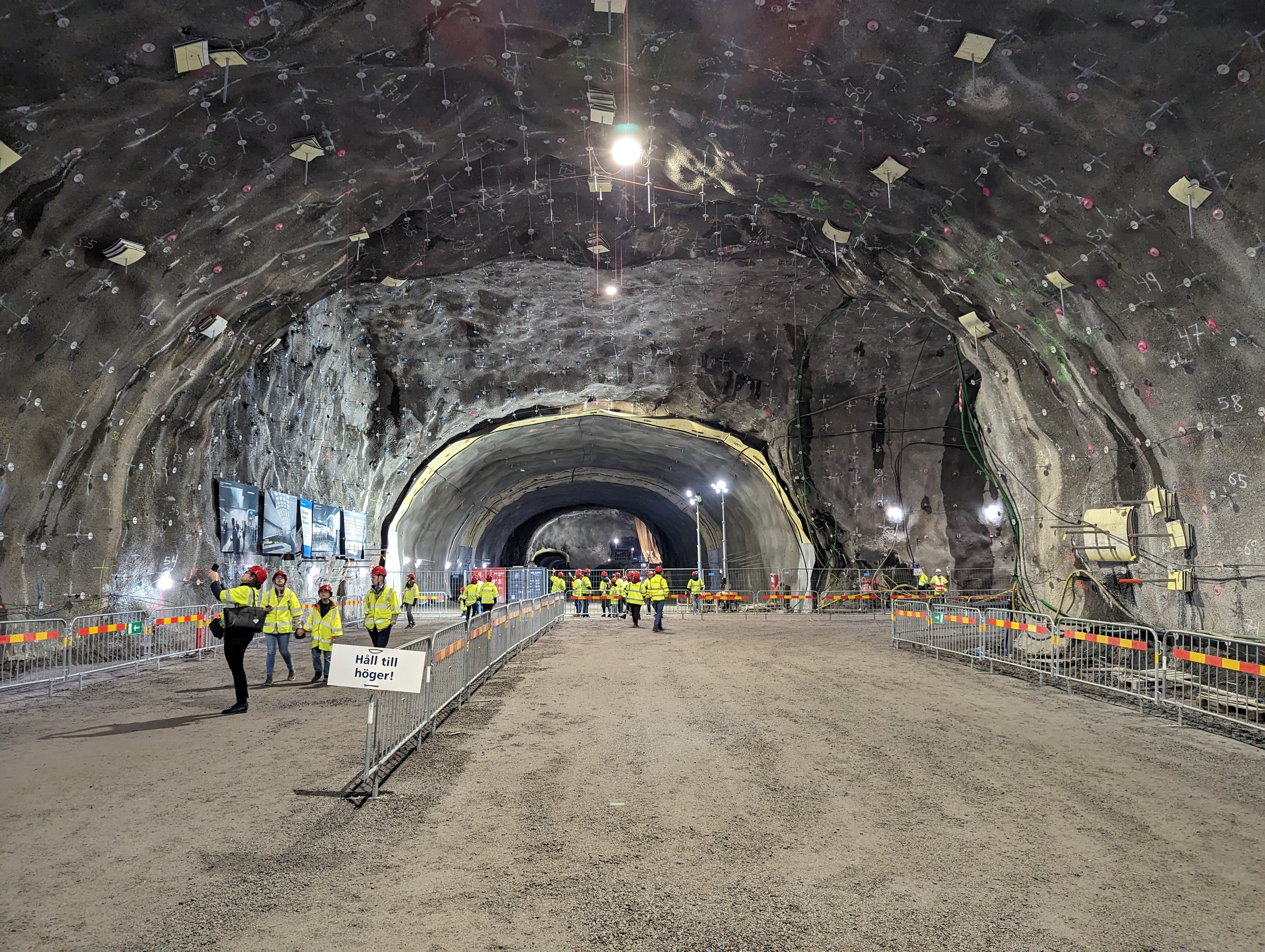
Construction of Barkarby metro station in 2023

The Blue Line is being extended approximately 4 kilometres from Akalla to Barkarby station, with two new stations at Barkarbystaden and Barkarby. The extension will serve the new Barkarbystaden district and provide an interchange with the existing commuter rail station at Barkarby. The official groundbreaking took place in August 2018.

The extension is being constructed entirely underground. Tunnel excavation between Akalla and Barkarby was completed in January 2023, after which construction shifted towards fitting out the tunnels and building the stations, entrances and technical systems. The Barkarbystaden station is approximately 30 metres below ground and has a single island platform. In 2026, track installation and station fitting-out are under way.

The Barkarby station will provide a direct interchange with the railway station and the surrounding bus services. The extension is scheduled to open for passenger service in December 2027.

=== Kungsträdgården to Nacka and Söderort ===
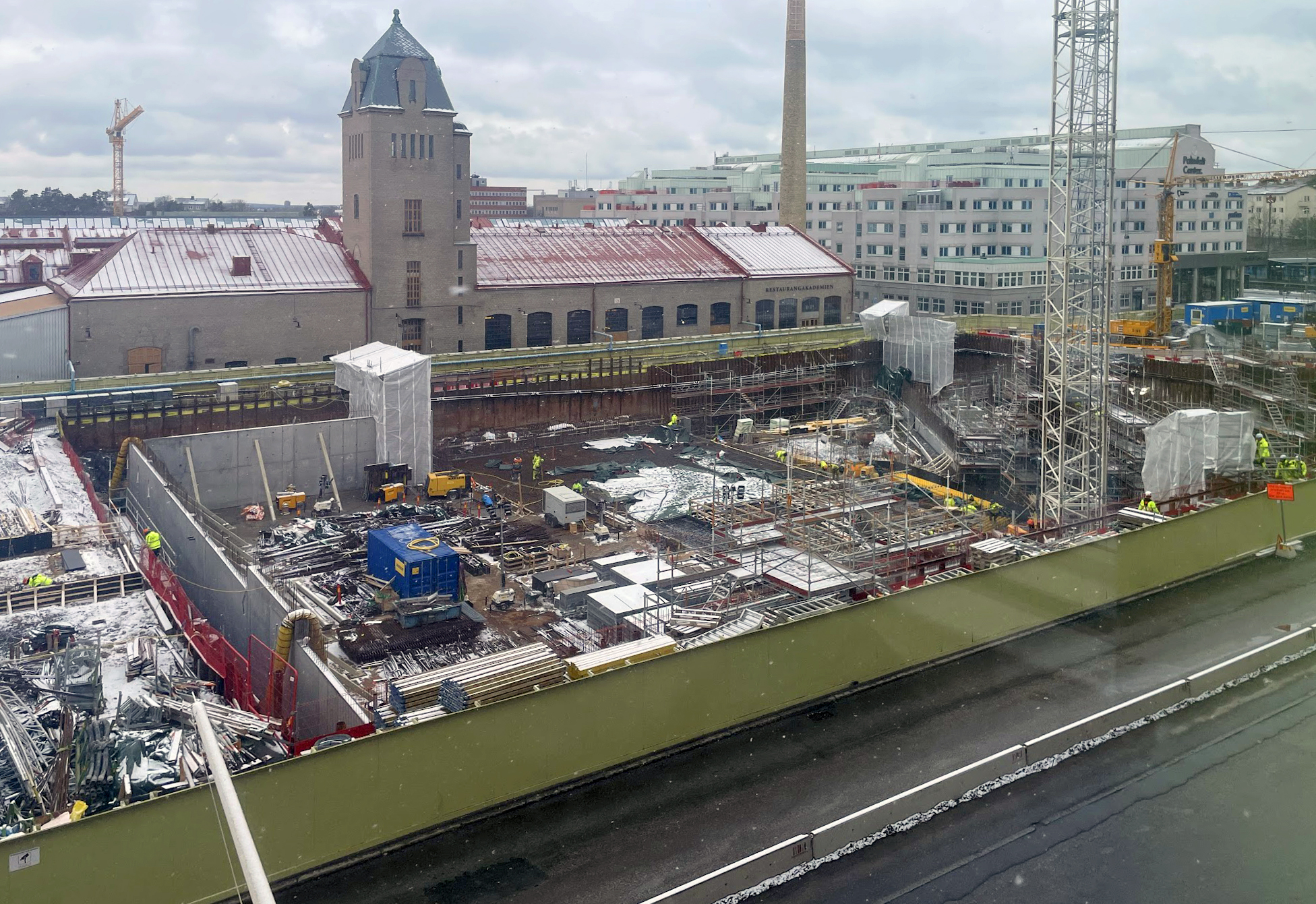
Slakthusområdet station under construction in 2025

As part of the 2013 Stockholm negotiation, the Blue Line is being extended from Kungsträdgården to Nacka and Sockenplan. The two extensions share the section from Kungsträdgården to Sofia, where the line divides into a branch towards Nacka and a branch towards Söderort.

==== Nacka branch ====
The Nacka branch will run from Sofia beneath the Hammarby Canal at Hammarby kanal station, followed by Sickla, Järla and Nacka. Hammarby kanal station is being constructed approximately 35–40 metres below the canal and will have entrances on both Södermalm and Hammarby Sjöstad. The station will also provide an interchange with Tvärbanan at Luma.

The tunnels beneath Hammarby kanal were completed in April 2024, when the tunnelling teams from the north and south met approximately 41.5 metres below the surface. Construction of the stations and railway systems is continuing, with passenger service on the Nacka branch scheduled to begin in 2030.

==== Söderort branch ====
The Söderort branch will run from Sofia via Gullmarsplan and Slakthusområdet to Sockenplan. At Sockenplan it will connect with the existing Hagsätra branch, which will be transferred from the Green Line to the Blue Line. The new Slakthusområdet station will replace the existing Globen and Enskede gård stations.

Slakthusområdet station is being built approximately 50 metres below ground and will have two entrances. The northern entrance will be located near Rökerigatan, while the southern entrance will be at Hallvägen and Charkmästargatan. The station's tunnels to the north and south have been excavated, while construction of the station entrances and other infrastructure continues. The Söderort branch is scheduled to open in 2030.

== Route ==
At 25.516 kilometres (15.855 mi), the Blue Line is the shortest of the Stockholm Metro; however, the entire line is north of the Mälaren. Line 10 runs between Kungsträdgården and Hjulsta and includes 14 stations. Line 11 runs between Kungsträdgården and Akalla and includes a total of 12 stations (ignoring the Kymlinge "ghost station" which was never completed). Six of the stations are served by both lines. The Blue Line carries an average of about 204,700 passengers per day (2019), or 55 million per year (2005).

=== Stations ===
In total, the Blue Line has 20 stations, of which 19 are underground and one (Kista) is on the surface. The tunnel between Hjulsta and Kungsträdgården is the longest of the system at 14.3 kilometres (8.9 miles), and is also Sweden's longest tunnel. (However, metro tunnels are usually omitted from lists of the country's tunnels.) Although the Blue Line is almost entirely in tunnel, it also has the Metro's longest elevated section at Kista, 1,200 metres (3,900 ft) long.

The 11 busiest stations (by number of boardings on a winter weekday in 2019) are:

Rank	Station	Passengers
1	T-Centralen	39,800
2	Fridhemsplan	20,250
3	Kista	19,800
4	Stadshagen	14,050
5	Rådhuset	13,100
6	Sundbybergs centrum	12,300
7	Solna centrum	11,400
8	Kungsträdgården	9,850
9	Västra skogen	7,850
10	Hallonbergen	7,350
11	Tensta	6,350
