= Lessertia (spider) =

Scientific classification
- Kingdom: Animalia
- Phylum: Arthropoda
- Subphylum: Chelicerata
- Class: Arachnida
- Order: Araneae
- Infraorder: Araneomorphae
- Family: Linyphiidae
- Genus: Lessertia; Smith, 1908

Type species
- L. dentichelis (Simon, 1884)

Species
- L. barbara (Simon, 1884) – Spain, Morocco, Algeria; L. dentichelis (Simon, 1884) – Canary Is., Madeira, Europe, Turkey. Introduced to Canada, New Zealand

Synonyms
- Scotoneta Simon, 1910

Genus of spiders

Lessertia is a genus of dwarf spiders that was first described by F. P. Smith in 1908. As of May 2019 it contains only two species, both found in Algeria, Canada, Morocco, New Zealand, Portugal, Spain, and Turkey: L. barbara and L. dentichelis.
