= Elis Eriksson =

Swedish artist and writer (1906–2006)

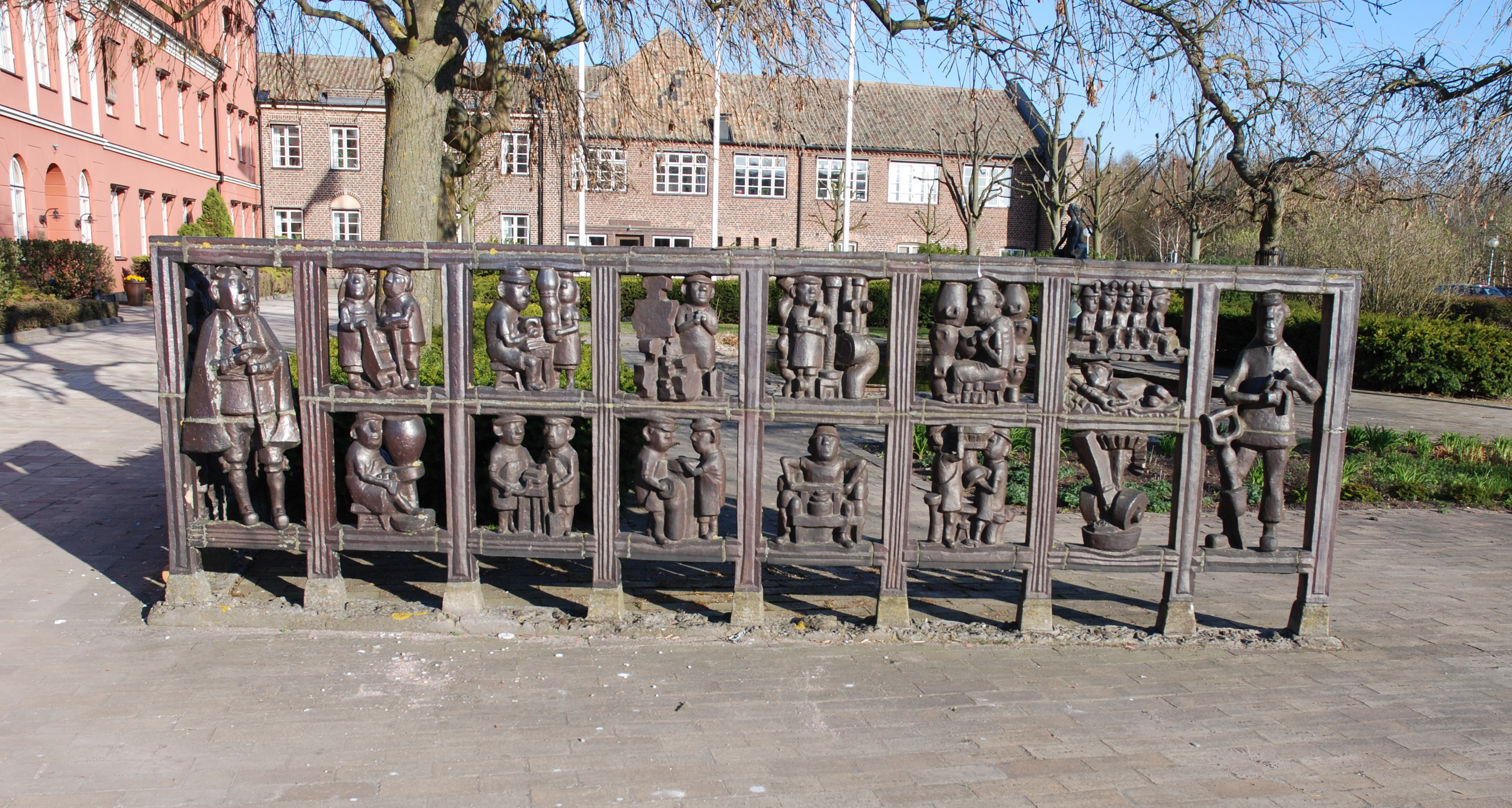
Elis Eriksson's Stengodsspaljé, Höganäs, Sweden

Elis Ernst Eriksson (22 August 1906 – 4 January 2006) was a Swedish artist, sculptor and writer.

He was born in Stockholm and studied there at the Royal University College of Fine Arts in 1934–1939. He had his first solo exhibition in 1959. His work is commonly described as experimental or anarchic, stylistically akin to Dadaist art. He was awarded the Prince Eugen Medal for sculpture in 1981.

He made his prose debut with the book Nattens hundar. Later writings include Pavan, a series of books about a character who first appeared in Eriksson's 1965 installation Indijaner å en kåvvbåj.
