= Akalla metro station =

Stockholm Metro station

Akalla

General information
- Coordinates: 59°24′52″N 17°54′52″E
- System: Stockholm Metro station
- Owner: Storstockholms Lokaltrafik
- Platforms: 1 island platform
- Tracks: 2

Construction
- Structure type: Underground
- Depth: 20 m (66 ft)
- Accessible: Yes

Other information
- Station code: AKA

History
- Opened: 5 June 1977; 49 years ago

Passengers
- 2019: 6,300 boarding per weekday (metro)

Services
Preceding station	Stockholm Metro	Following station
Husby towards Kungsträdgården	Line 11	Terminus
Location
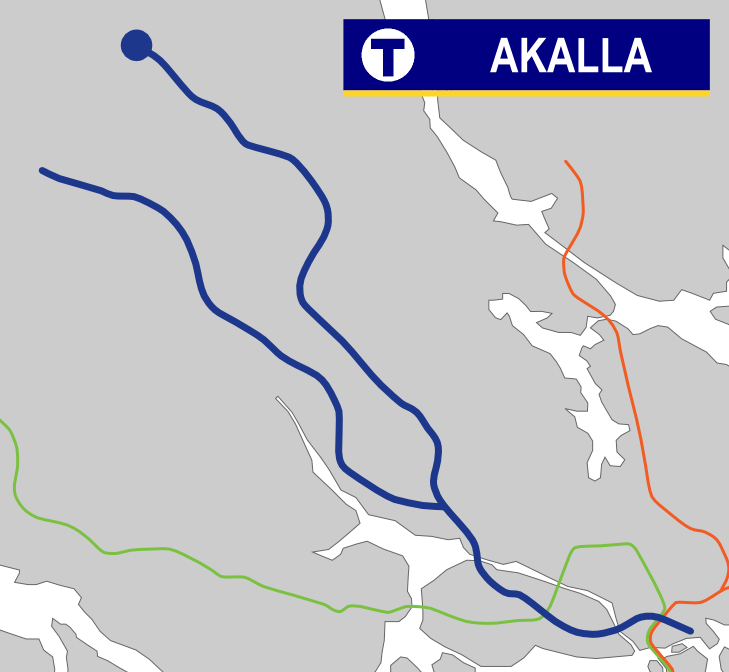

Akalla is a station on the Stockholm Metro in the Akalla district of Stockholm. The station was opened on 5 June 1977 as the northern terminus of the extension of the Blue Line from Hallonbergen. This is the final stop on Line 11 of the Blue Line.

As part of Art in the Stockholm Metro project, the station features an ochre coloured grotto. The work includes ceramic pictures illustrating the ideals, daily life, leisure and work of all people, created by Birgit Ståhl-Nyberg in 1977.

== Expansion ==
A new extension to Barkarby is under construction and when completed Akalla will no longer function as a terminating station. In August of 2018 construction started, including a 4 km tunnel that was finished in early 2025. Traffic is planned to start in 2027, and services will be on the blue line.

Year	Milestone
2018	Construction of tunnel Akalla → Barkarby.
2019-2023	Tunnels are blasted and station construction has started.
2025	The tunnels have been fully excavated.
2026-2027	Tests and final assembly of tracks, lifts and escalators.
2027	Expected commencements of services.

== Buses ==
Several bus stops lay in connection to the station including Akalla T‑Bana and Akalla bussterminal.

Lines
Line	Route	Stop in Akalla	Notes
155 & 155X	Brommaplan ↔ Akalla	Akalla Bussterminal	X stands for Express service which has fewer stops.
175	Barkarby Station ↔ Akalla	Akalla Bussterminal	connects Akalla to the Pendeltåg network.
178	Mörby station ↔ Jakobsbergs station	Akalla T-bana	Via Akalla
197	Sollentuna station ↔ Stockholm C	Akalla bussterminal	
517	Spånga station ↔ Kista Centrum	Akalla T-Bana	
518	Kista Gård ↔ Vällingby T‑bana	Akalla bussterminal	
567	Jakobsberg station ↔ Sollentuna station	Akalla bussterminal	

== Gallery ==
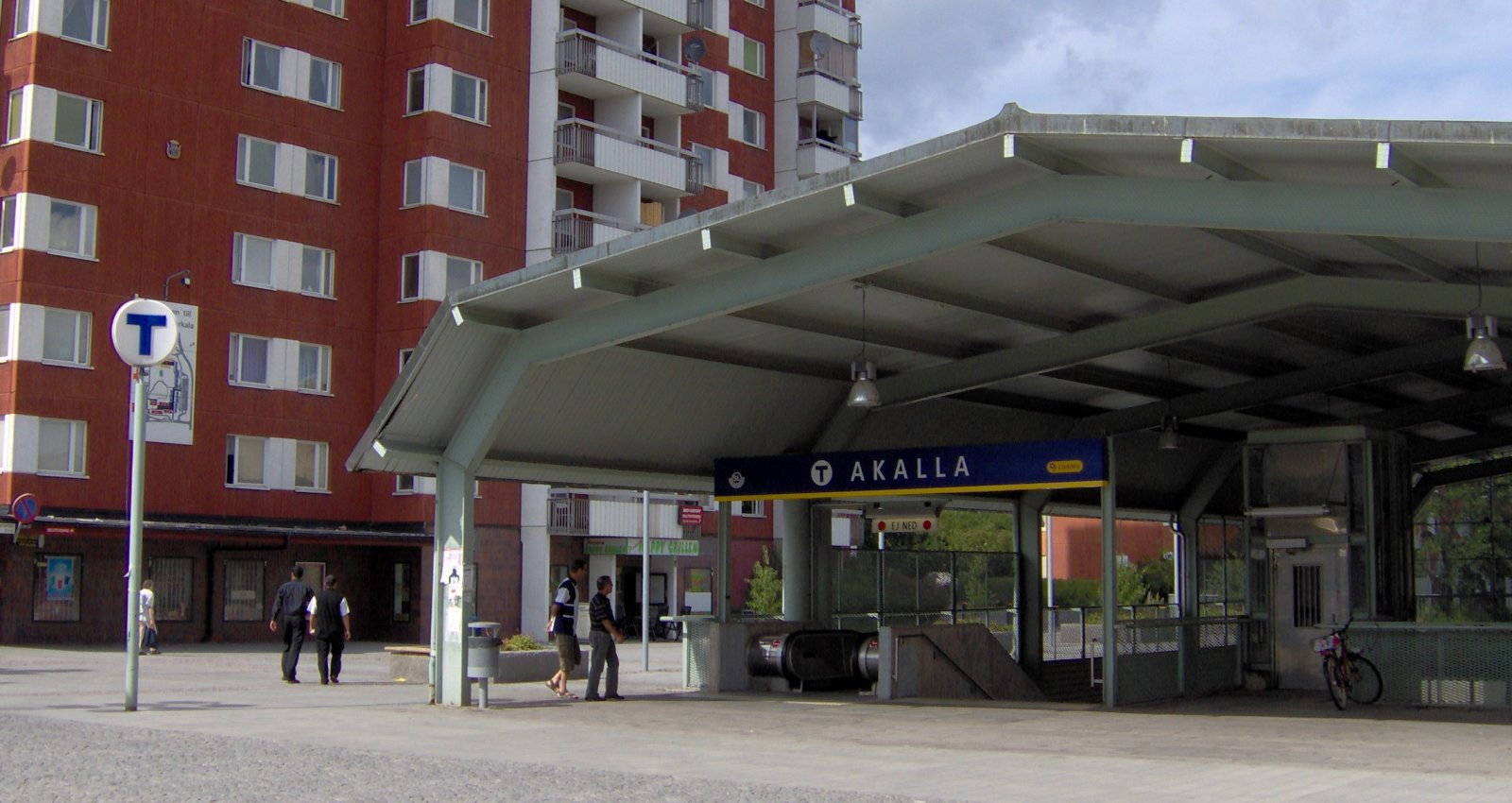

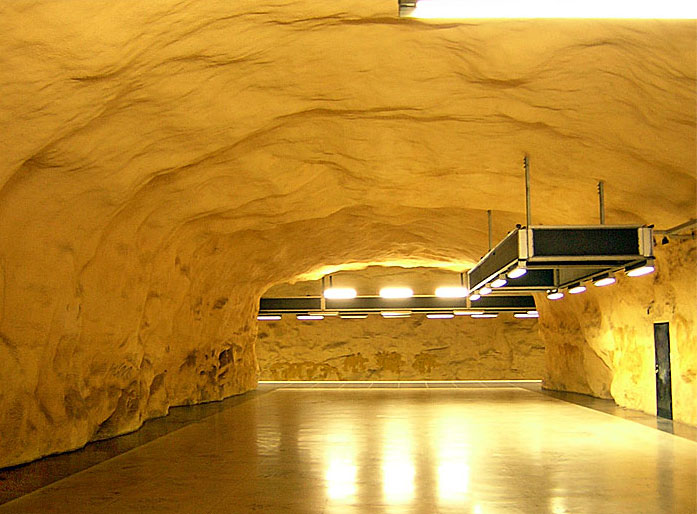

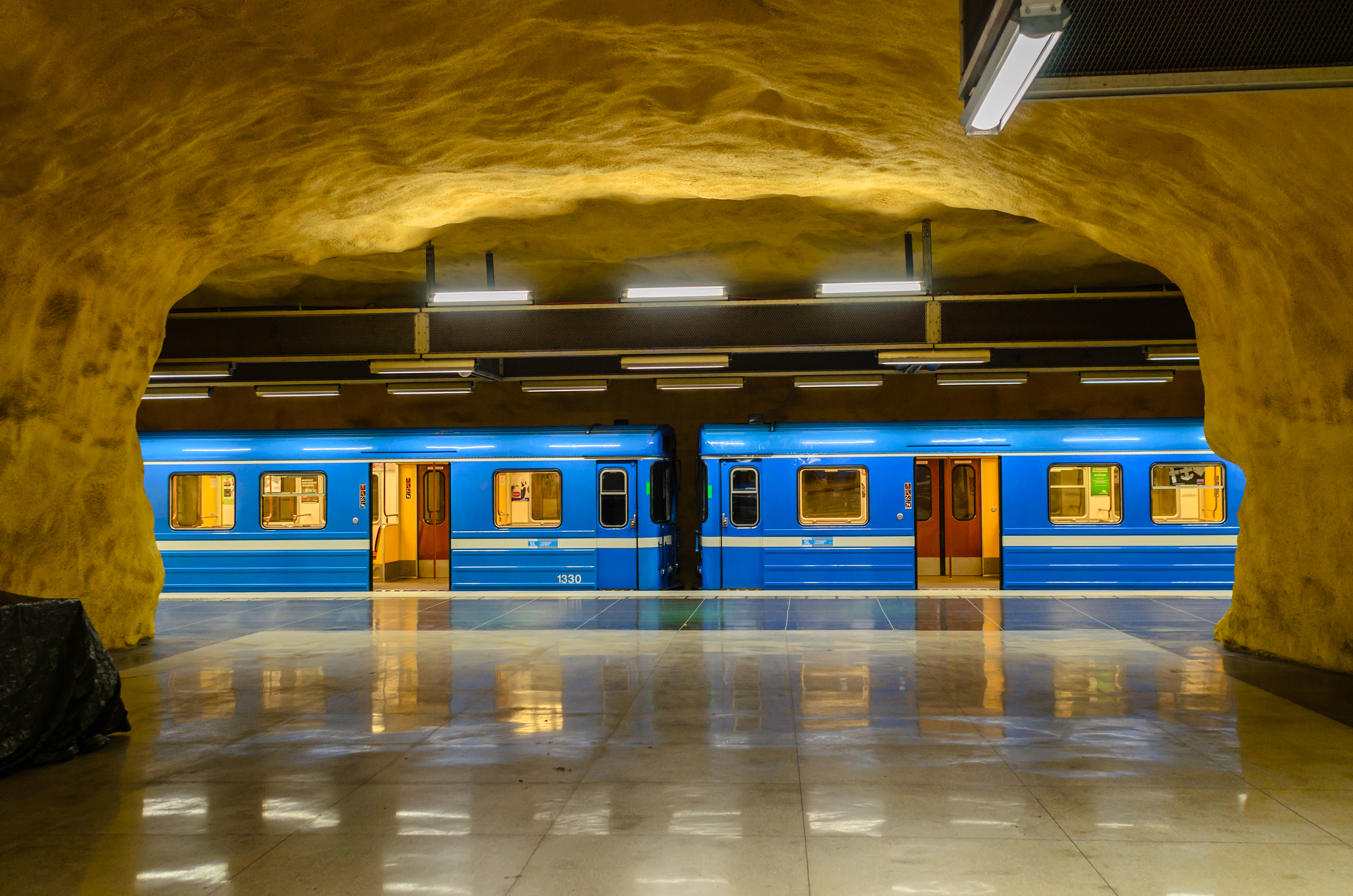
