= Sankt Eriksplan =

Square in Stockholm, Sweden

Coordinates: 59°20′22″N 18°02′19″E

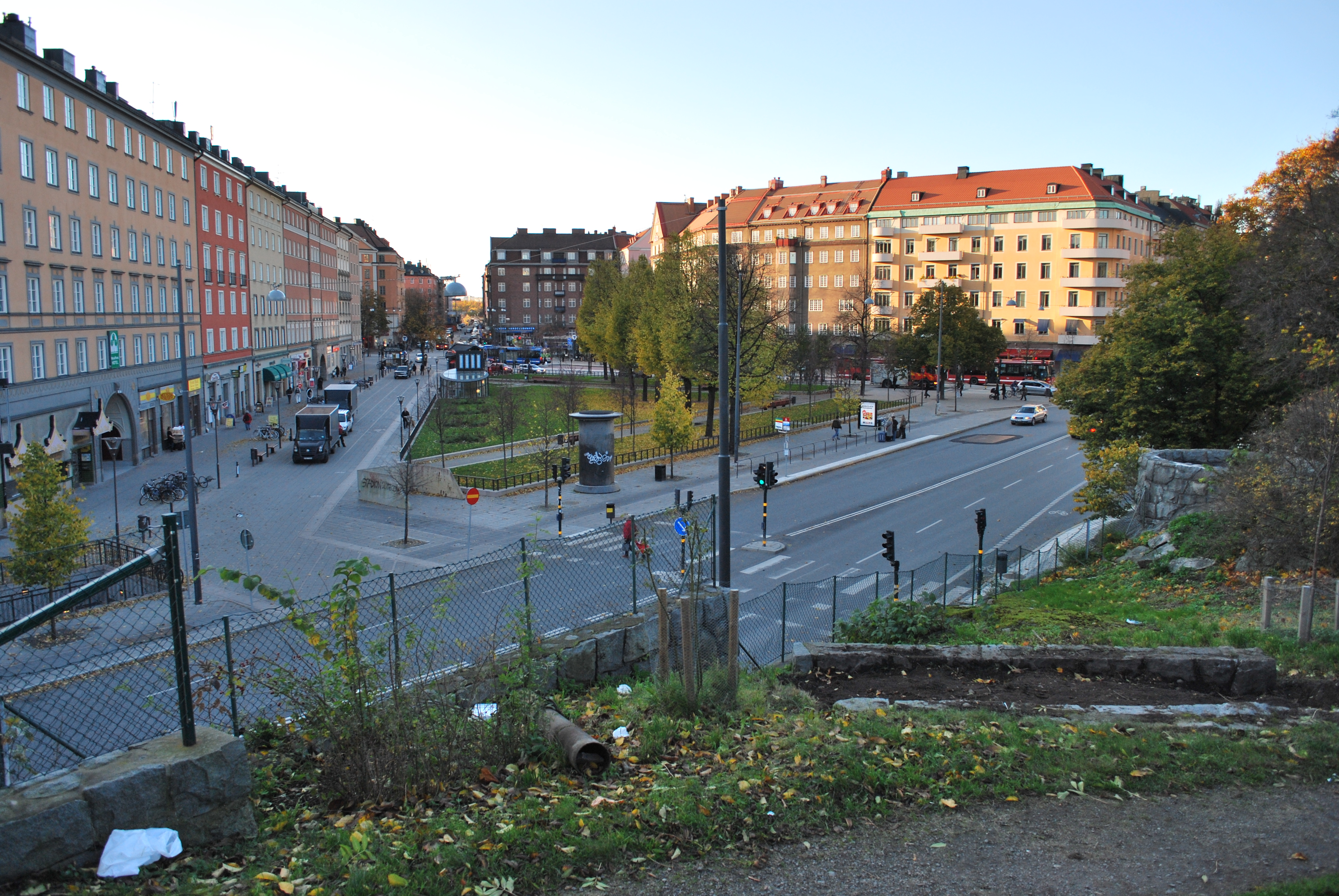
Sankt Eriksplan seen from Vasaparken

Sankt Eriksplan is a square in the district of Vasastaden in Stockholm, Sweden.

== History ==
Saint Erik's Plaza was called so after King Erik IX who is the patron saint of Stockholm and depicted in the city's coat of arms.

Sankt Eriksplan metro station was opened in 1952 and is on the green line between Odenplan and Fridhemsplan. Popular venues close to Sankt Eriksplan include Filadelfiakyrkan ('the Philadelphia Church') which offers frequent concerts. Nearby is the riverside park of Karlberg Palace (Karlbergs slott) which was built in 1630. It is in sight of the Military Academy Karlberg which was inaugurated in 1792. Sankt Eriksplan is a popular and expensive residential area, with apartment prices being among the most expensive in Stockholm.

It also appeared in the 2012 hit video game Cry of Fear as an inspiration for an area in of the game's many levels "Saxon Avenue"

In 2017, Low Roar released a song named after the metro station, "St. Eriksplan".
