= Stadshagen =

Coordinates: 59.335°N 18.015°E

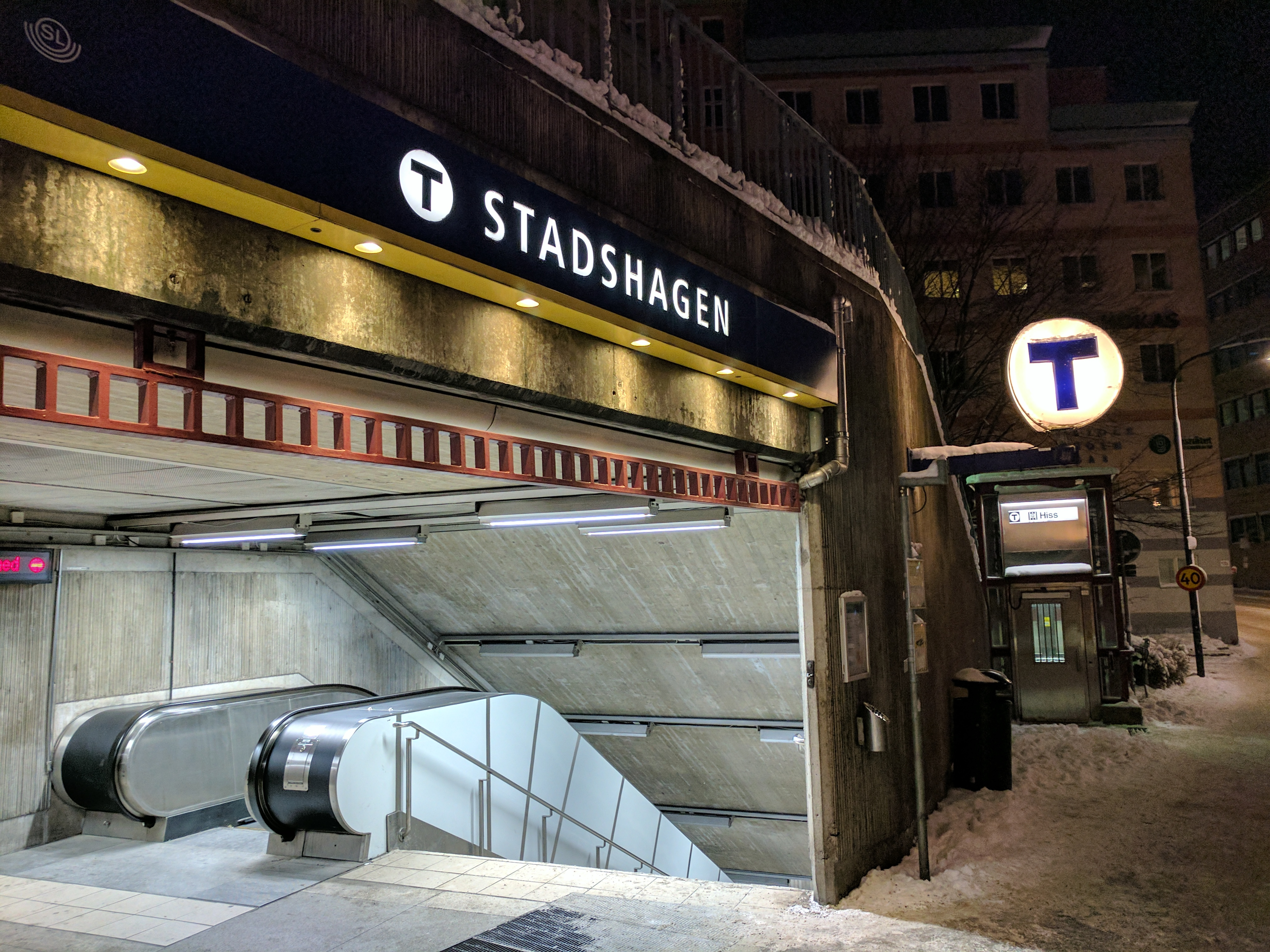
One of the entrances to Stadshagen metro station

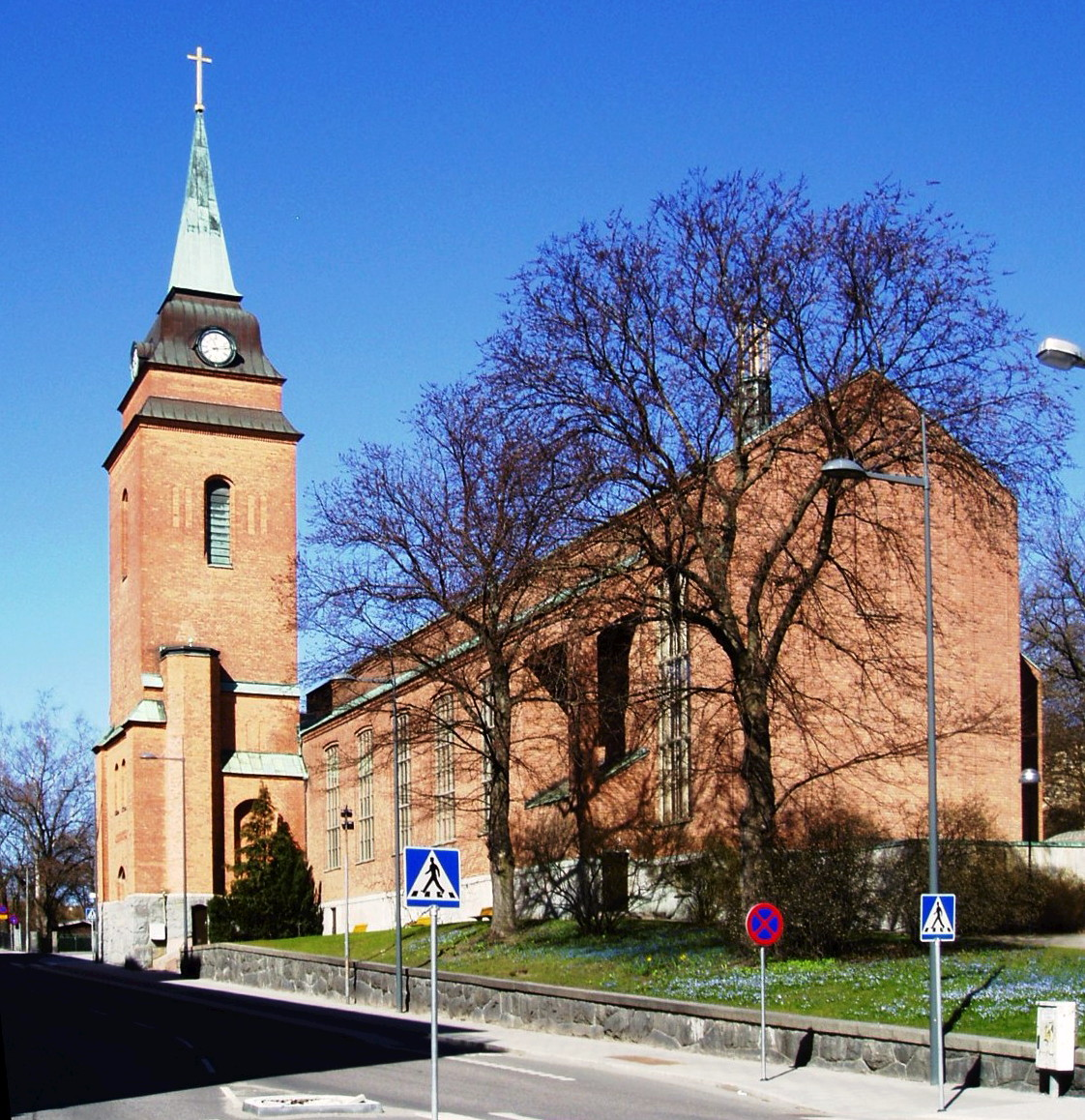
Saint Göran Church

Stadshagen is a district in Stockholm Municipality in Stockholm, Sweden.

== Location ==
Stadshagen is located in the northwest part of the island of Kungsholmen. Stadshagen borders the districts of Kungsholmen through Lilla Västerbron, Marieberg and Igeldammsgatan; Kristineberg through Lindhagensgatan; Marieberg through part of Rålambshovsleden and to Huvudsta in Solna municipality through the Karlbergskanalen.

== History ==
One of Stockholm's major hospitals, Saint Göran Hospital (Sankt Görans Sjukhus), opened in 1888 in this district. Saint Göran Church (Sankt Görans kyrka) first opened in 1910 as a chapel designed by architect Gustaf Améen (1864–1949). The present church was designed by architect Adrian Langendal (1904-1970) and was inaugurated in 1958.

The Blue line metro station of Stadshagen was opened in 1975 between Fridhemsplan and Västra skogen. Stadshagen metro station was inaugurated on 31 August 1975.
