= Stadshagen metro station =

Stockholm Metro station

Stadshagen
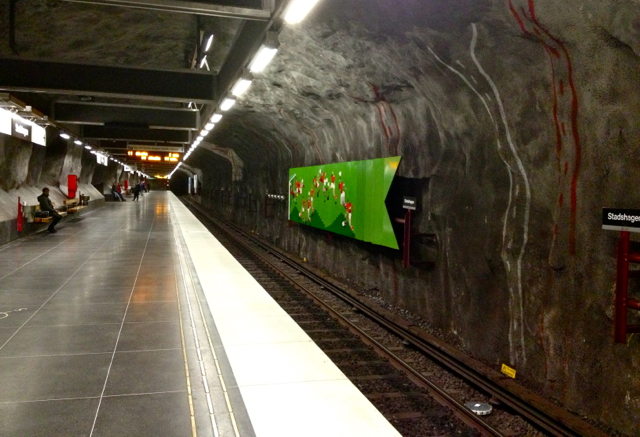

General information
- Location: Stadshagen, Stockholm
- Coordinates: 59°20′14″N 18°01′04″E
- Elevation: 2.1 m (6.9 ft) above sea level
- System: Stockholm Metro station
- Owner: Storstockholms Lokaltrafik
- Platforms: 1 island platform
- Tracks: 2

Construction
- Structure type: Underground
- Accessible: Yes

Other information
- Station code: SHA

History
- Opened: 31 August 1975; 51 years ago

Passengers
- 2019: 14,050 boarding per weekday

Services
| Preceding station | Stockholm Metro | Following station |
|---|---|---|
| Fridhemsplan towards Kungsträdgården | Line 10 | Västra skogen towards Hjulsta |
| Fridhemsplan towards Kungsträdgården | Line 11 | Västra skogen towards Akalla |
Location
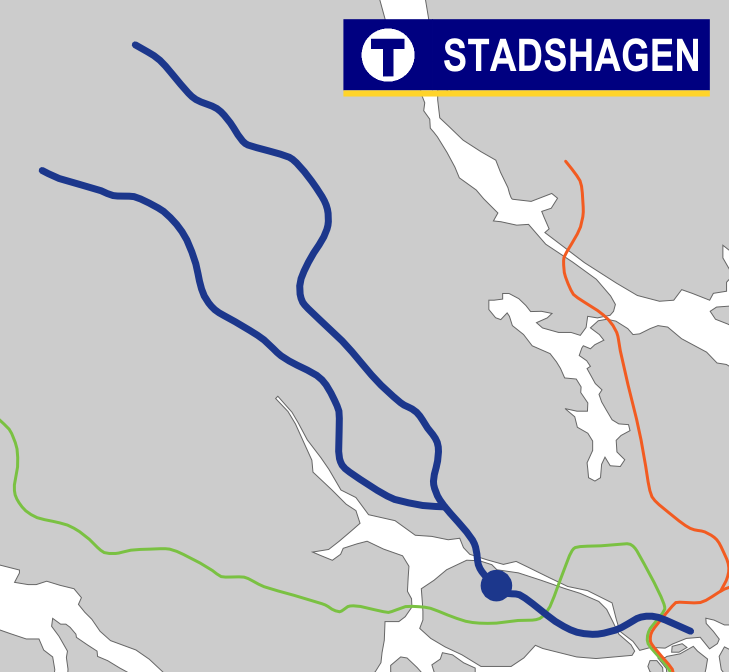

Stadshagen metro station is a station on the Blue Line of the Stockholm Metro, located in the district of Stadshagen. The station was inaugurated on 31 August 1975 as part the first stretch of the Blue Line between T-Centralen and Hjulsta. The trains were running via Hallonbergen and Rinkeby. The distance to Kungsträdgården is 3 km (1.9 mi).

== Gallery ==
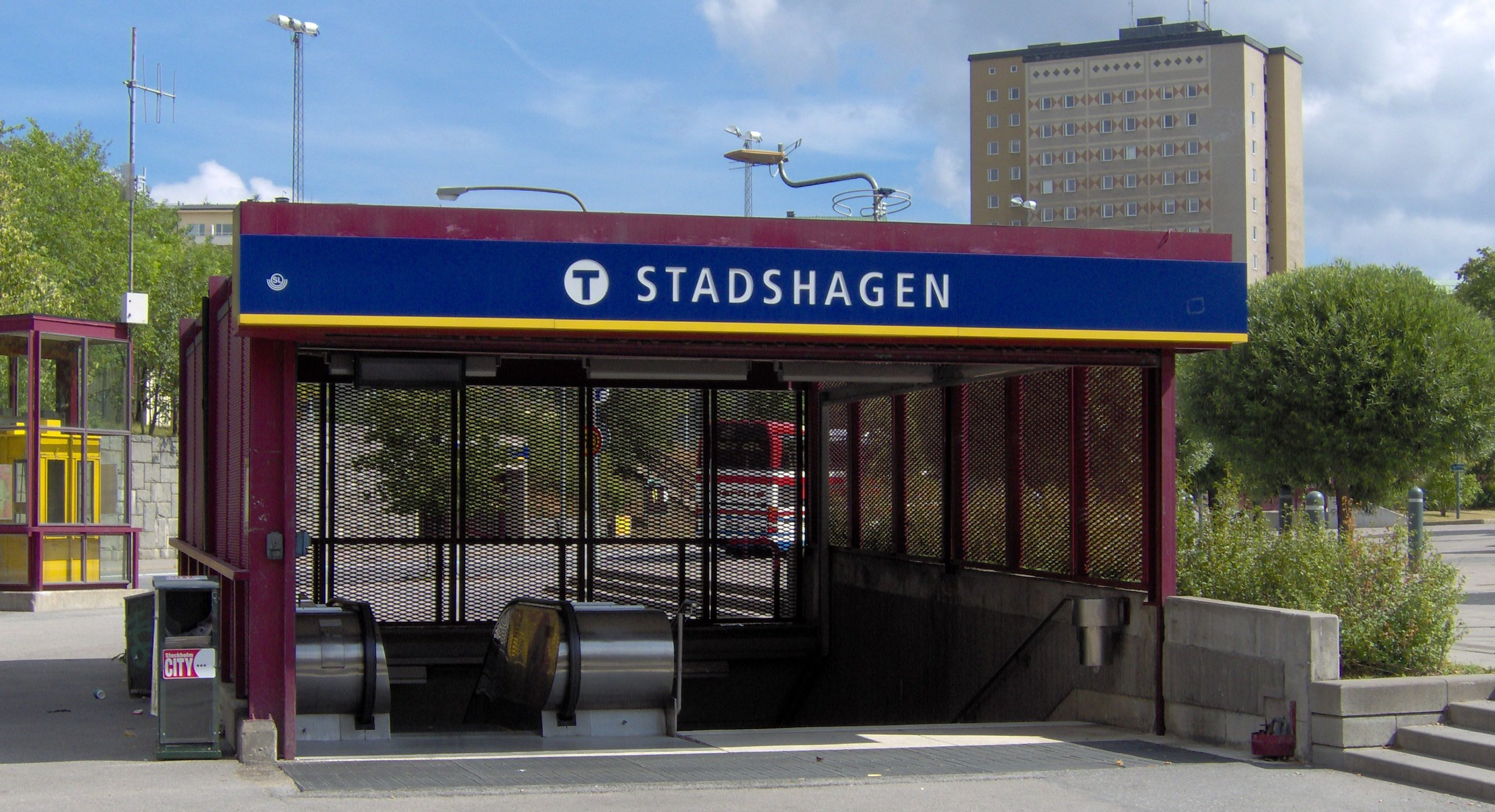

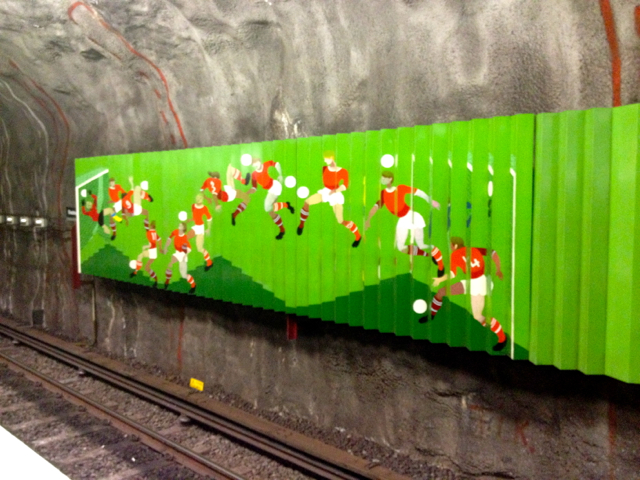
Station's artwork by Lasse Lindqvist

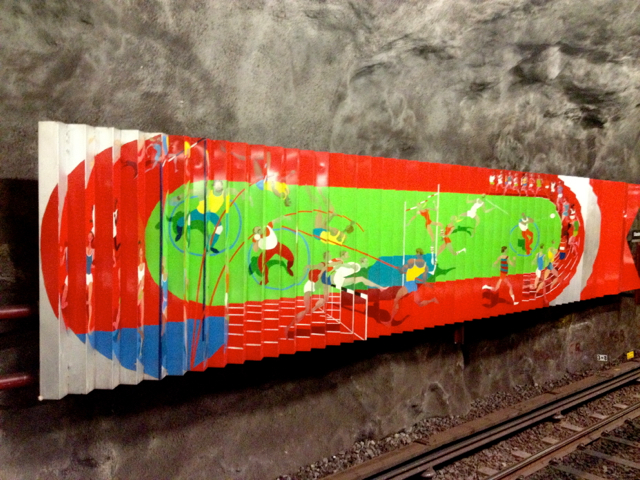

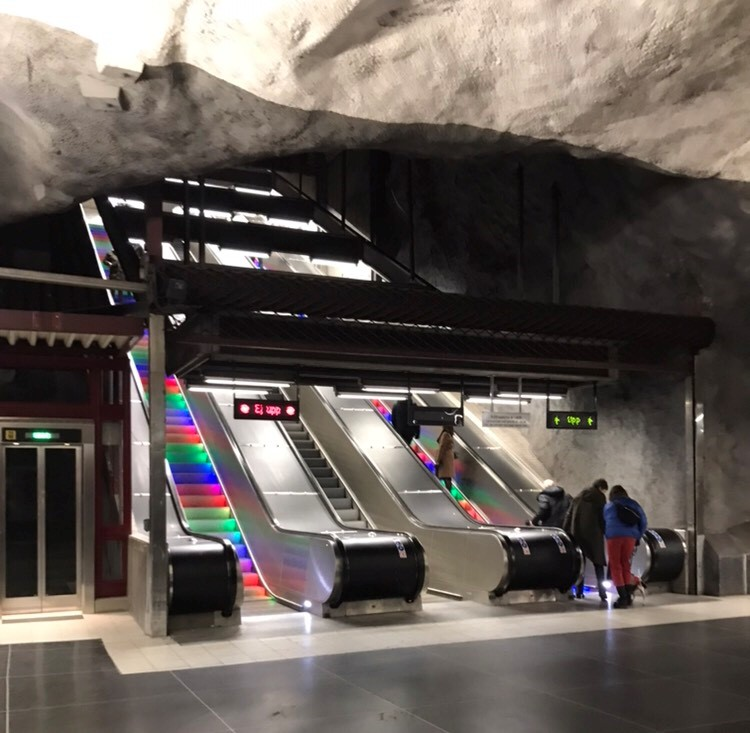
The escalators at Stadshagen Metro Station.
