= Fridhemsplan metro station =

Stockholm Metro station

Fridhemsplan
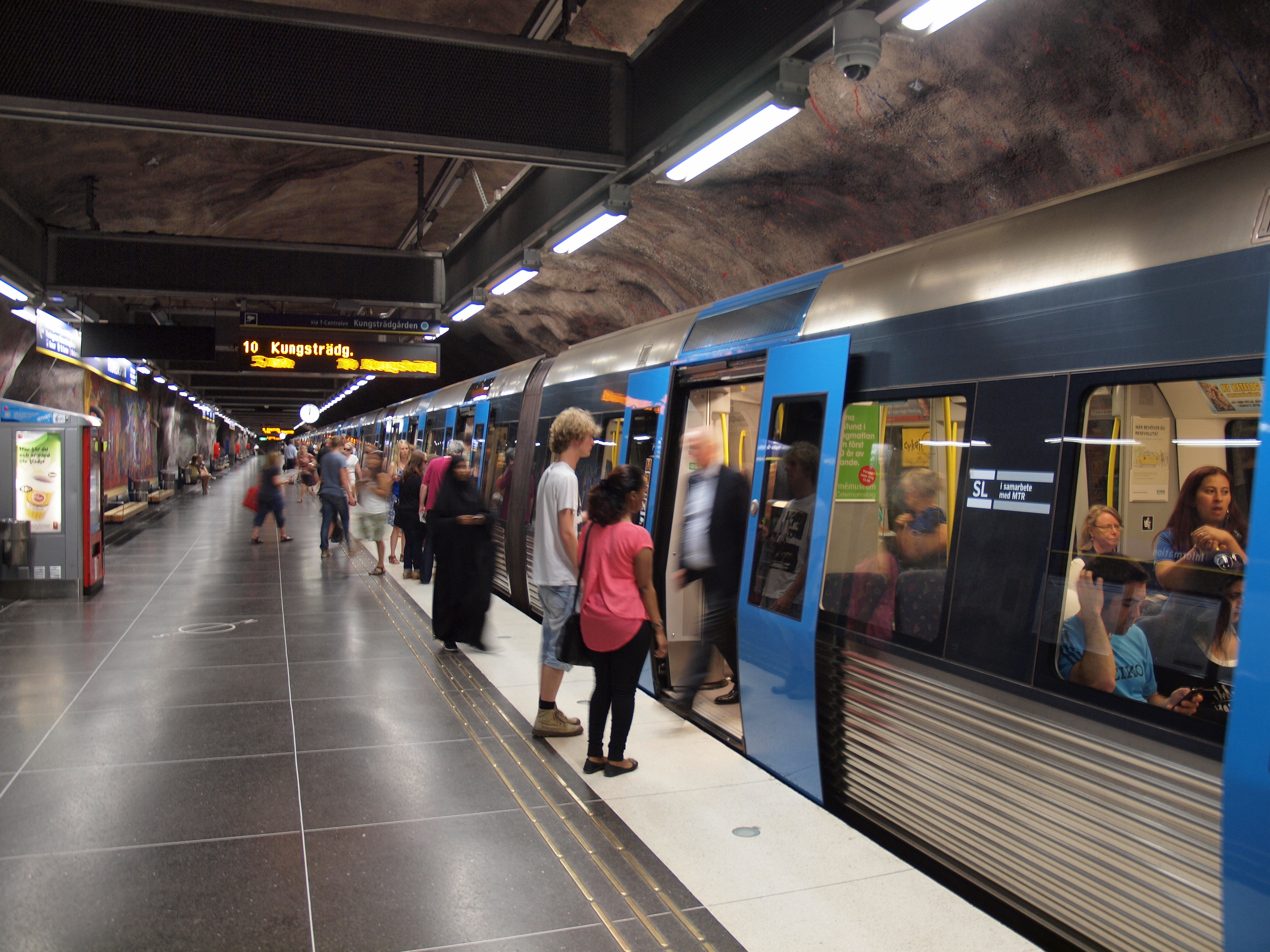

General information
- Location: Kungsholmen, Stockholm
- Coordinates: 59°19′57″N 18°01′50″E
- System: Stockholm Metro station
- Owner: Storstockholms Lokaltrafik
- Platforms: 2
- Tracks: 4

Construction
- Structure type: Underground
- Accessible: Yes

Other information
- Station code: FHP

History
- Opened: 26 October 1952; 73 years ago
- Rebuilt: 31 October 1975

Passengers
- 2019: 51,650 boarding per weekday (metro total)
- 2019: 20,250 (Blue Line)
- 2019: 31,400 (Green Line)

Services
Preceding station	Stockholm Metro	Following station
Rådhuset towards Kungsträdgården	Line 10	Stadshagen towards Hjulsta
Rådhuset towards Kungsträdgården	Line 11	Stadshagen towards Akalla
Thorildsplan towards Åkeshov	Line 17	St. Eriksplan towards Skarpnäck
Thorildsplan towards Alvik	Line 18	St. Eriksplan towards Farsta strand
Thorildsplan towards Hässelby strand	Line 19	St. Eriksplan towards Hagsätra

Future Services
Preceding station	Stockholm Metro	Following station
Terminus	Yellow Line	Liljeholmen towards Älvsjö
Location
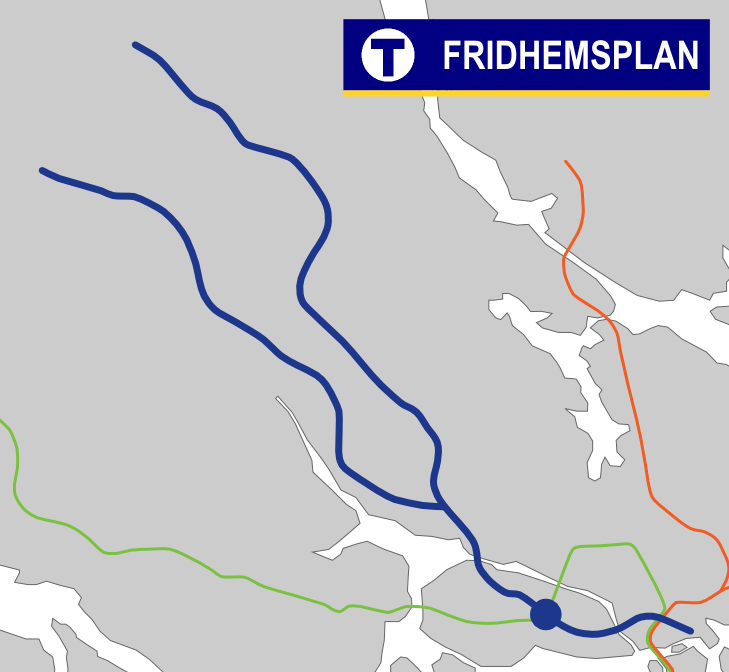
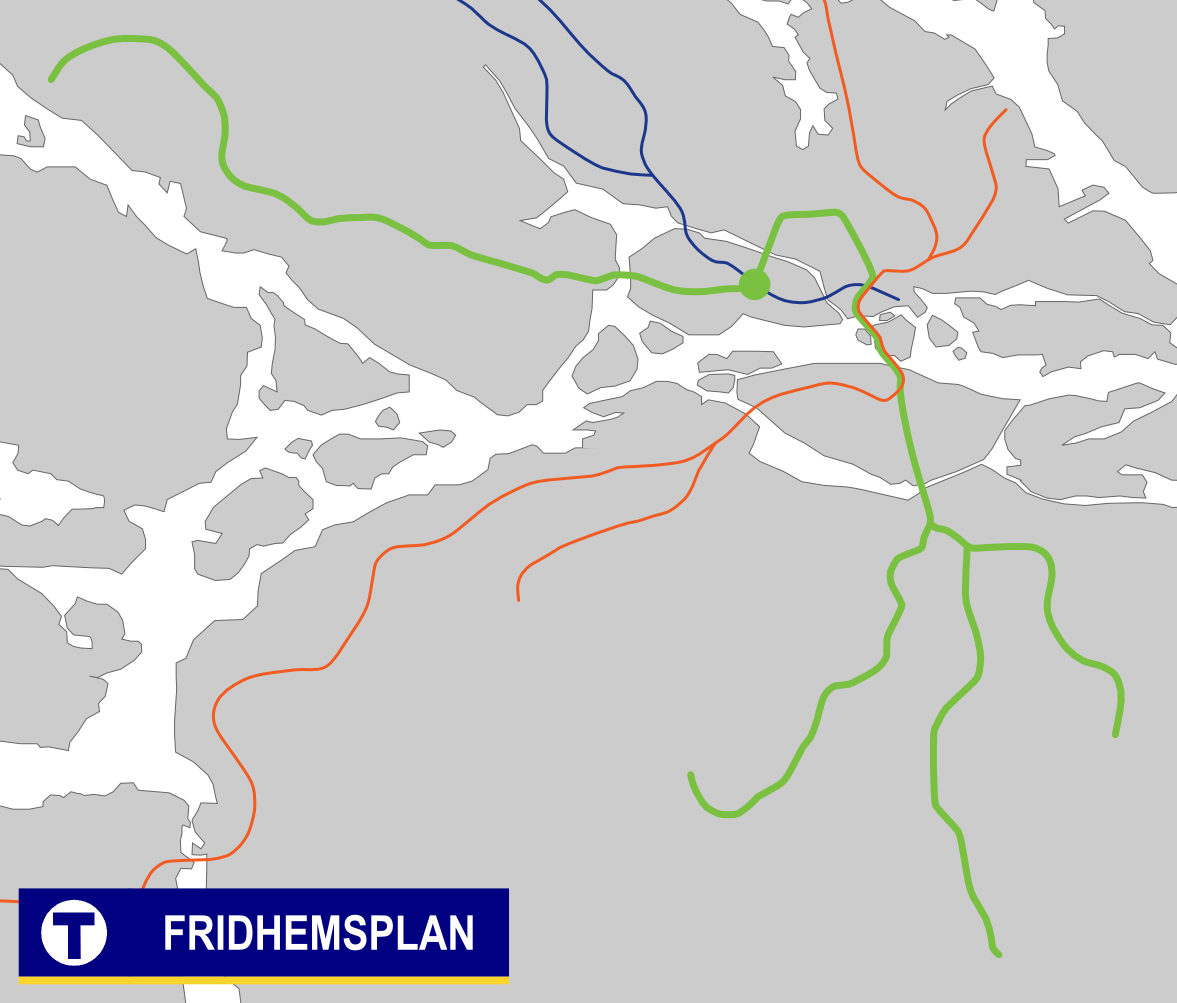

Fridhemsplan metro station is a station of the Stockholm Metro, located in the district of Kungsholmen. The station is entirely underground and provides an interchange between the Blue and Green lines. There are two platforms for each line, about a hundred metres apart.

To the south-west of the station a tunnel between the blue and green lines provides the only connection for trains to be moved onto and off the Blue Line.

The Green Line platforms were opened on 26 October 1952 as a part of the stretch between Hötorget and Vällingby. and are around 18 m (59 ft) under the ground. The distance to Slussen is 4.9 km (3.0 mi). The second part was opened on 31 August 1975 as part the first stretch of the Blue Line between T-Centralen and Hjulsta. The trains were running via Hallonbergen and Rinkeby. The blue line platform is around 28–31 meters under the ground. The distance to Kungsträdgården is 2.1 km (1.3 mi).

Fridhemsplan will be the northern terminus of the new Yellow Line, due to open by 2035. The new line will feature new platforms below the existing platforms, 55 meters below ground, however it will share the current station entrances at Drottningholmsvägen, Mariebergsgatan, Fleminggatan, and S:t Eriksgatan.

== Gallery ==
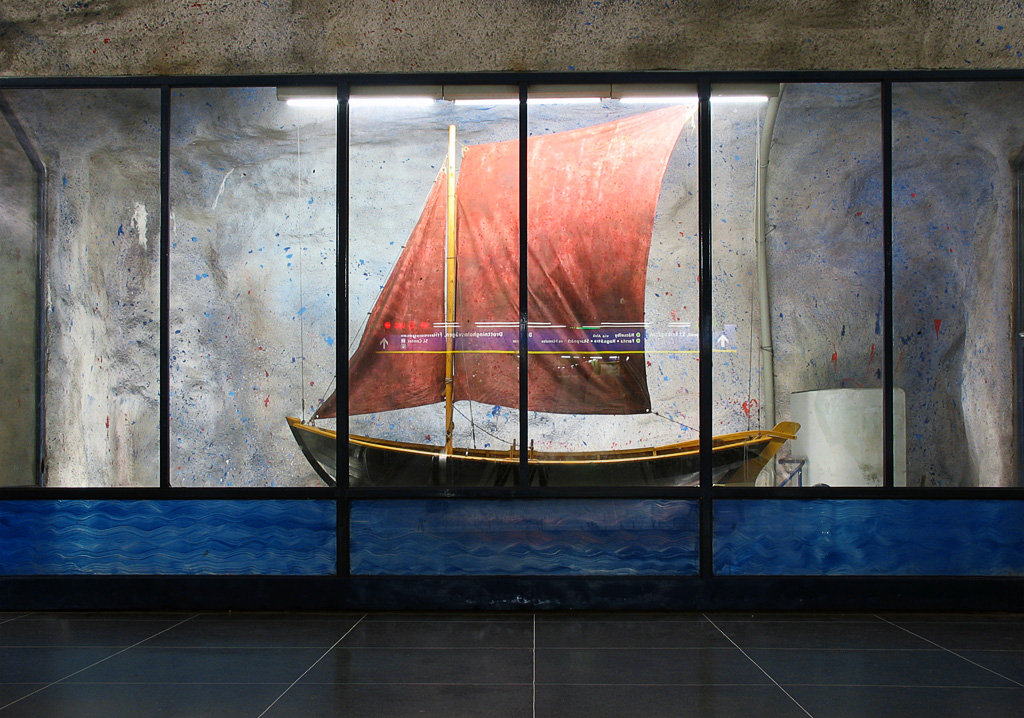

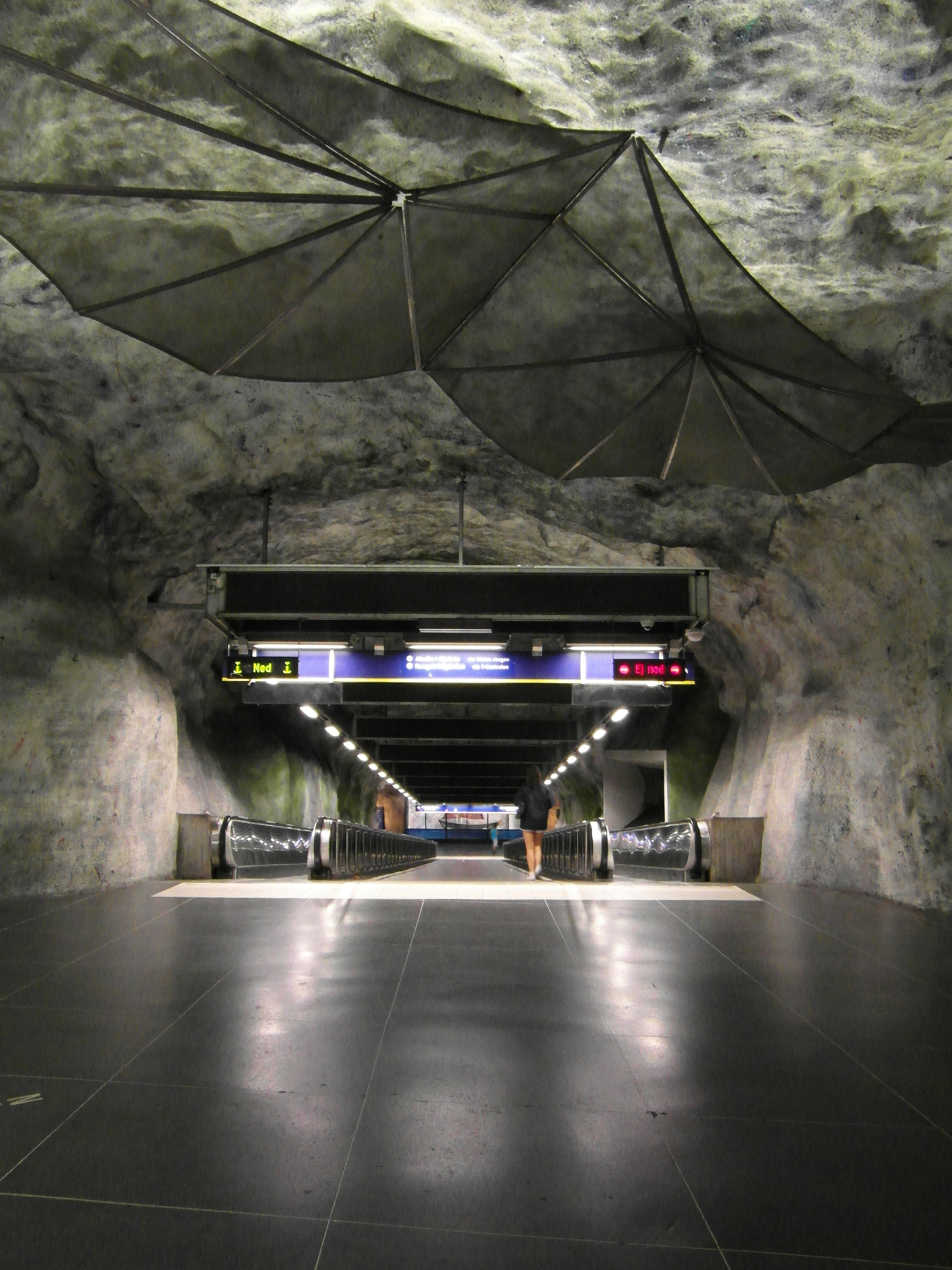

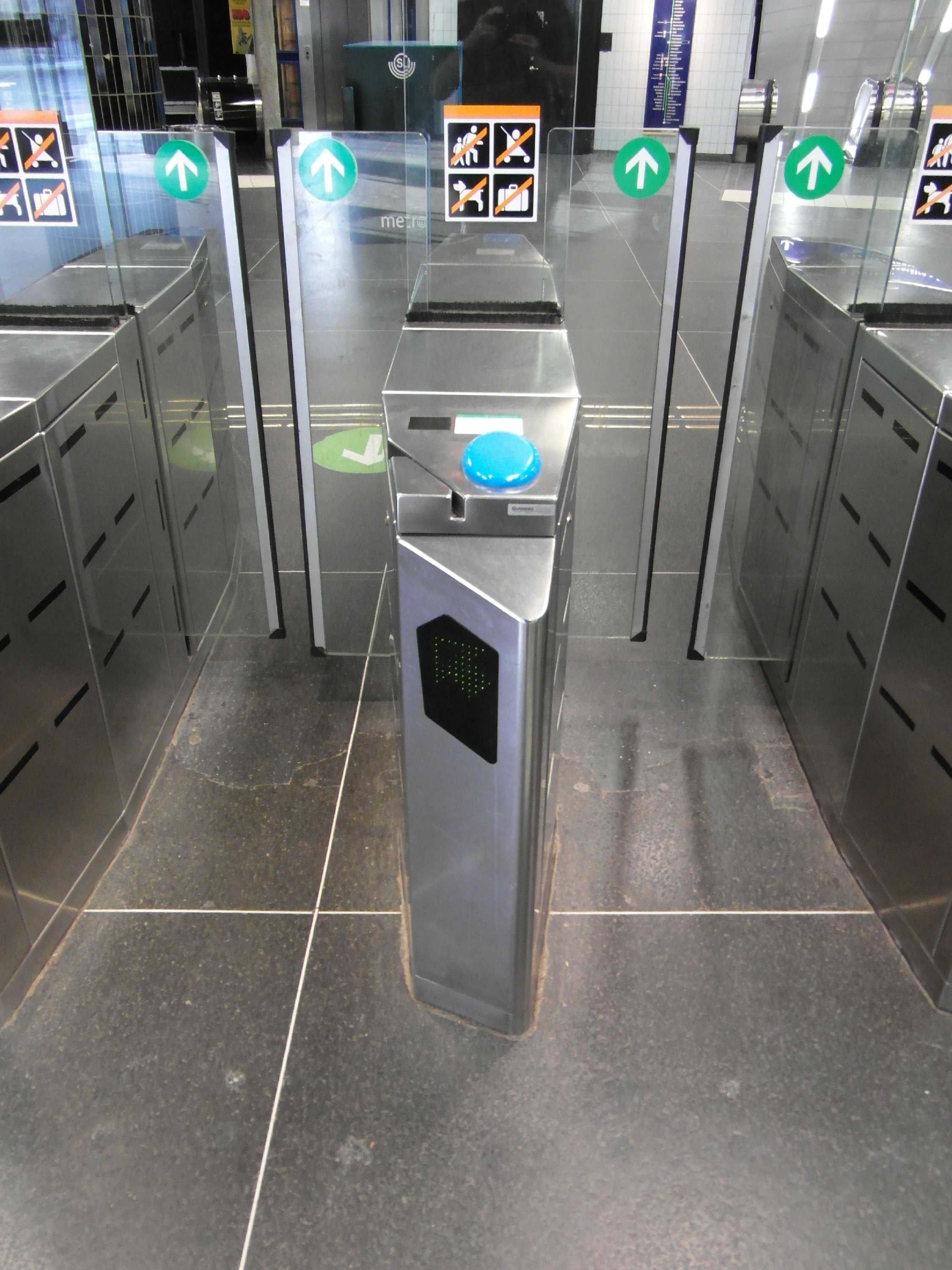

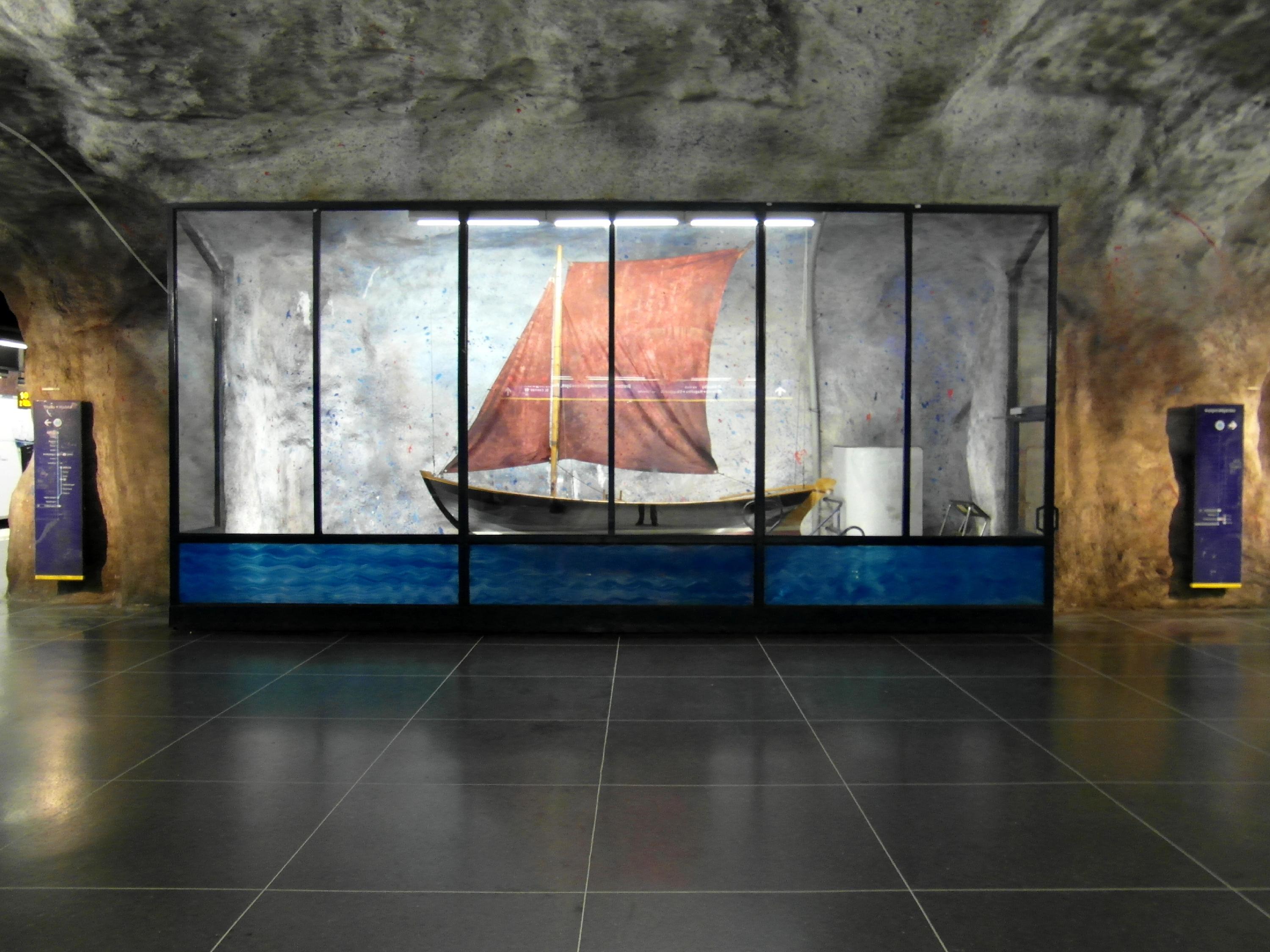

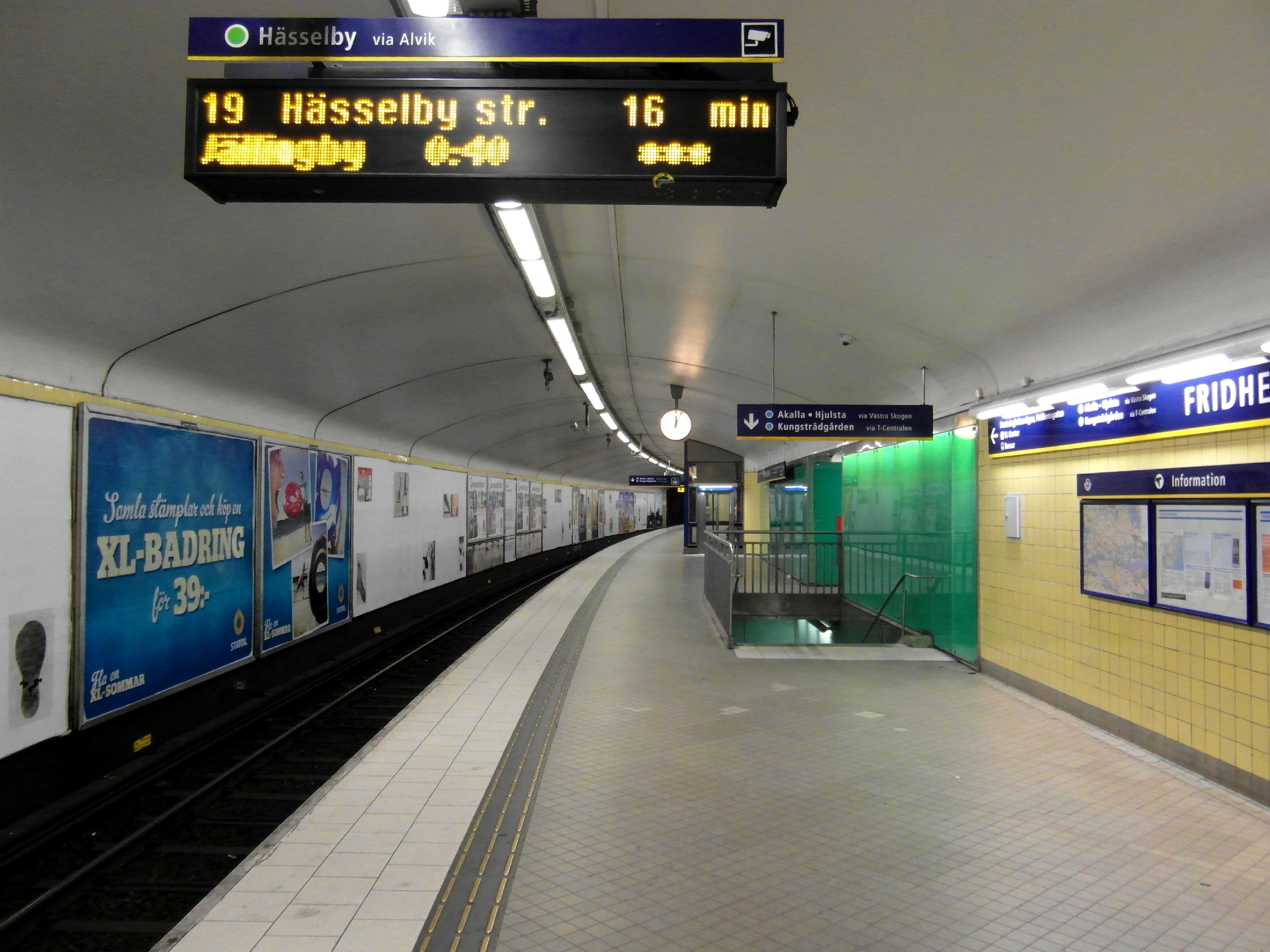

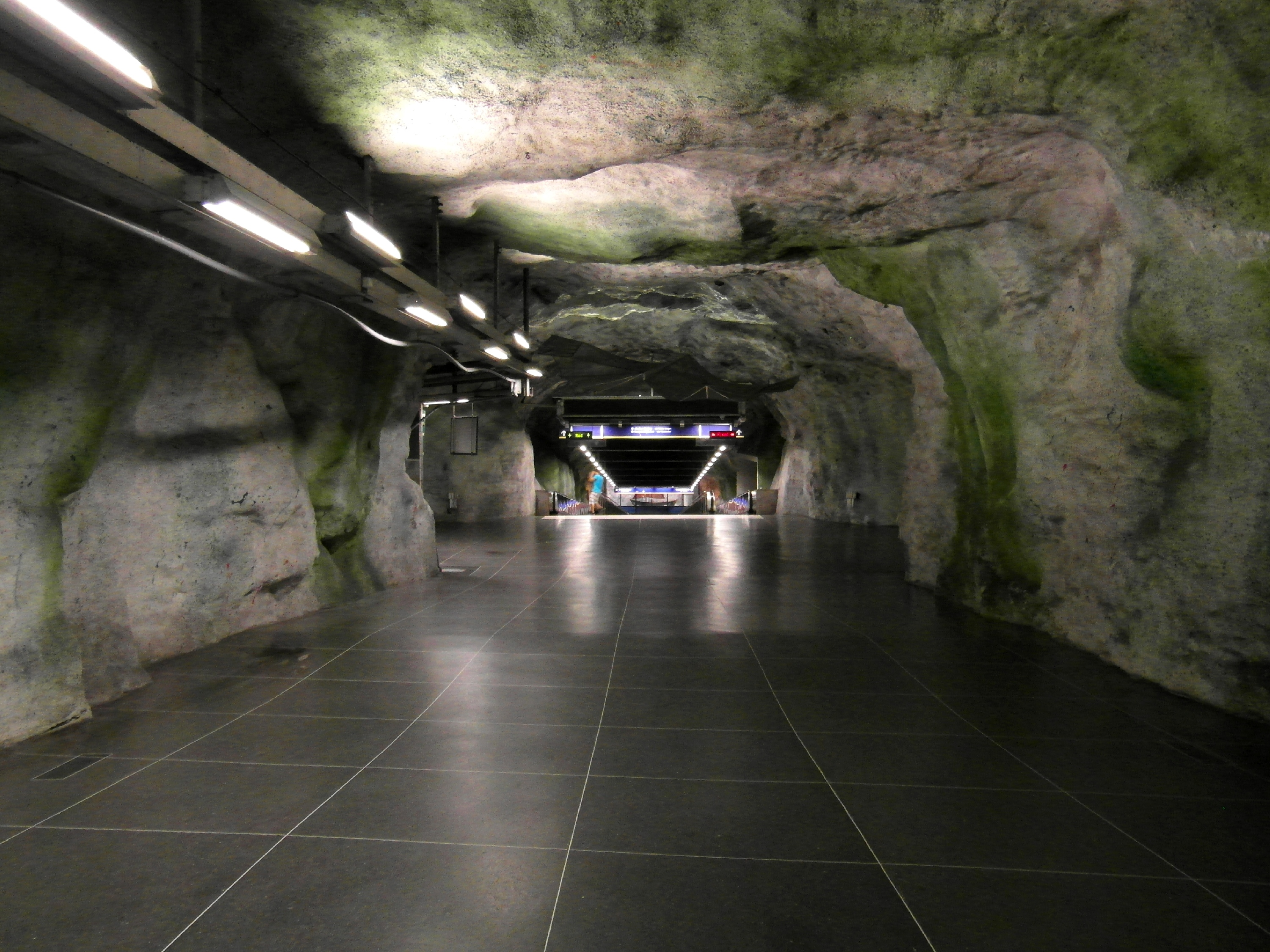

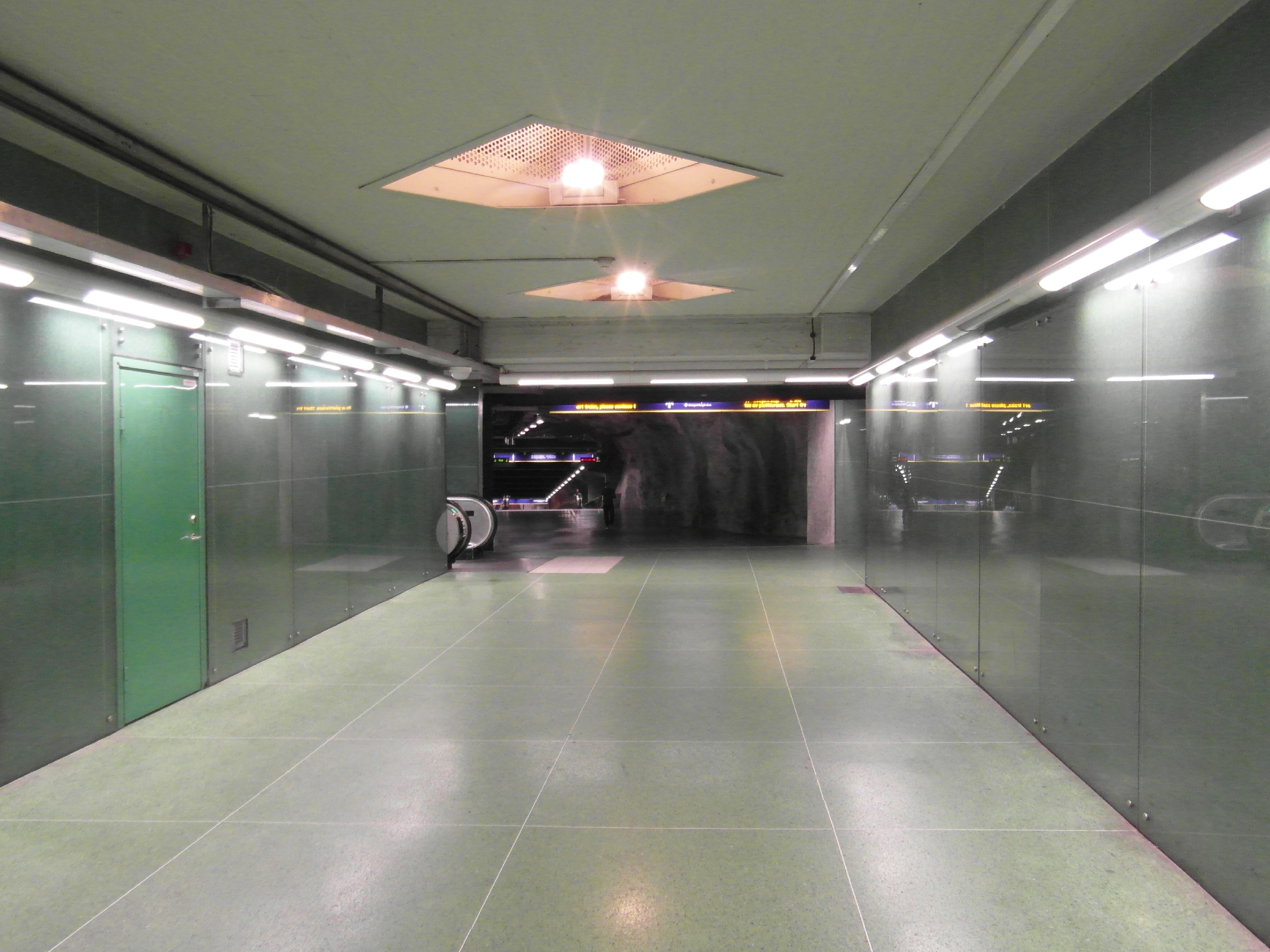

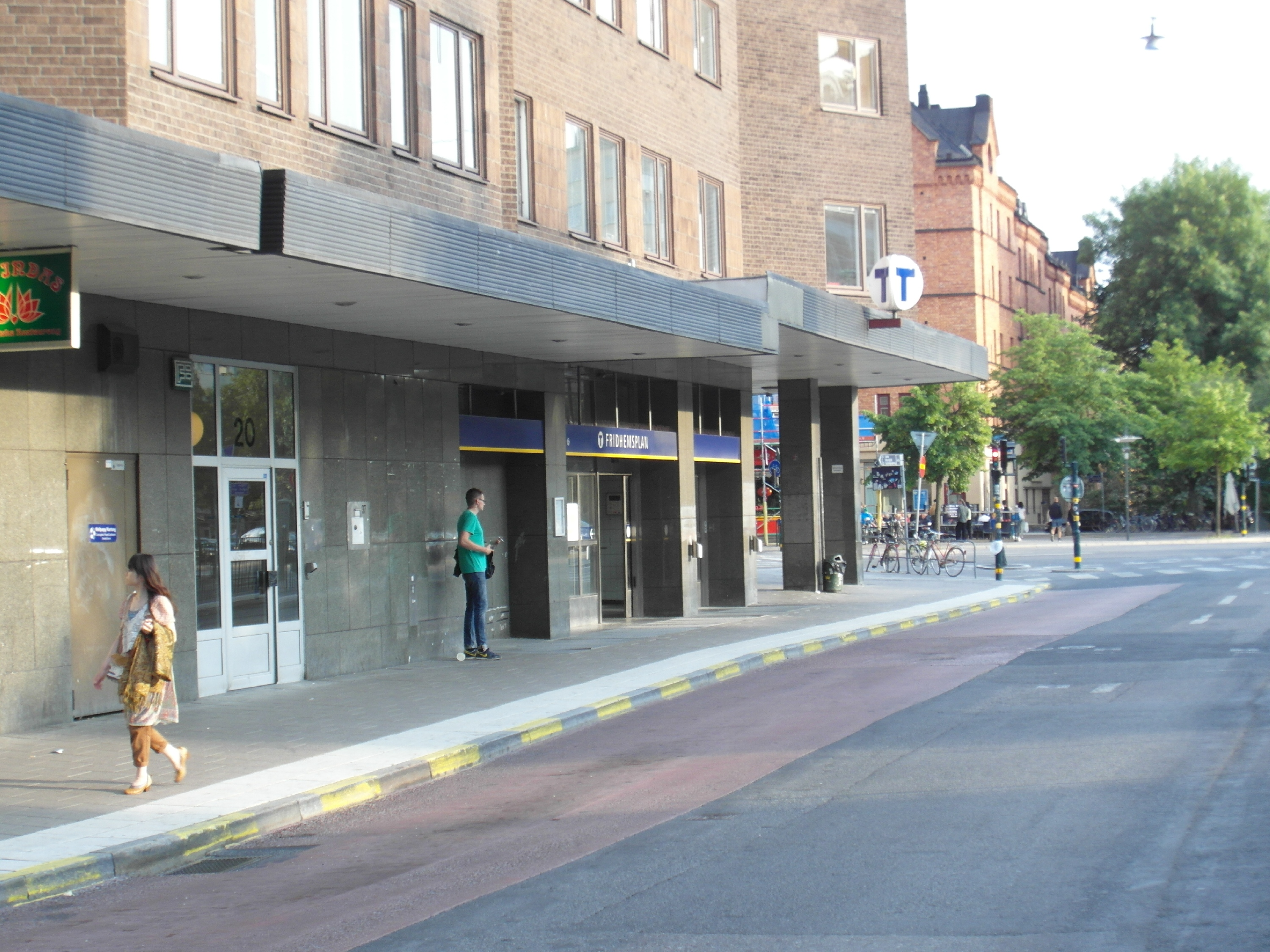

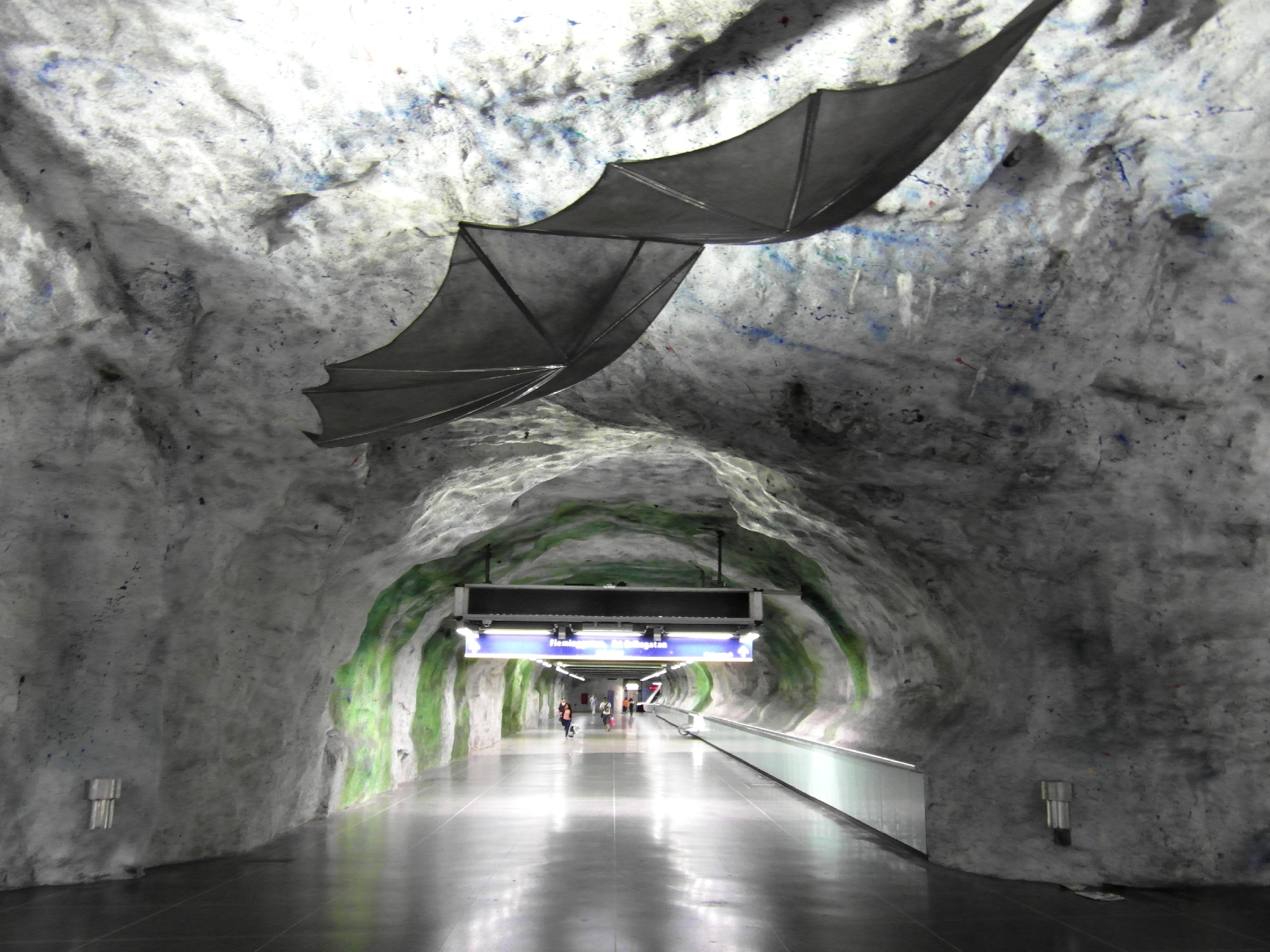

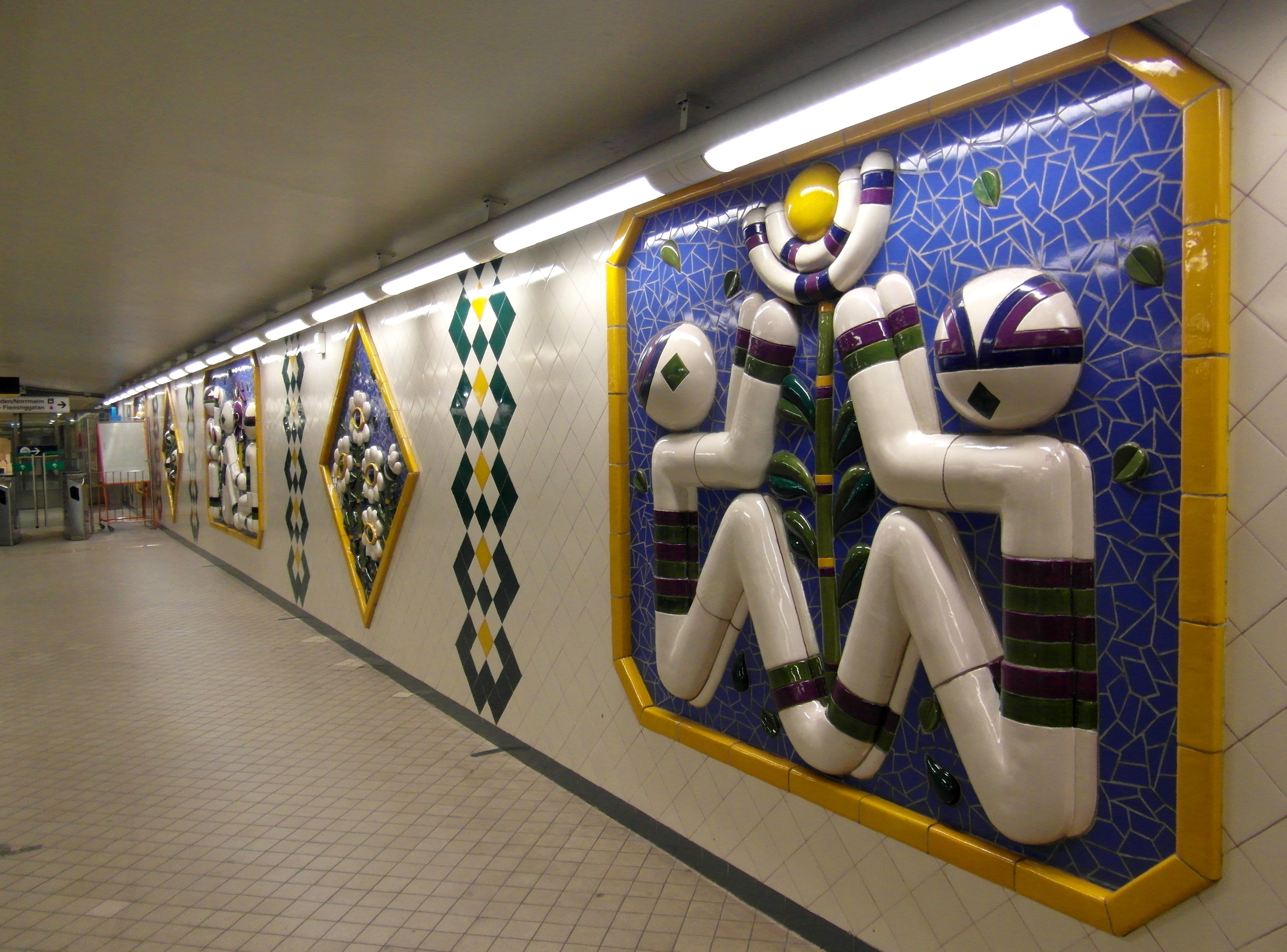

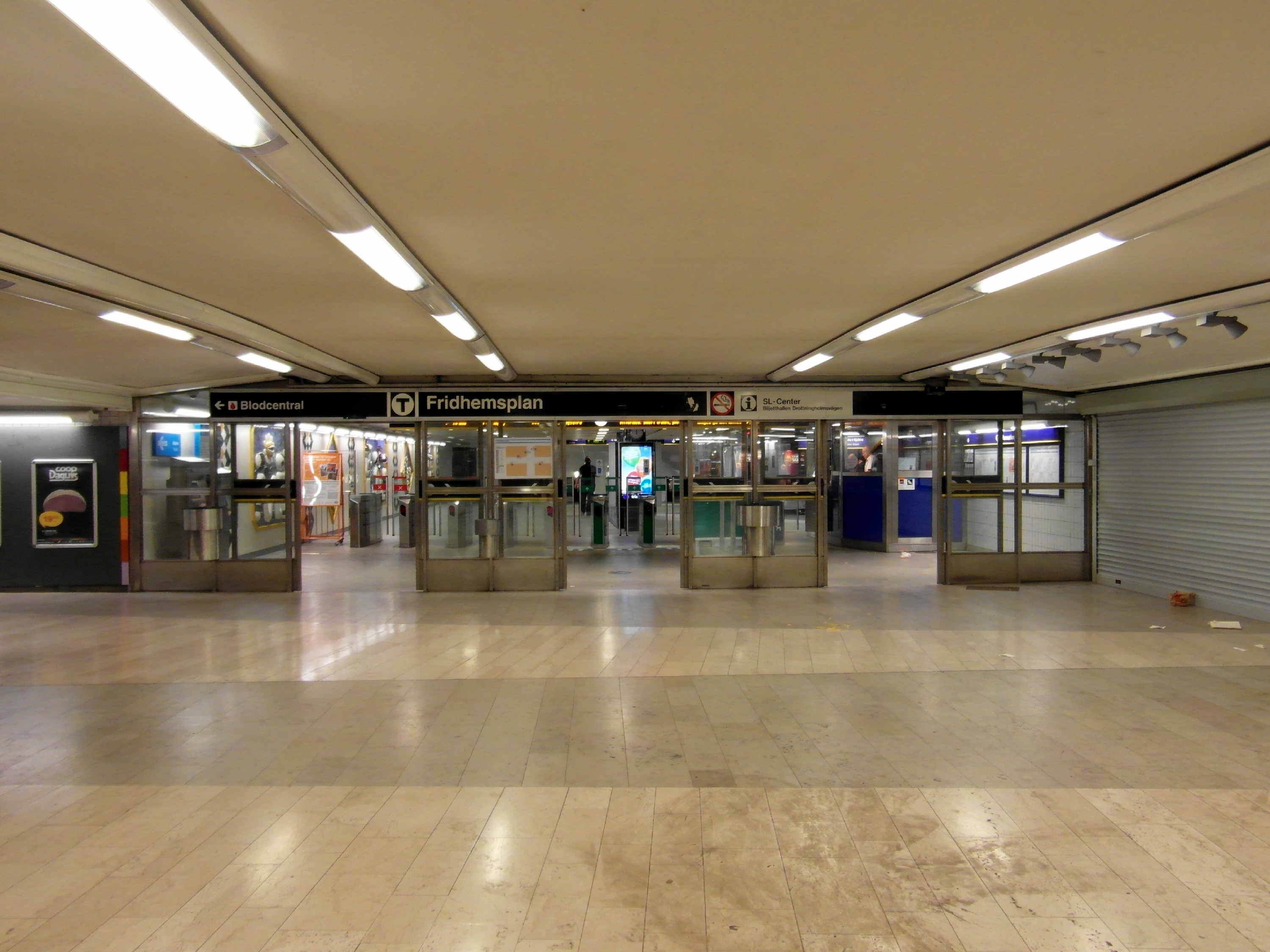

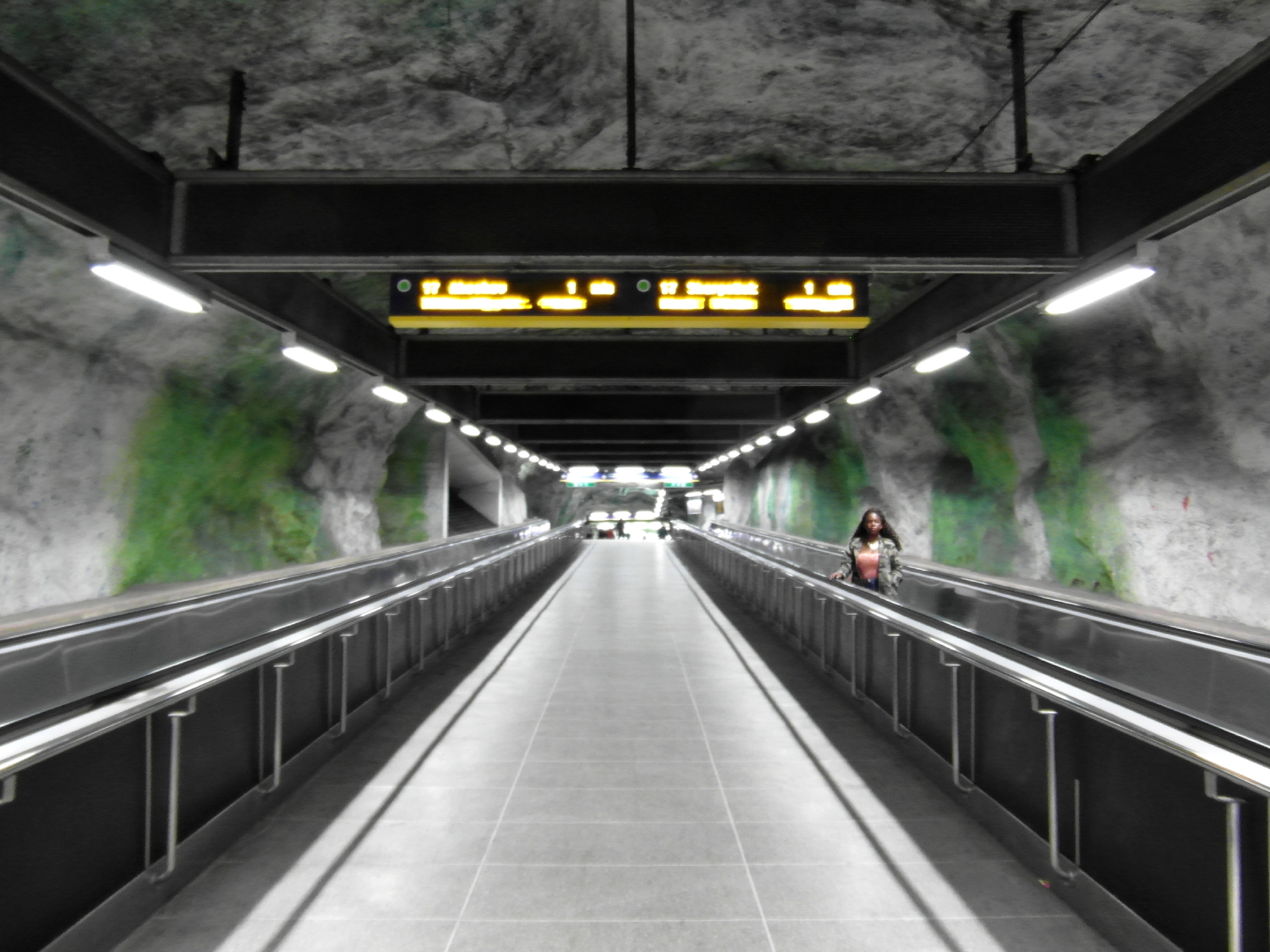

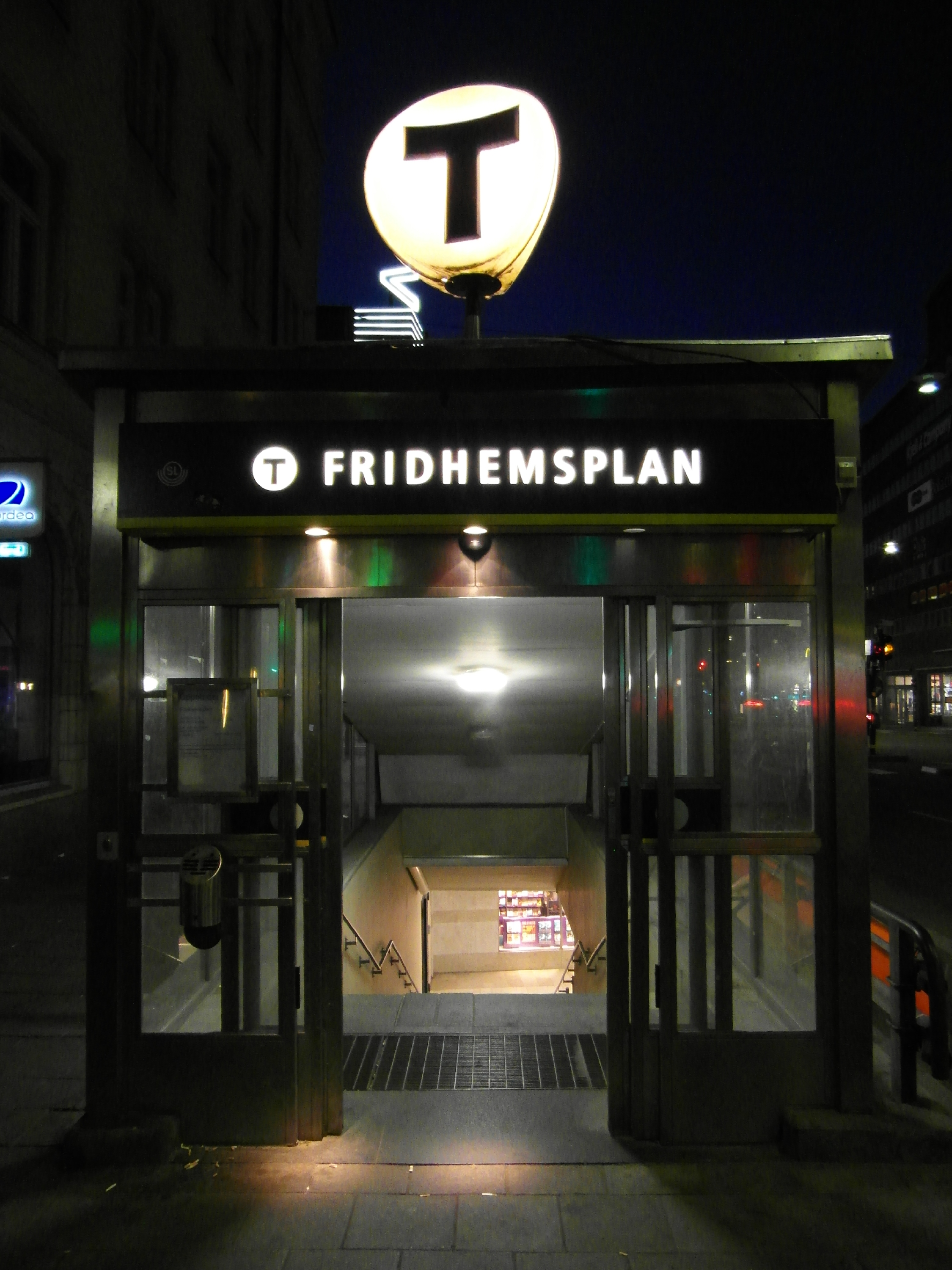

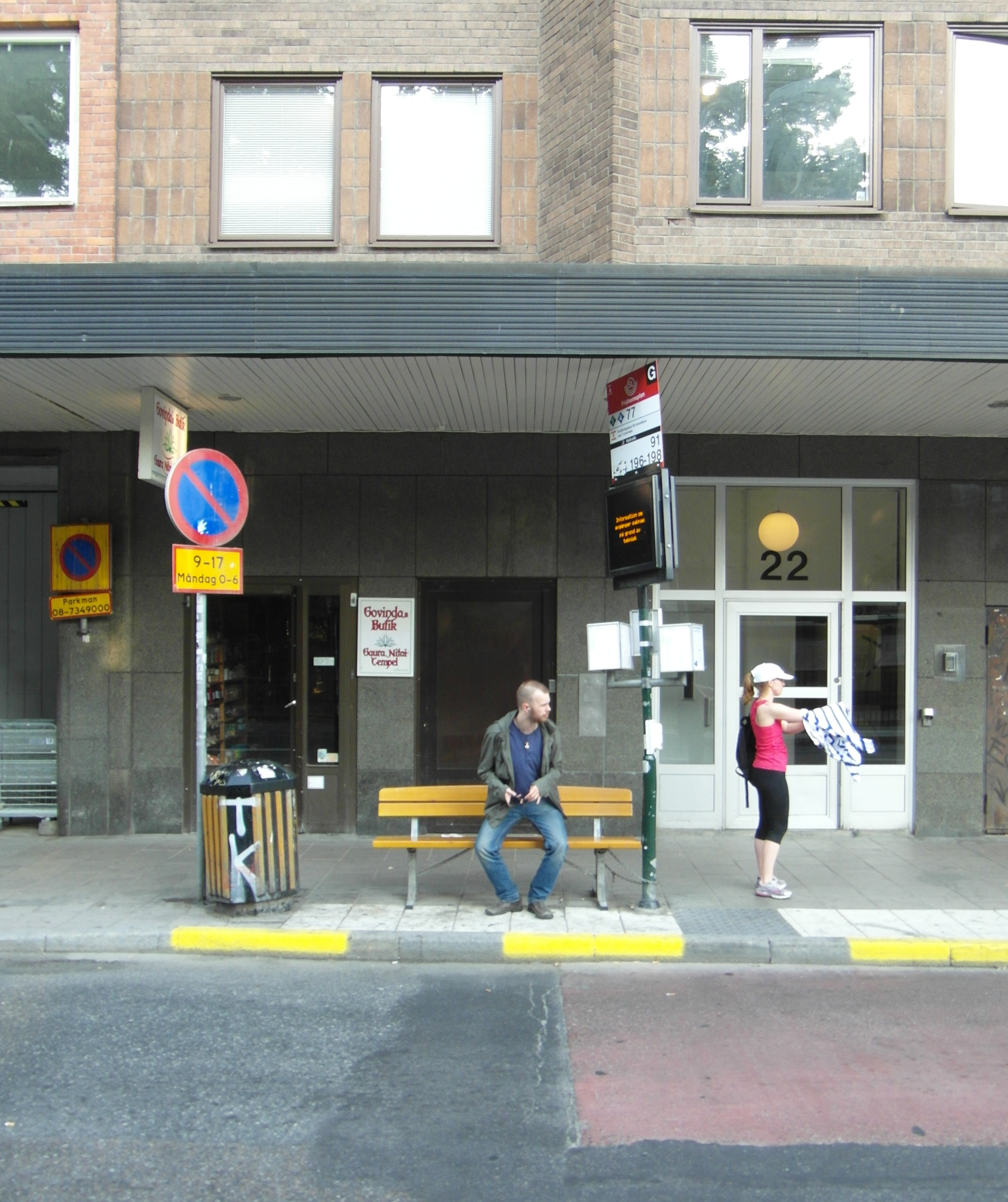

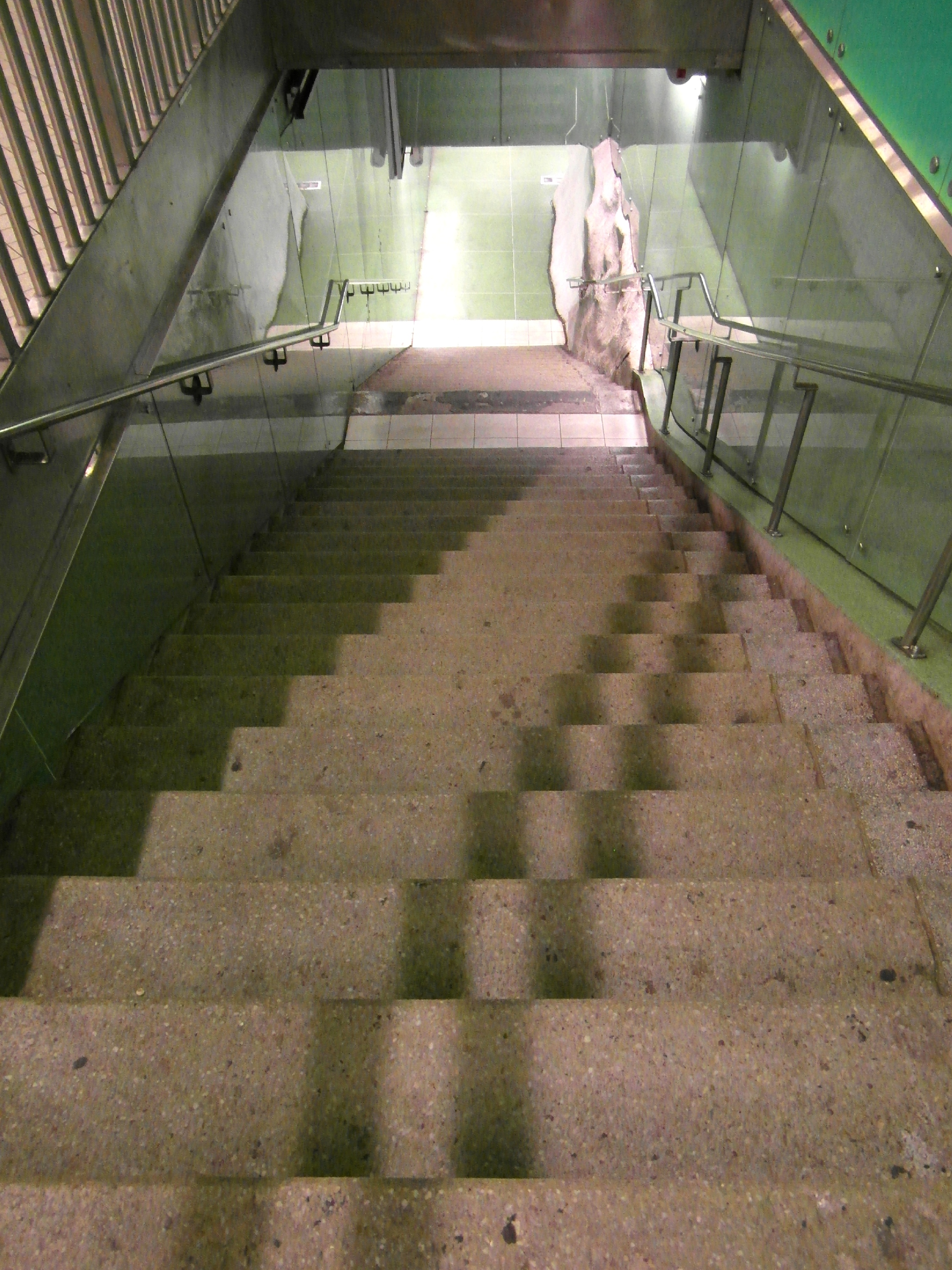

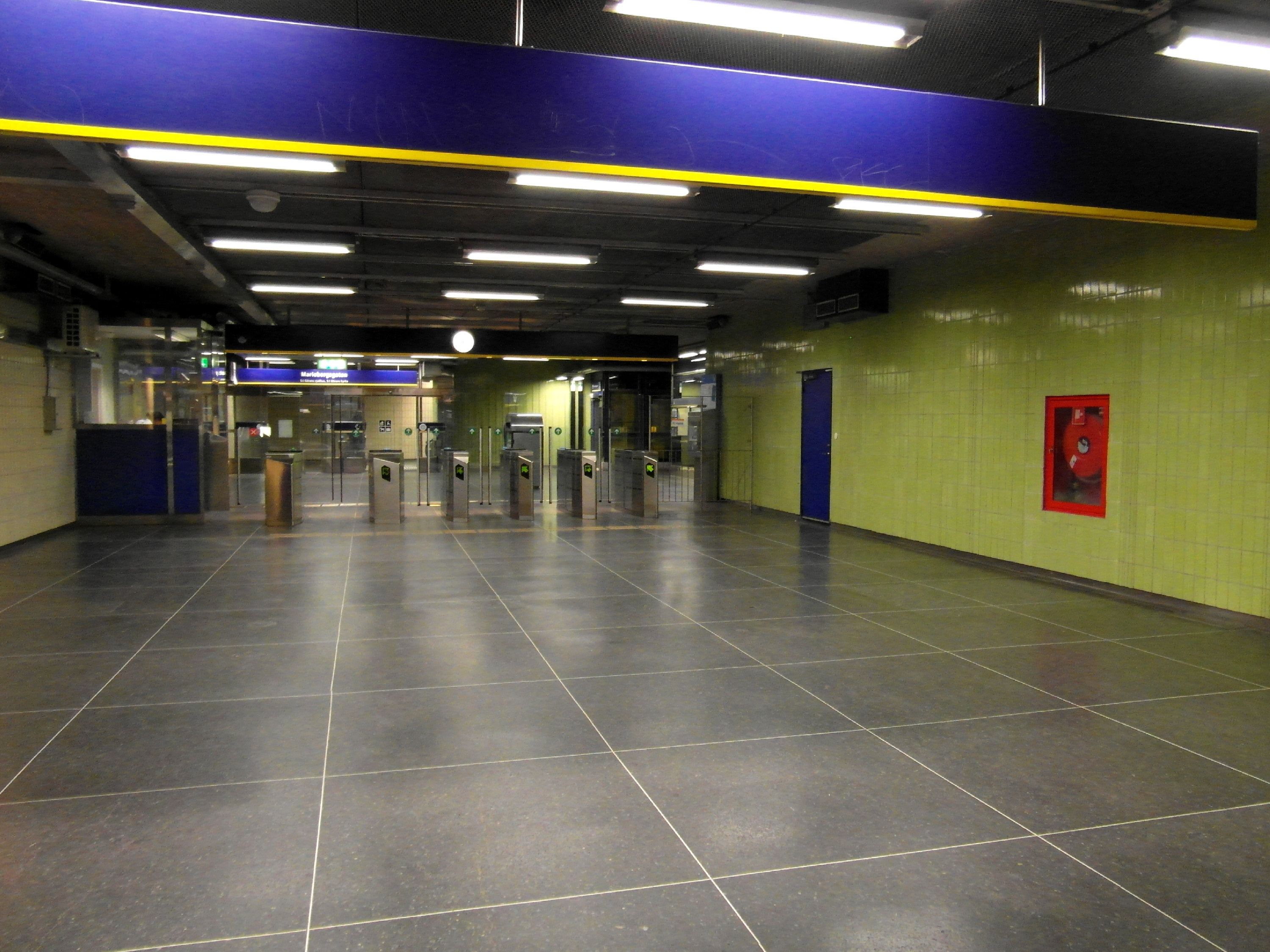

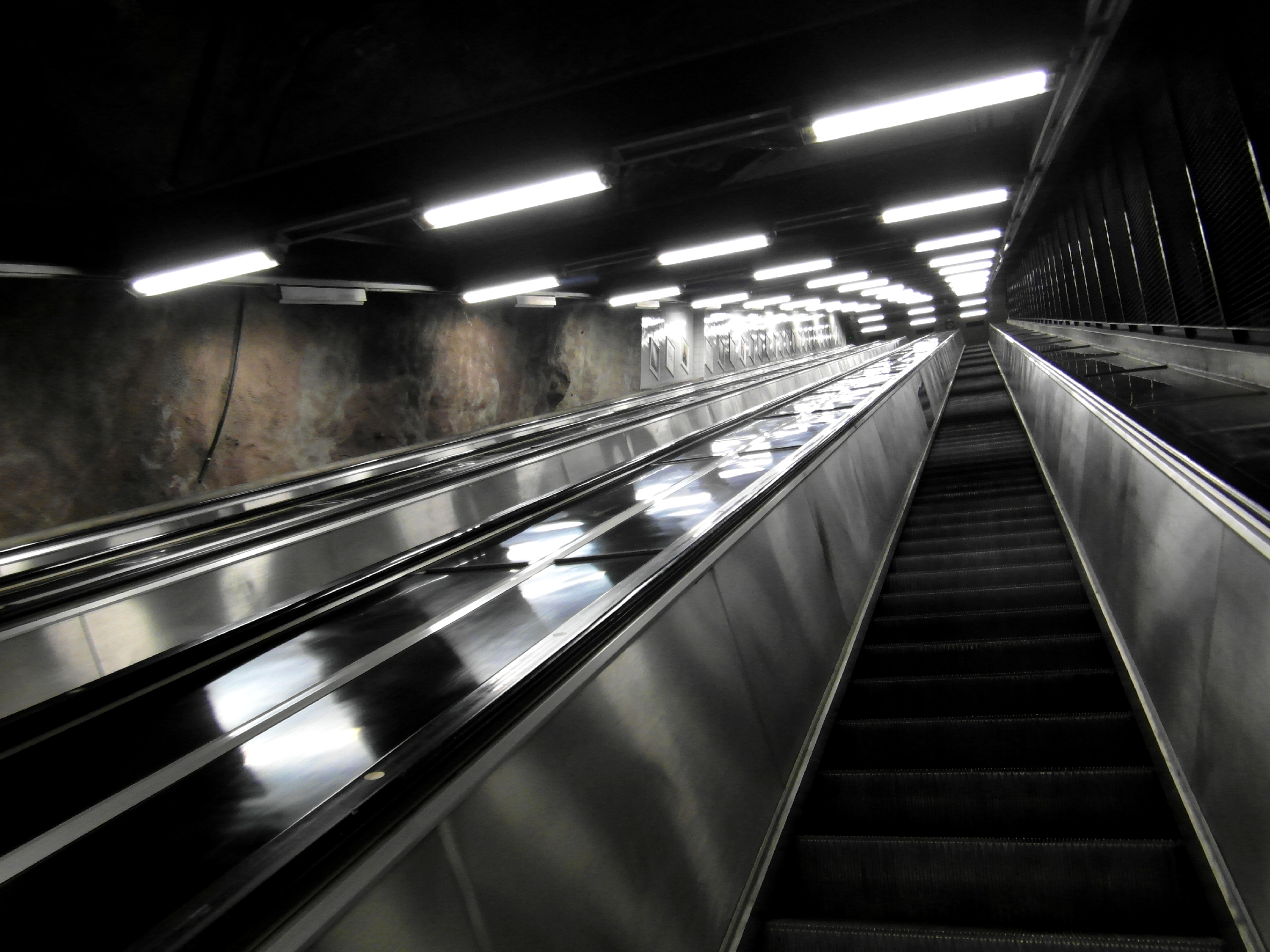

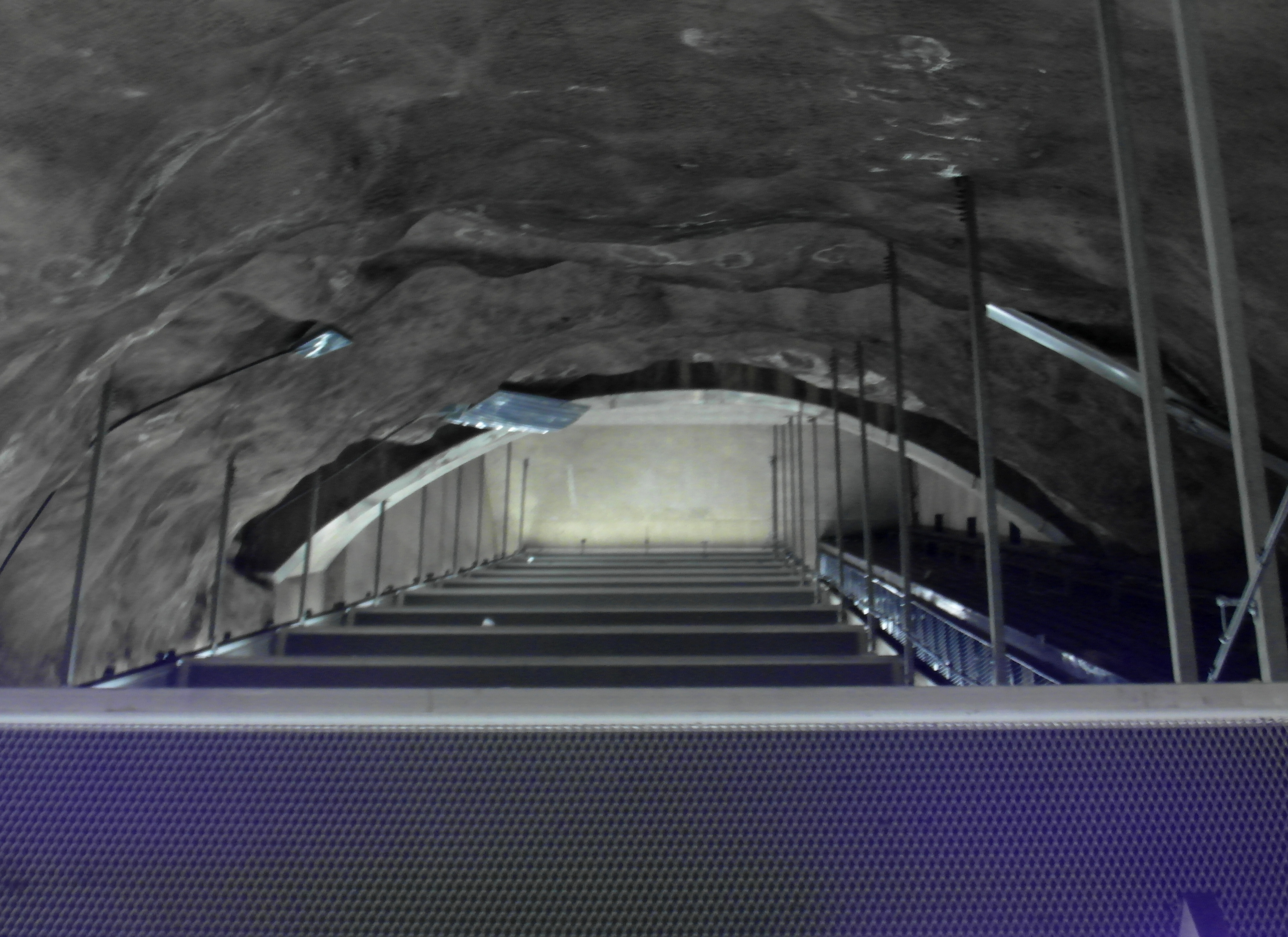

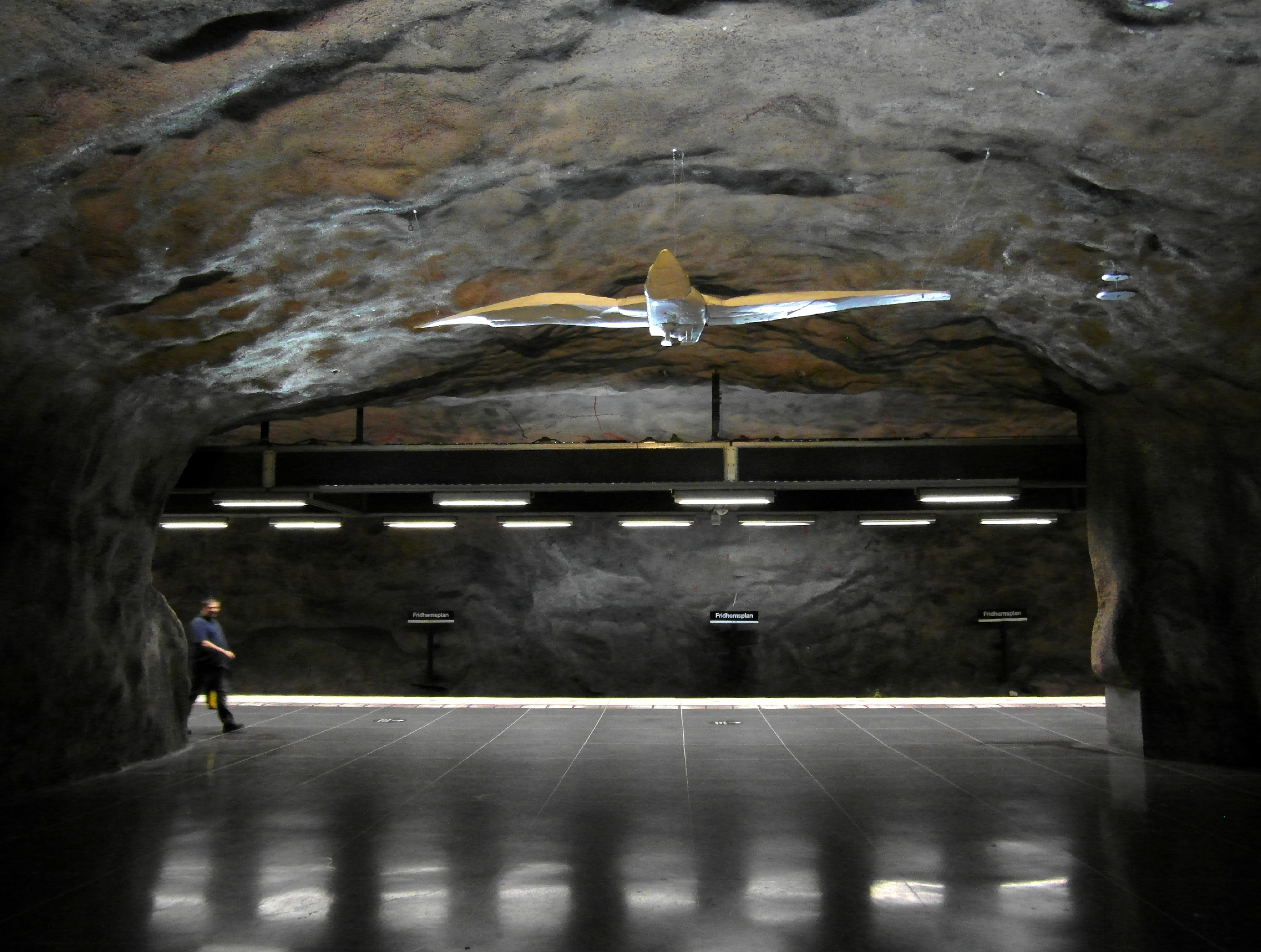

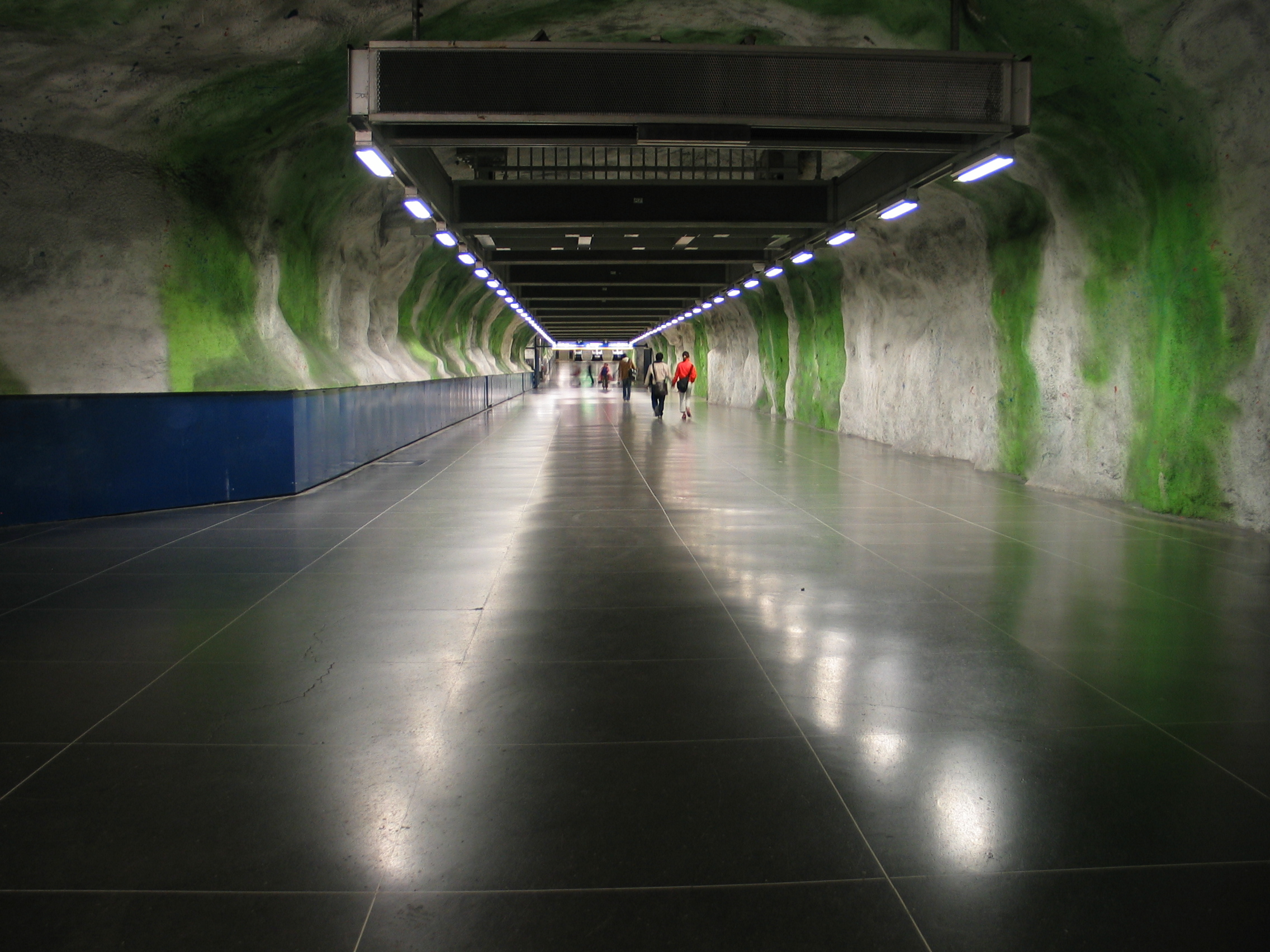

== See also ==
- Fridhemsplan
