= Sankt Eriksplan metro station =

Stockholm Metro station

S:t Eriksplan
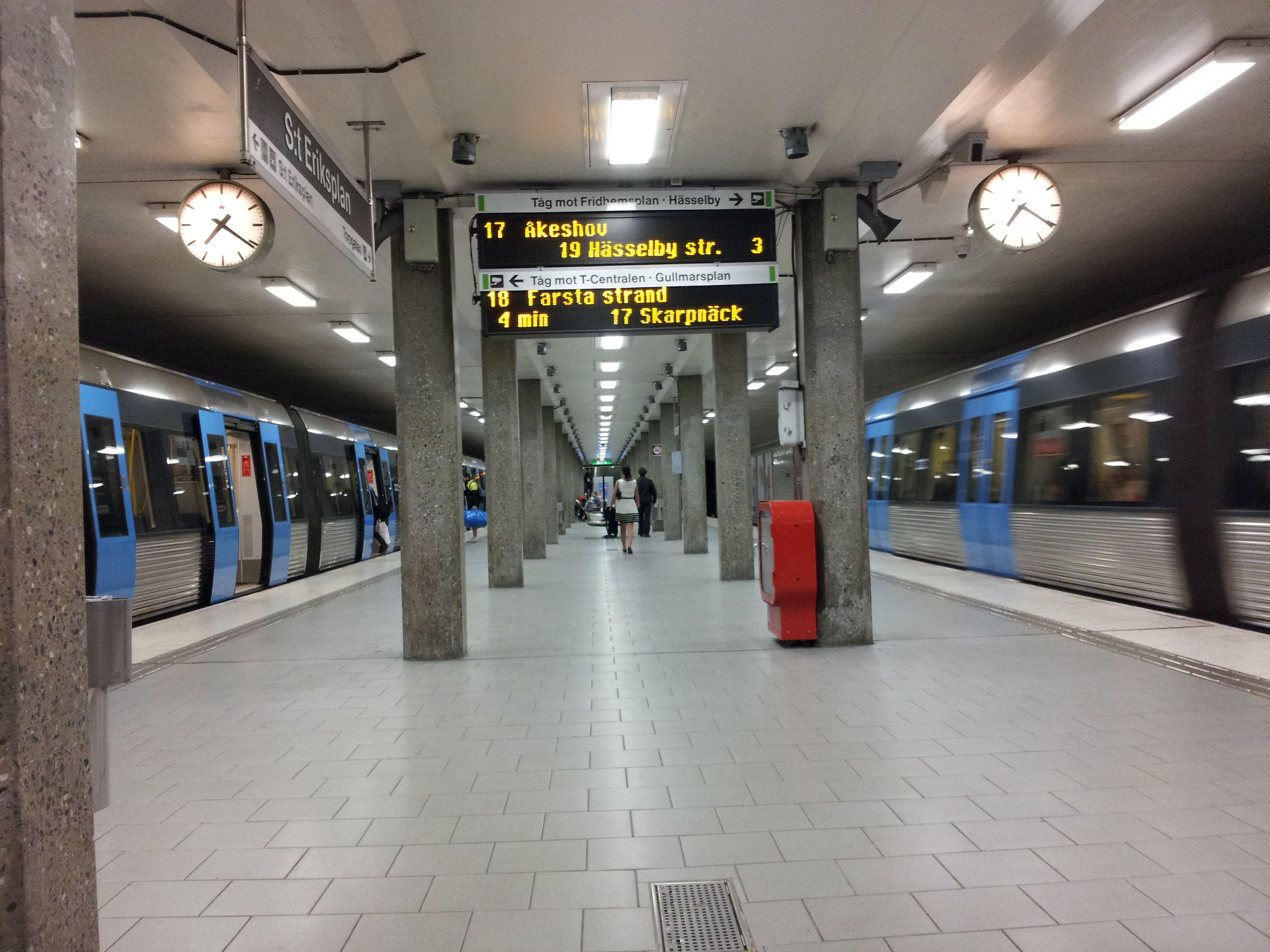
- Train in platform, 2011

General information
- Coordinates: 59°20′23″N 18°02′13″E
- System: Stockholm Metro station
- Owner: Storstockholms Lokaltrafik
- Distance: 4.1 km (2.5 mi) from Slussen
- Platforms: 1 island platform
- Tracks: 2

Construction
- Structure type: Underground
- Depth: ~8 m (26 ft)
- Accessible: Yes

Other information
- Station code: SEP

History
- Opened: 26 October 1952; 73 years ago

Passengers
- 2019: 21,150 boarding per weekday

Services
Preceding station	Stockholm Metro	Following station
Fridhemsplan towards Åkeshov	Line 17	Odenplan towards Skarpnäck
Fridhemsplan towards Alvik	Line 18	Odenplan towards Farsta strand
Fridhemsplan towards Hässelby strand	Line 19	Odenplan towards Hagsätra
Location
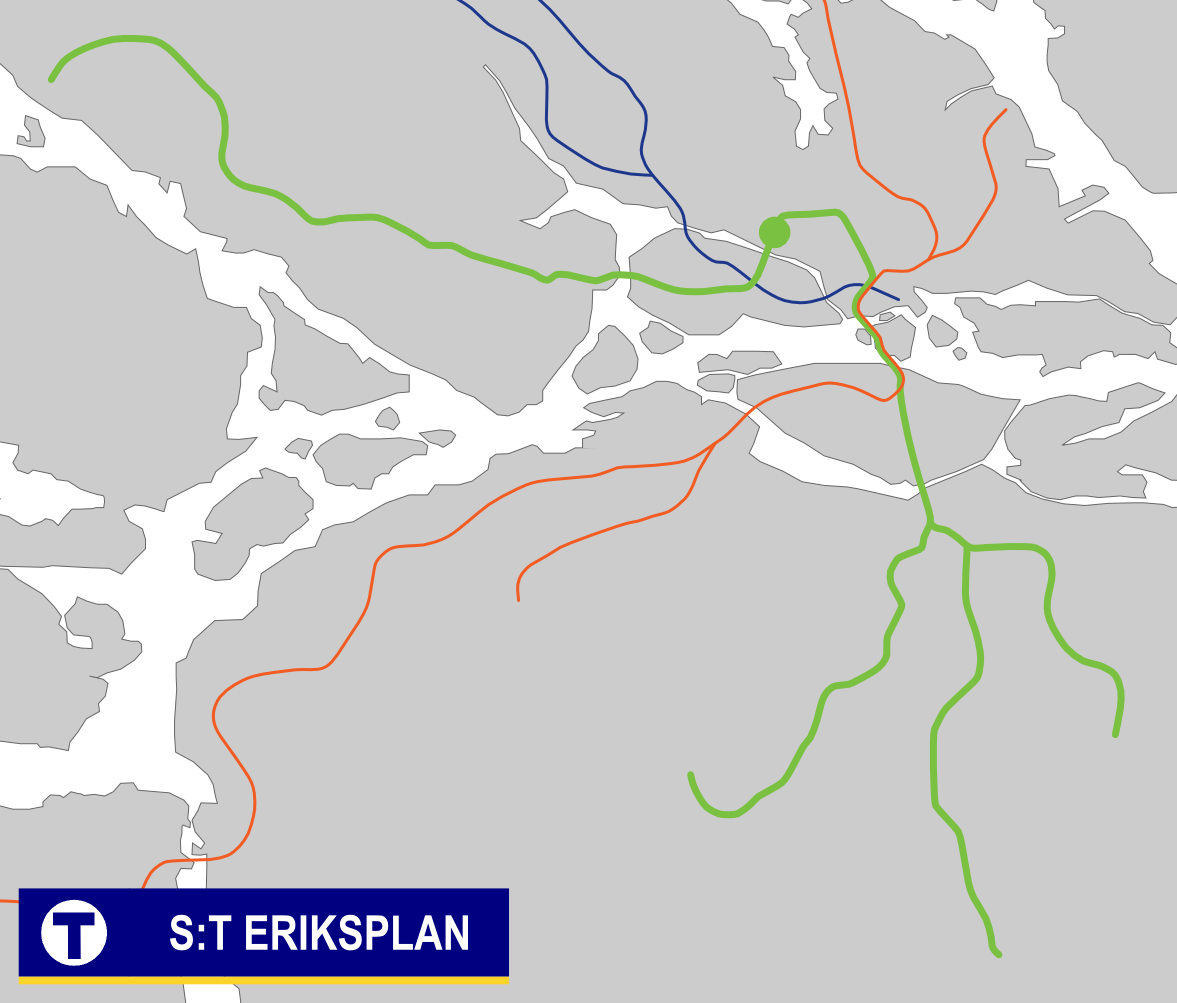

Sankt Eriksplan (often abbreviated as S:t Eriksplan) is a station on the Green Line of the Stockholm Metro. It is entirely underground, and is located in the district of Vasastaden, which is in the borough of Norrmalm in central Stockholm. The station has a single island platform, some 8 metres (26 ft) below street level, and is accessed via a pair of ticket halls. One ticket hall is under Sankt Eriksplan itself, and the other under the intersection of Torsgatan and Sankt Eriksgatan. Both ticket halls are linked to the surface by entrance pavilions containing stairs and lifts. The distance to Slussen is 4.1 km (2.5 mi).

The station was inaugurated on 26 October 1952 as a part of the section of line between Hötorget and Vällingby.

== Gallery ==
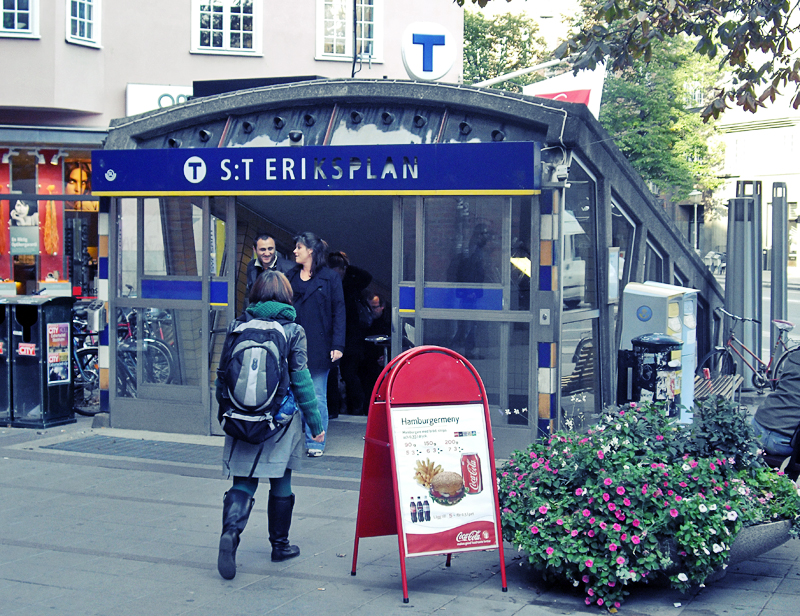
One of the entrances, 2009

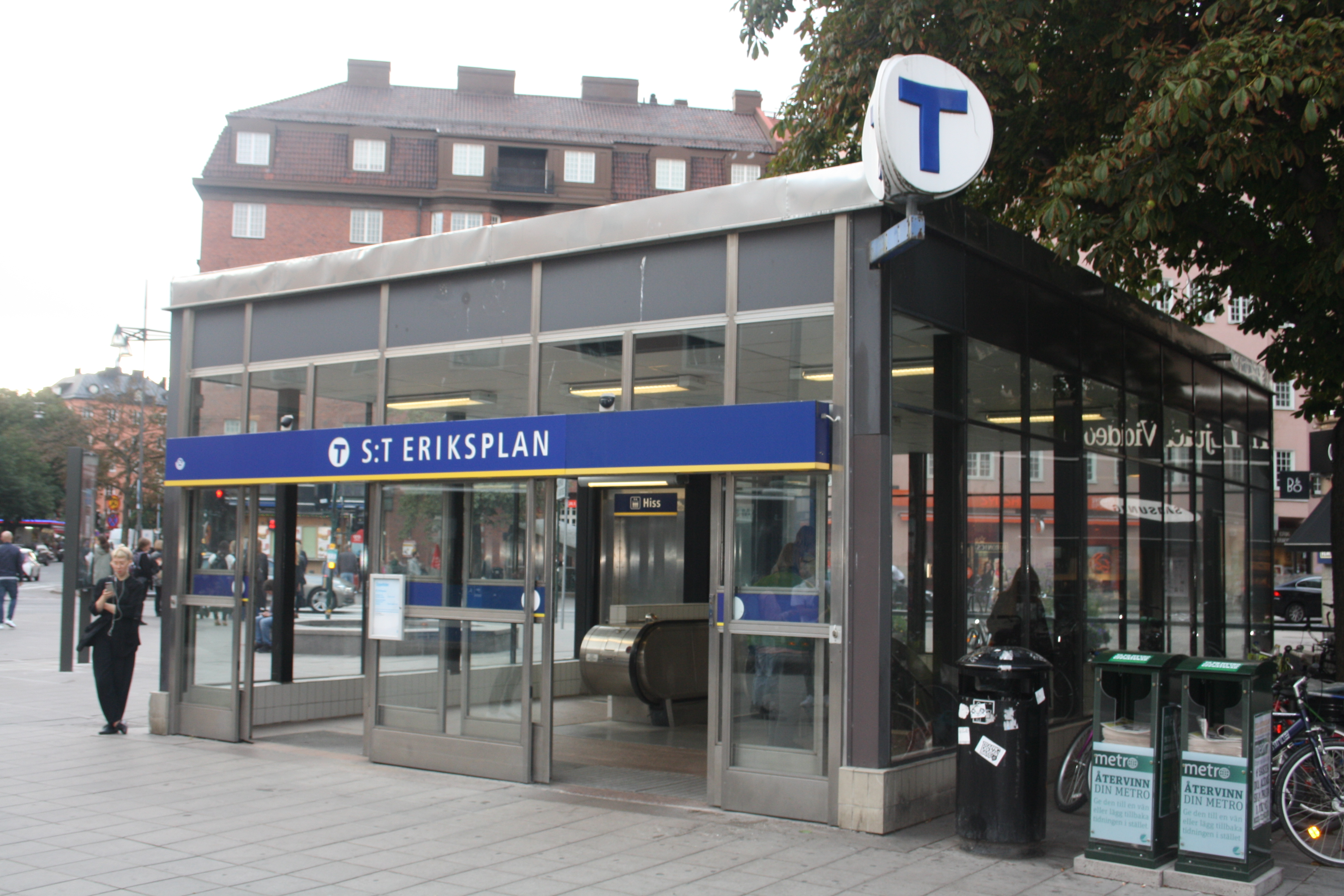
Another entrance, 2016

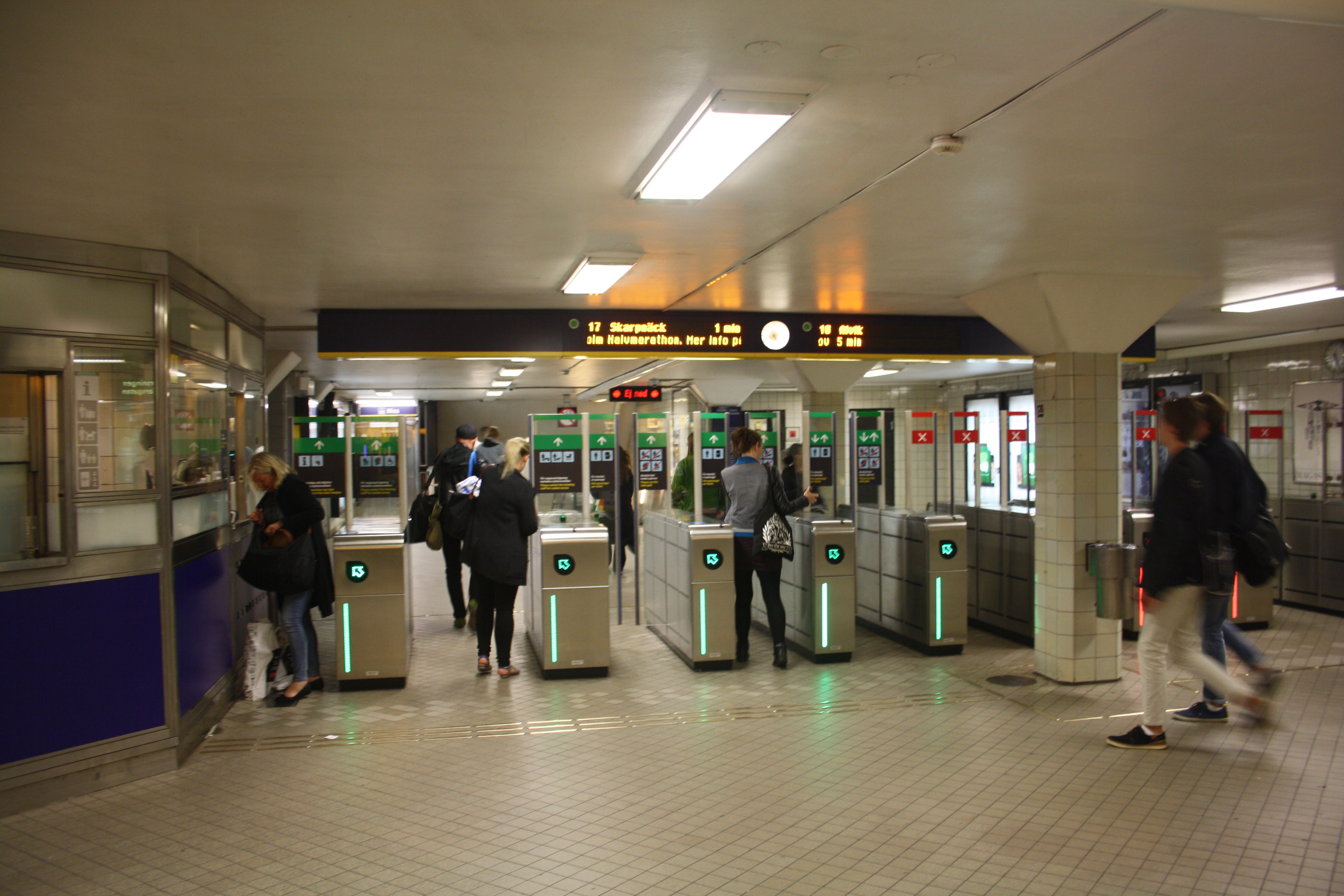
Ticket barriers, 2016

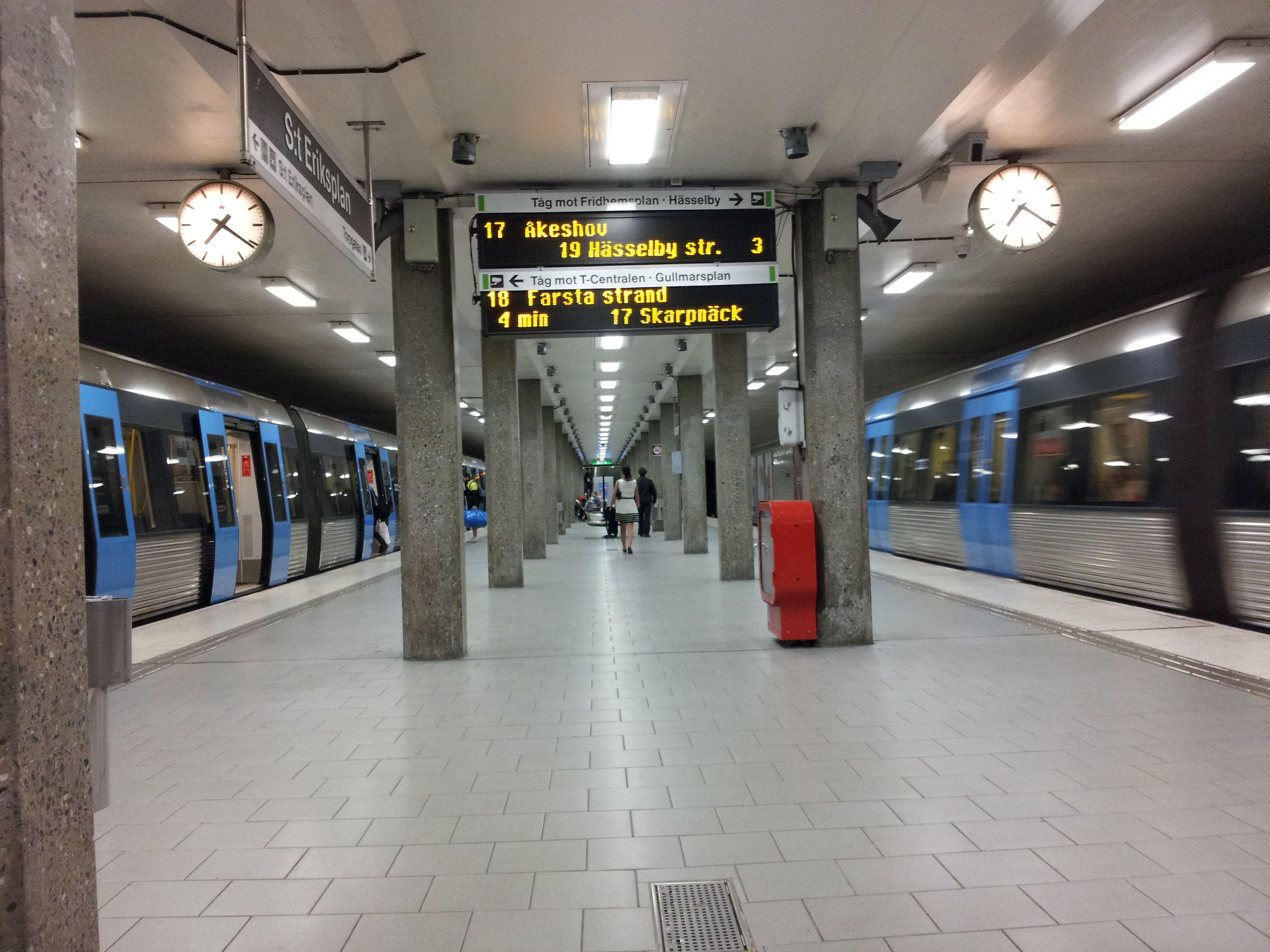
On the platform, 2012
