= Fridhemsplan =

Square in Stockholm, Sweden

Coordinates: 59°19′56″N 18°1′44.2″E

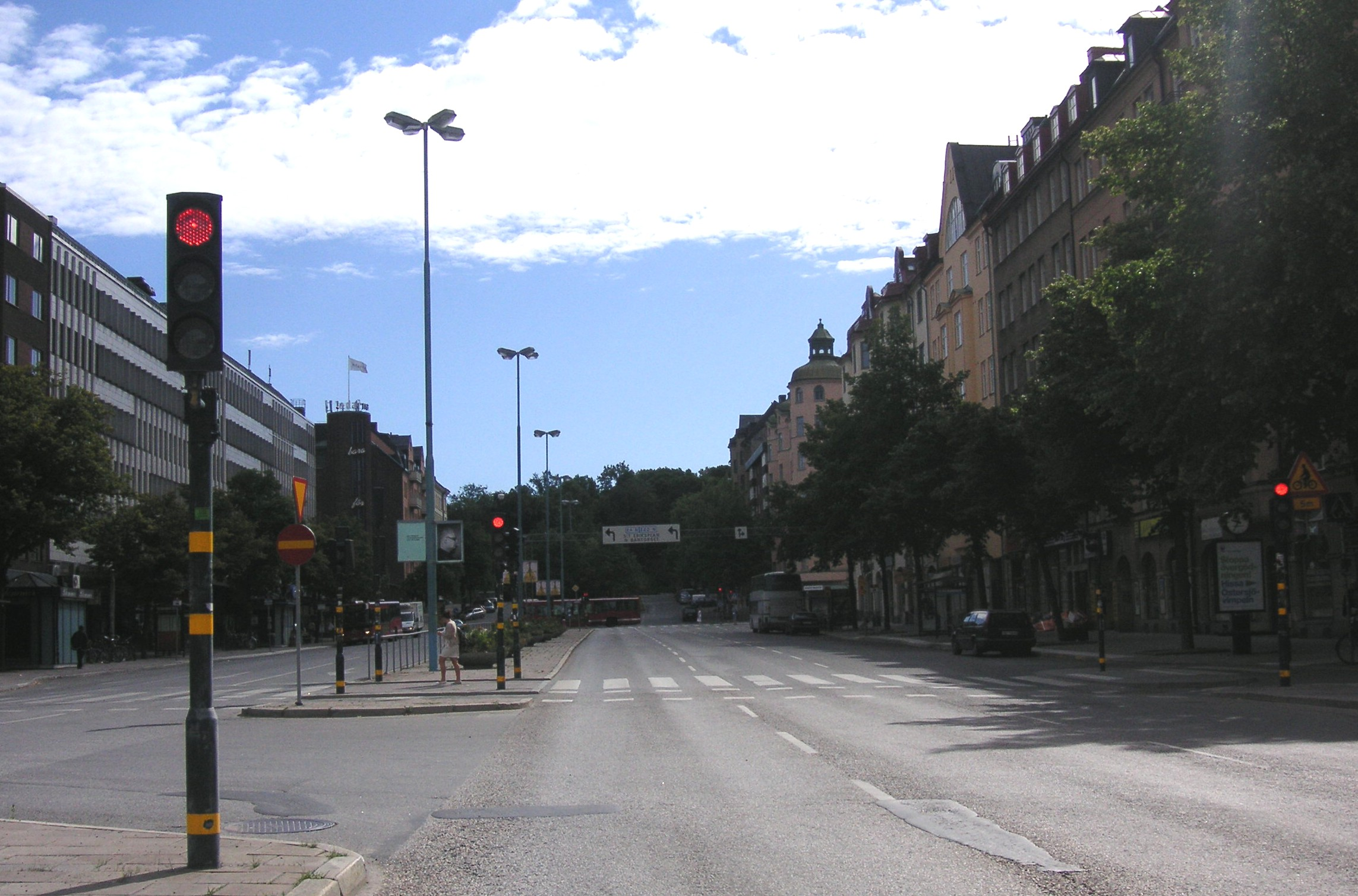
Fridhemsplan

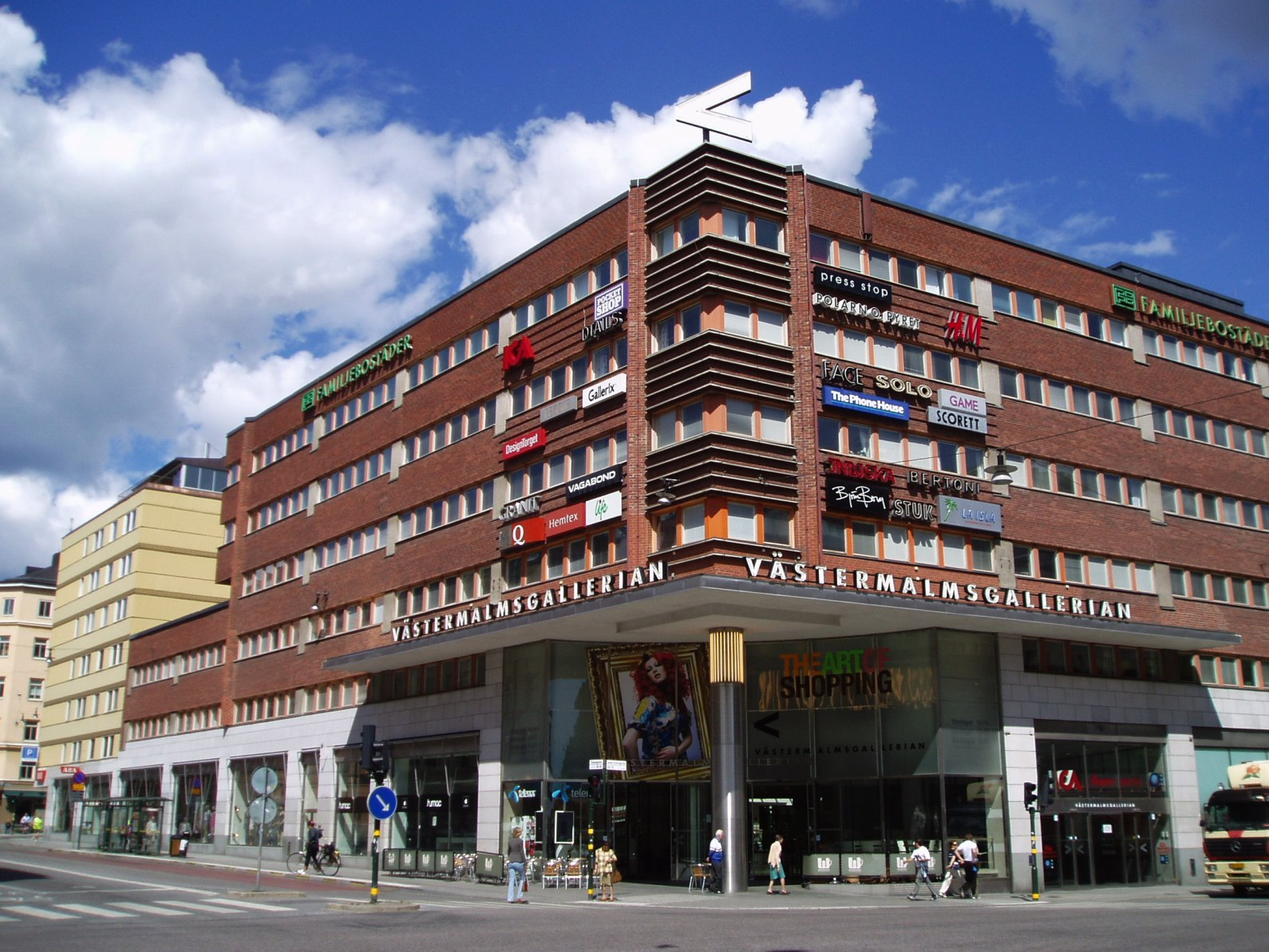
Västermalmsgallerian

Fridhemsplan is a square at the intersection of Fridhemsgatan and Drottningholmsvägen in the districts of Kungsholmen and Marieberg in Stockholm, Sweden.

== Description ==
The name Fridhemsplan was given 1935, after the major street Fridhemsgatan crossing the area. Before that, the area was simply known as Kungsholmen toll station. At Fridhemsplan metro station, the blue and the green lines of the Stockholm Metro intersect. The green line had a station on Fridhemsplan, and in 1975, the blue line was completed.

The adjacent shopping mall, Västermalmsgallerian, was inaugurated on 23 August 2002. It targets young middle-class customers of the surrounding area. The shopping centre is in a renovated building from the 1970s and replaced the underground "square" at the intersection of Sankt Eriksgatan and Fleminggatan Streets. Fridhemsplan now also has a major STF hostel.

== See also ==
- Fridhemsplan metro station
