= Duvbo metro station =

Stockholm Metro station

Duvbo
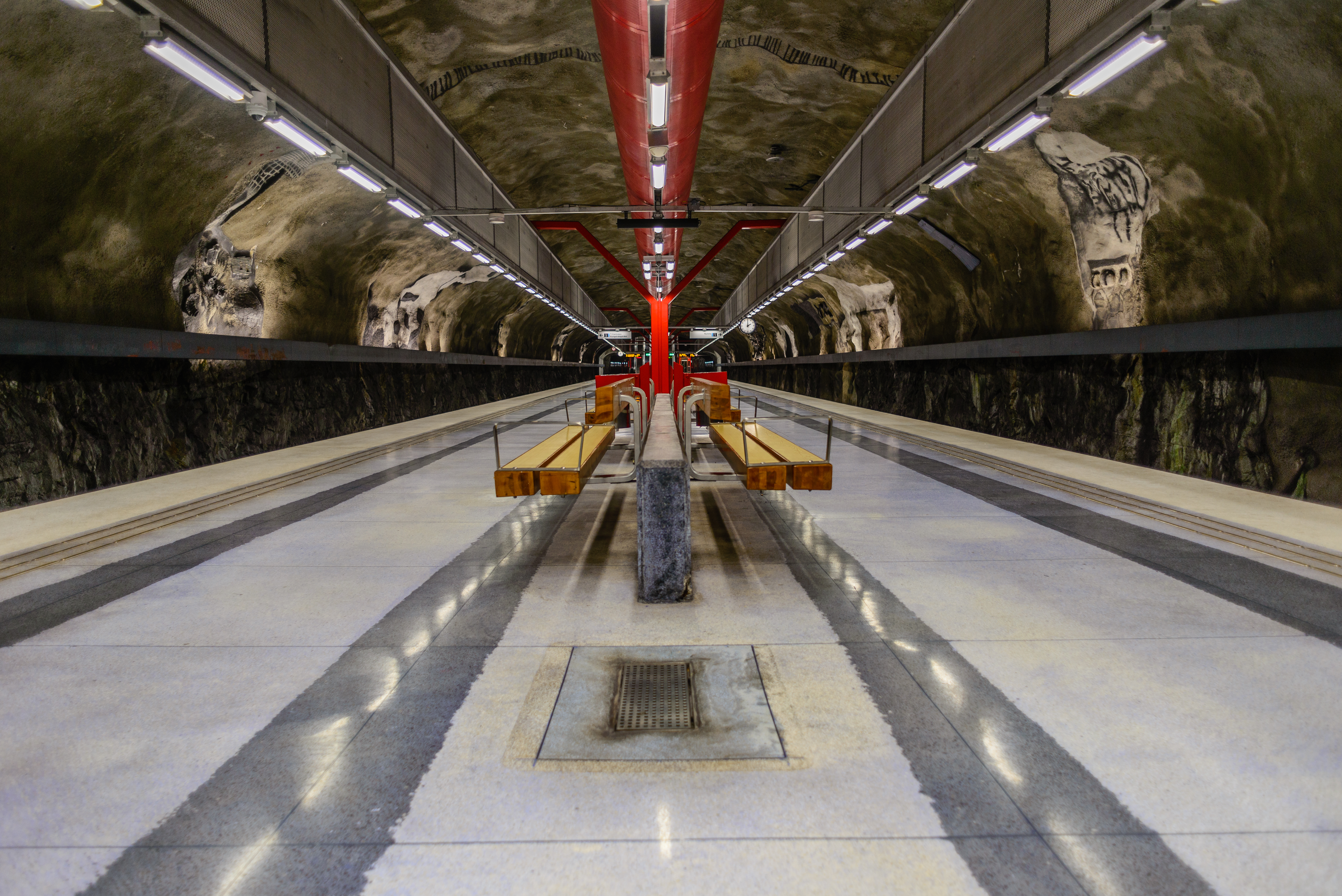

General information
- Location: Sundbyberg
- Coordinates: 59°22′4″N 17°57′52″E
- Elevation: 10.3 m (34 ft) below sea level
- System: Stockholm Metro station
- Owner: Storstockholms Lokaltrafik
- Platforms: 1 island platform
- Tracks: 2

Construction
- Structure type: Underground
- Depth: 20–35 m (66–115 ft) below ground
- Accessible: Yes

Other information
- Station code: DUV

History
- Opened: 18 August 1985; 41 years ago

Passengers
- 2019: 2,450 boarding per weekday

Services
Preceding station	Stockholm Metro	Following station
Sundbybergs centrum towards Kungsträdgården	Line 10	Rissne towards Hjulsta
Location
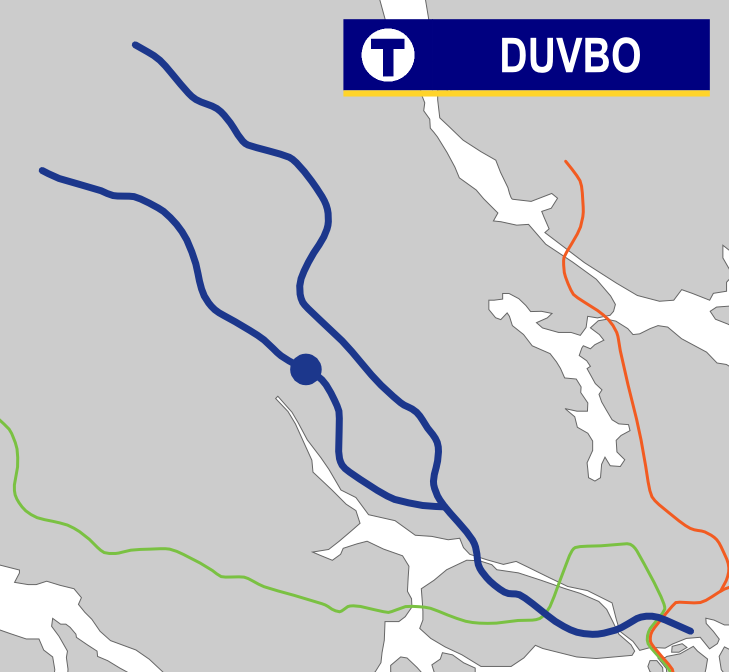

Duvbo metro station is a station on the Blue Line of the Stockholm Metro, located in Central Sundbyberg in Sundbyberg Municipality. It is named after the nearby Duvbo area. The station was inaugurated on 18 August 1985 as part of the extension to between Västra skogen and Rinkeby. It became the 98th station of Stockholm metro.

== Gallery ==
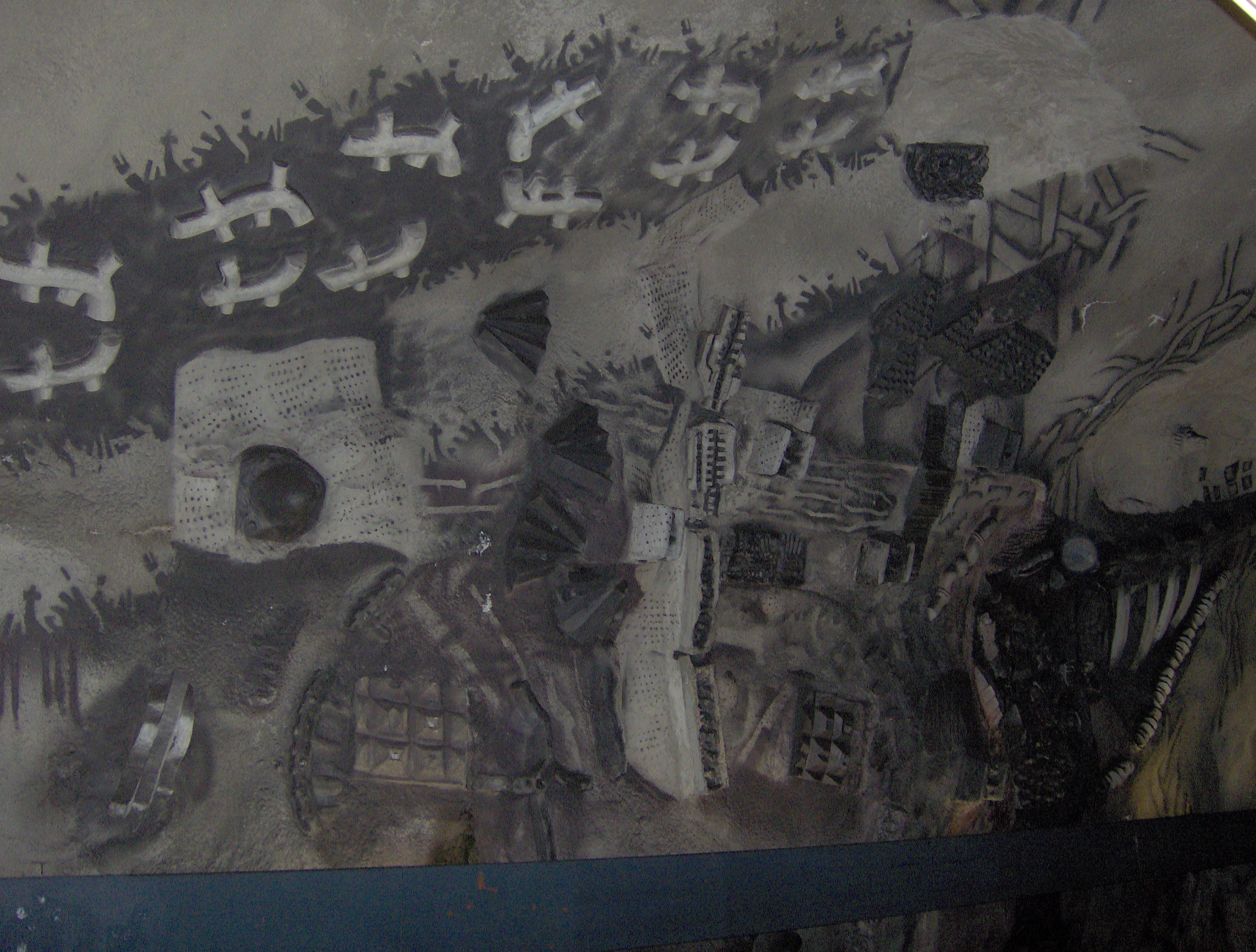
Station's artwork

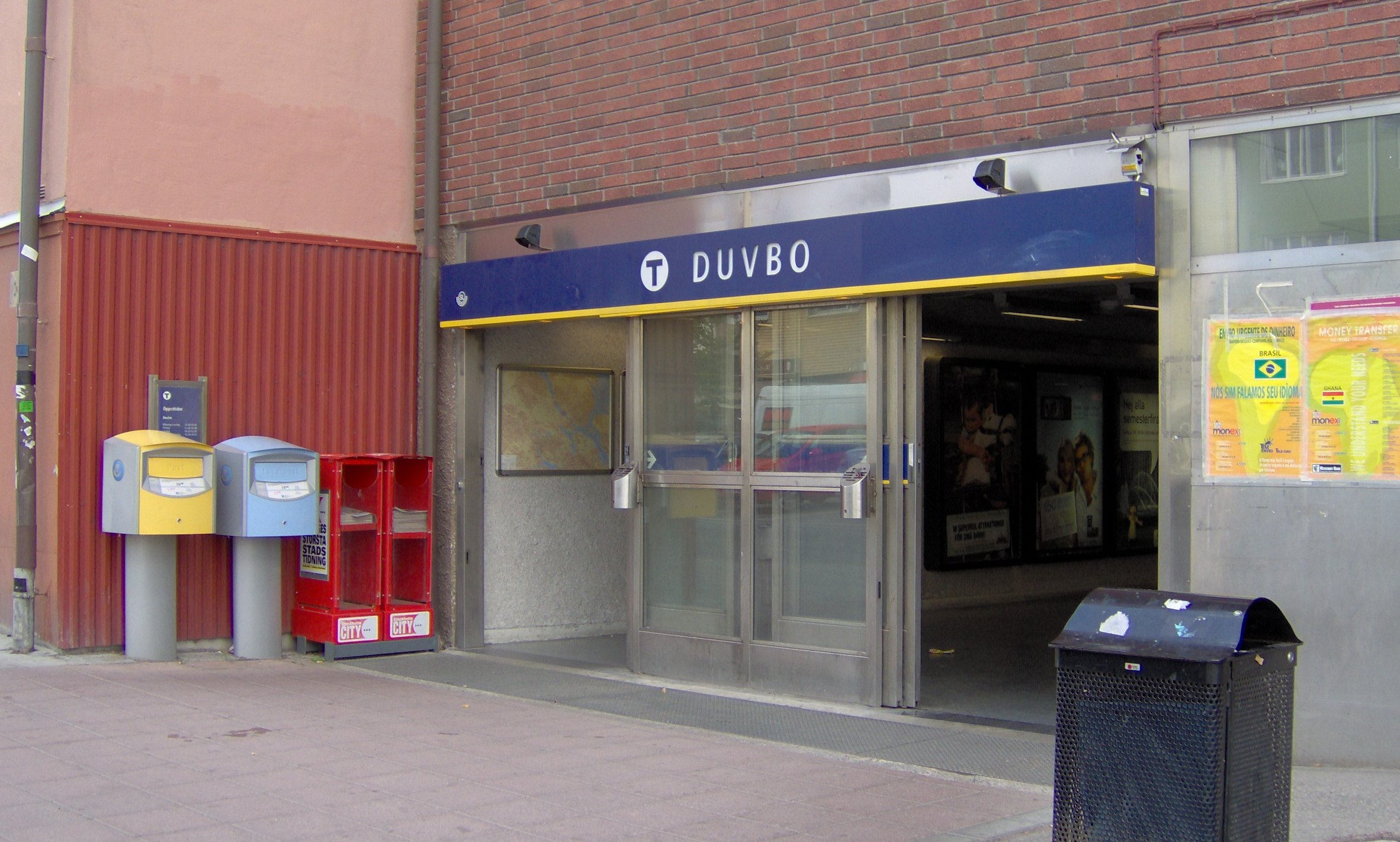
Entrance, at Tulegatan

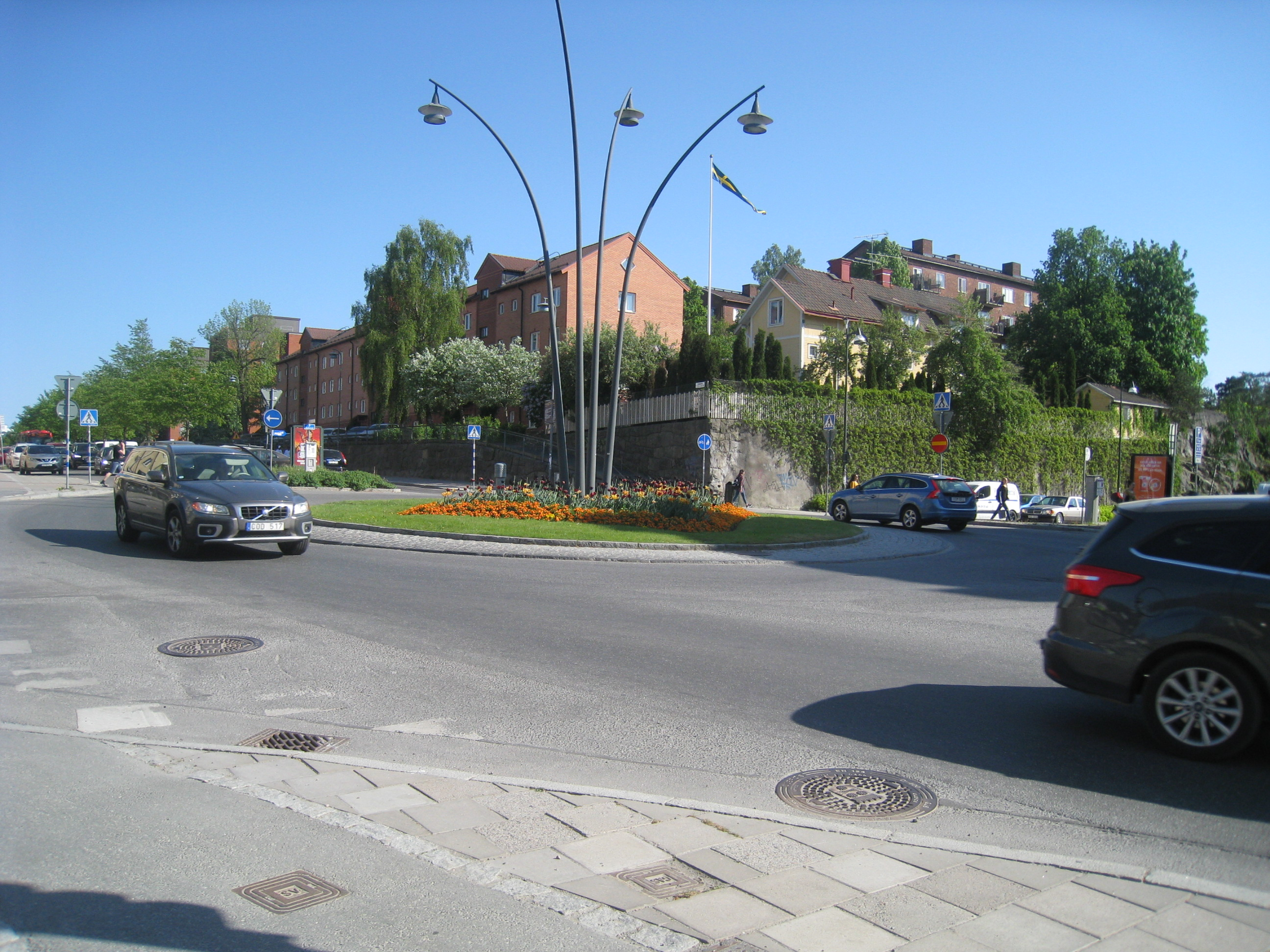
The Fredsgatan-Tulegatan roundabout, 50m from the entrance
