= Rissne metro station =

Stockholm Metro station

Rissne

General information
- Location: Rissne, Sundbyberg
- Coordinates: 59°22′33″N 17°56′23″E
- Elevation: 5.54 m (18.2 ft) below sea level
- System: Stockholm Metro station
- Owner: Storstockholms Lokaltrafik
- Platforms: 1 island platform
- Tracks: 2

Construction
- Structure type: Underground
- Depth: 25–40 m (82–131 ft) below ground
- Accessible: Yes

Other information
- Station code: RIS

History
- Opened: 18 August 1985; 41 years ago

Passengers
- 2019: 6,000 boarding per weekday

Services
Preceding station	Stockholm Metro	Following station
Duvbo towards Kungsträdgården	Line 10	Rinkeby towards Hjulsta
Location
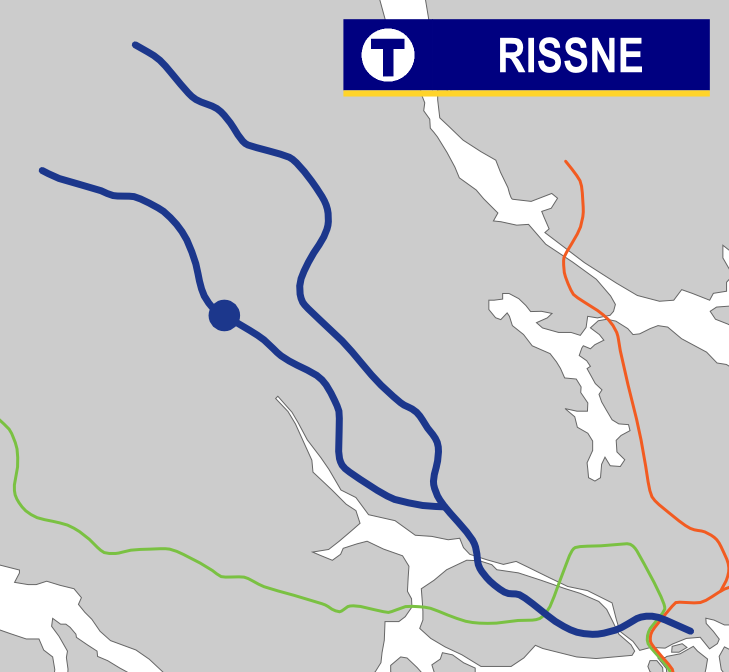

Rissne metro station is a station on the Blue Line of the Stockholm Metro, located in Rissne, Sundbyberg Municipality. The station was inaugurated on 18 August 1985 as part of the extension between Västra skogen and Rinkeby. The station is 10.4 kilometers (6.5 mi) from Kungsträdgården. The station is located in caverns 25–40 meters (82–131 feet) below Rissne Square, where the ticket hall is situated. There is a submitted timeline of historic events in the station, from 3000 BCE to the 1980s, by Madeleine Dranger and Rolf H. Reimers.

== Gallery ==
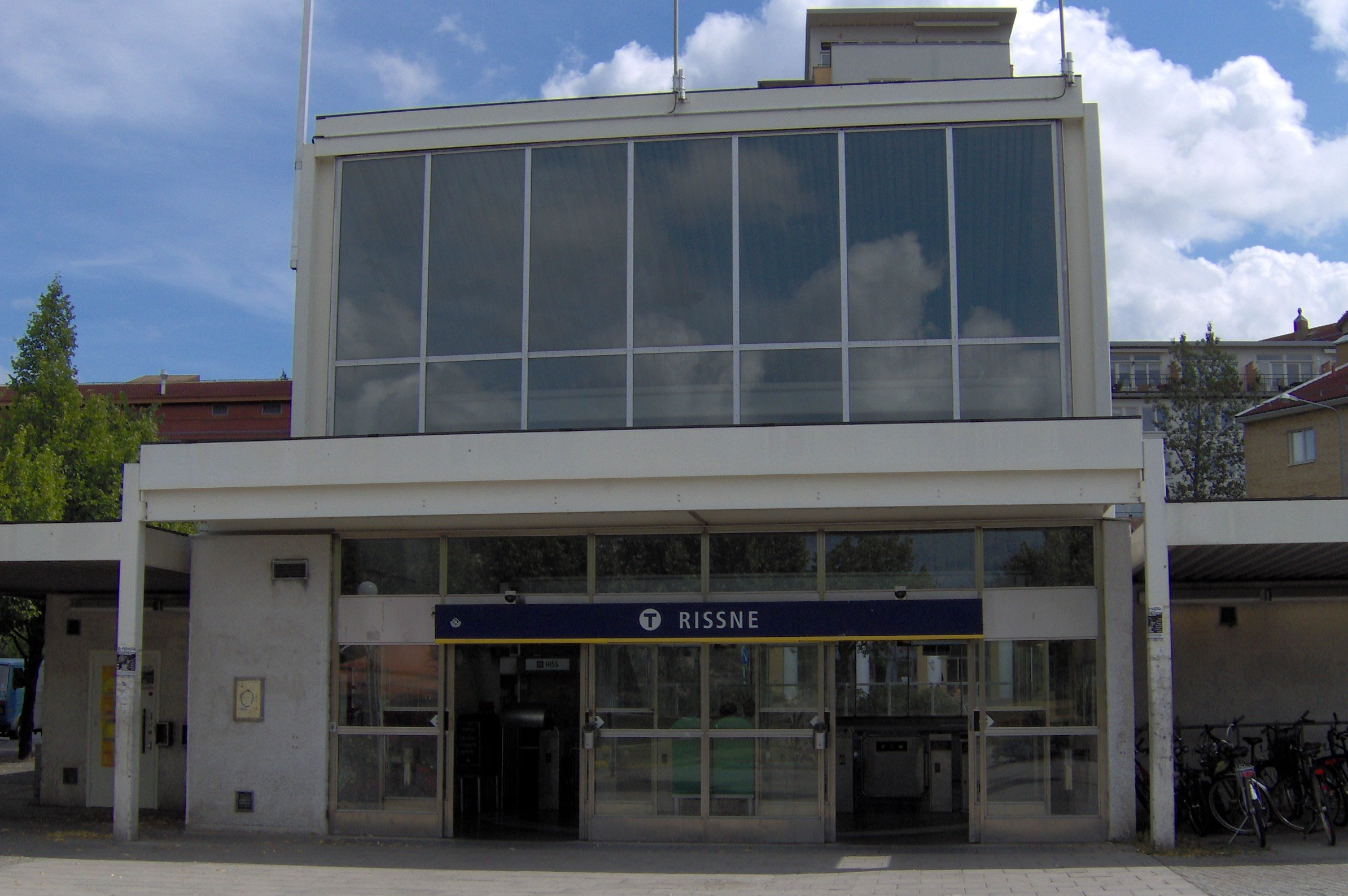
Entrance

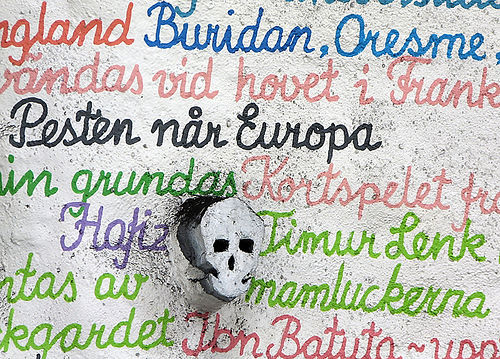
Station art detail
