= The New Museum (Sweden) =

Private museum in Stockholm, Sweden

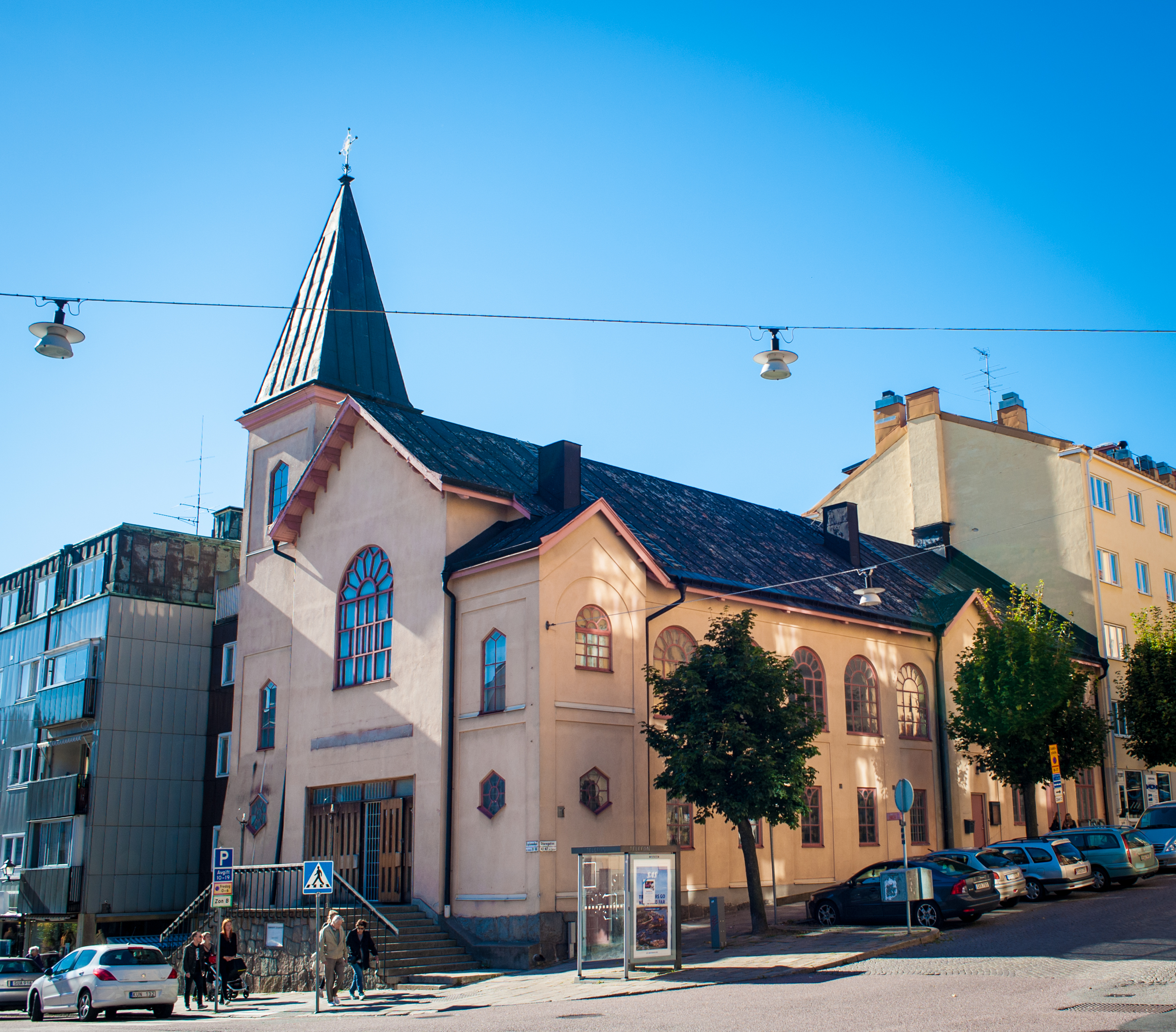
The New Museum (Det Nya Museet)

The New Museum (Swedish: Det Nya Museet) is a private museum located in the previous Mission Covenant Church in Sundbyberg, Stockholm, Sweden.

== History ==
The museum is housed in the former Mission Covenant Church, also known as the Bethlehem Church, which was designed in 1904 by Frans Lindskog and was built between 1904 and 1909. The Mission Church, which is 675 square meters (7,270 sq ft), is located in the corner of Sturegatan-Esplanaden in Central Sundbyberg. The Mission Church was part of the revival movement in Sweden which emerged during the 19th century modeled on that of England. The church was no longer used as a church as of 2005. It stood empty until 2008, when the art gallery Marabouparken used the building for some time as an exhibition hall.

== Building ==
Since the church was built in 1909, it has undergone a number of changes and remodeling. The direction of the entrance staircase was redesigned in 1931 from facing the esplanade to instead running parallel to the street. Extensive changes to the building were made both externally and internally from the 1950s to 1970s. Among other things, the large gable window was reduced in size and was given a modernist-influenced, irregular design. On the tower, parts of the plaster decoration were removed together with decorative work. The entrance area was also redesigned with the current teak and glass finish, while the staircase was fitted with a contemporary wrought-iron banister. The visibility of the church in the cityscape changed with the construction of the adjacent residential building in 1959–1960. From having had space around the building, the church came to constitute the corner of the block. The residential building had a major impact on the lighting conditions, as the church's southern windows were built earlier. The original color of the building was white, and the present reddish-brown color was added to the church during a facade renovation in 1973.
