= Hjulsta =

Suburb of Stockholm, Sweden

Coordinates: 59°23′48″N 17°53′59″E

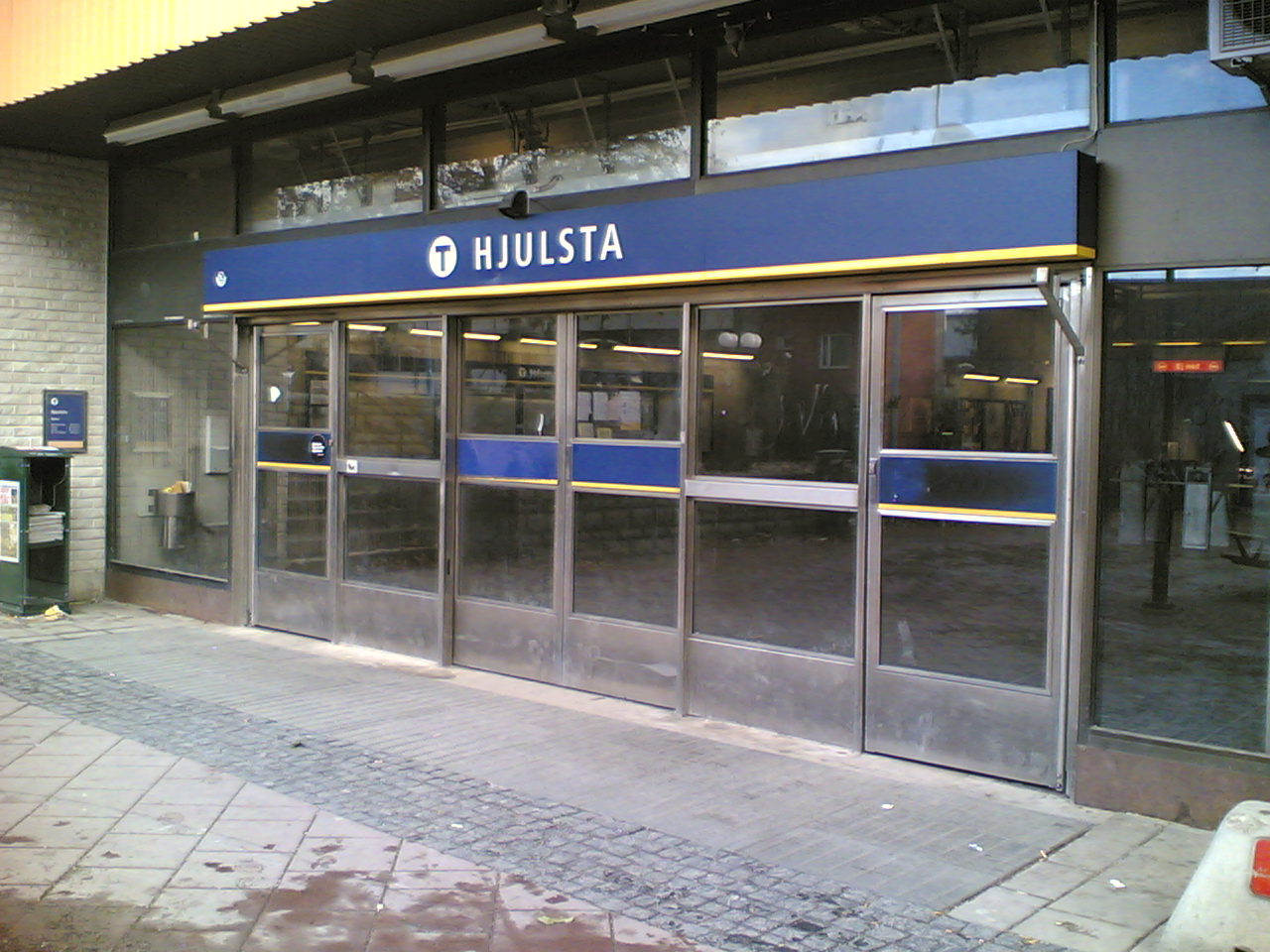
Tunnelbana station in Hjulsta.

Hjulsta, a suburb of Stockholm known for its working-class roots, is often associated with Tensta but boasts its own subway station. Hjulsta is considered an informal area part of Tensta. This station, the terminal point of the Blue Line, has been operational since 1975.

In the 2020 census, the population was recorded as 4,481.

The name ‘Hjulsta’ for the contemporary urban area is derived from an ancient village that existed in the vicinity since at least the 1480s.

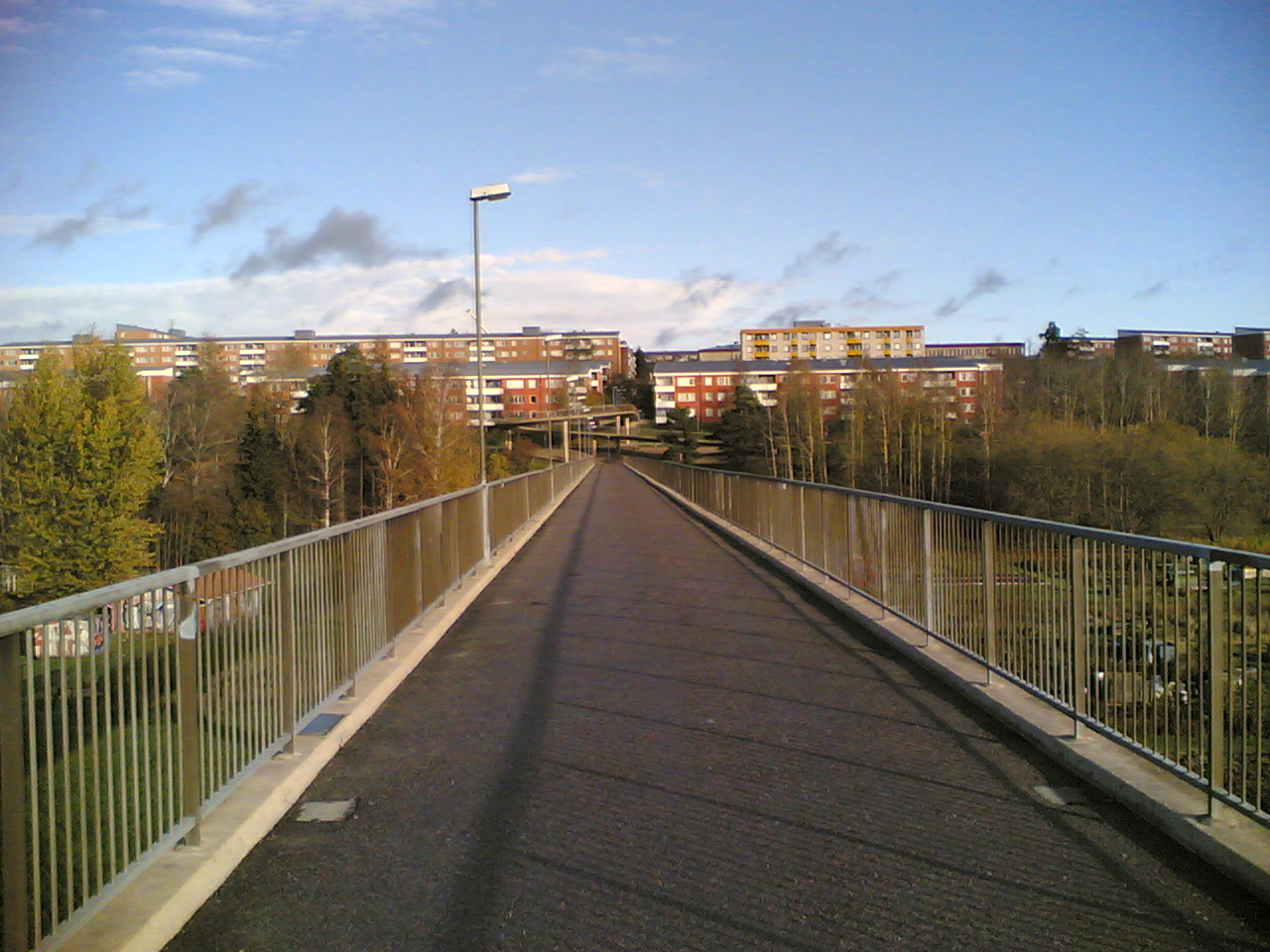
Hjulsta suburb.

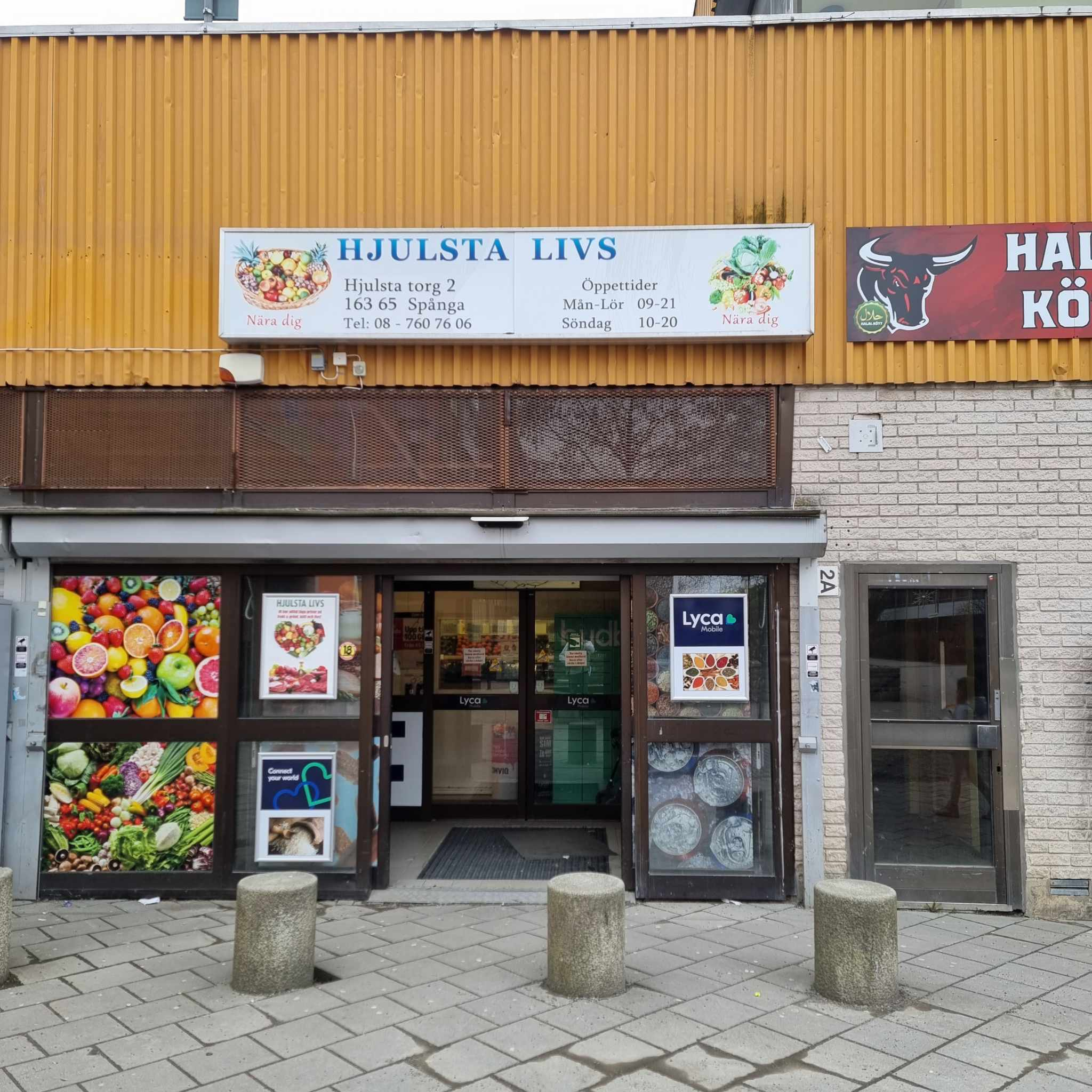
Grocery store called Lulu Livs located near Metro station

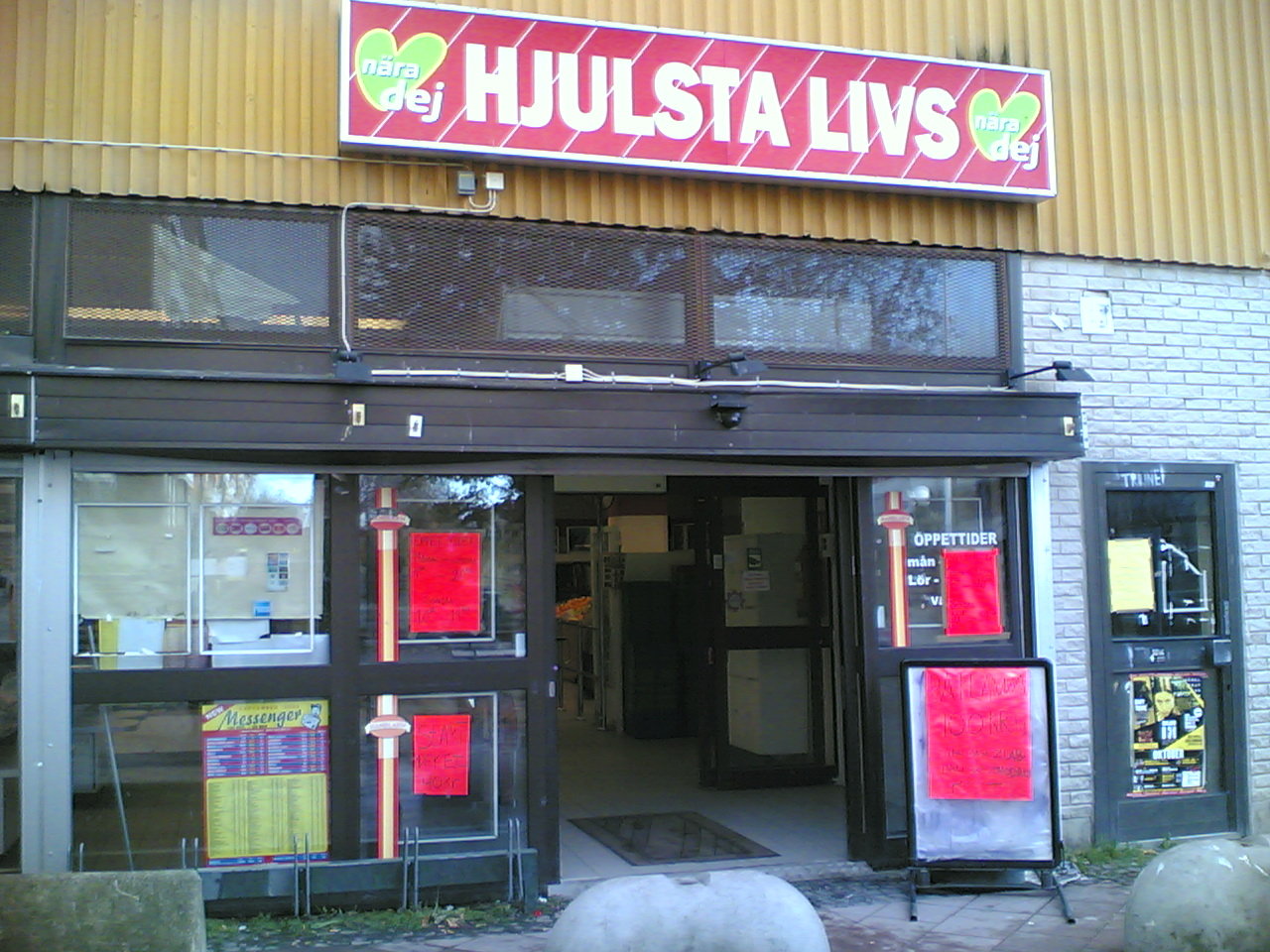
Local grocery store near Hjulsta Tunnelbana station.

== History ==
Hjulsta Gård which has been changed to Hjulsta, was known for its farm and village since the 1480s, is situated south of Enköpingsvägen, approximately 600 meters from the Hjulsta junction. The farm was initially part of Ålstens gård during the 1600s and 1700s before becoming part of Åkeshov. The village, once home to several cottages, was unfortunately demolished in the late 1960s.

Hjulsta square is the location of the entrance to the Hjulsta subway station. A football field can be found in the direction of E18. The area is predominantly filled with four-story rental buildings. In spring 2008, two new high-rise buildings were completed and ready for residents. These apartment buildings were originally owned by Svenska Bostäder but were sold to real estate company Einar Mattsson in the summer of 2008.

Beyond the rental properties, Hjulsta Backar street is home to 14 privately owned townhouses. These houses were ready for residents in 2007 and were all sold within the same year. These townhouses were constructed as part of the Tensta Housing Fair 2006, also known as TenstaBo 06, which took place from August 17 to August 27, 2006, in the Tensta district.

One could reach Hjulsta via the country road (now Enköpingsvägen) or by water. Long ago, Spångaån constituted a narrow waterway to travel on, as the river formed a slender bay of Mälaren. Those who lived here arrived by boat more than a thousand years ago. Archaeological excavations have proven that people from the Viking Age and even earlier lived in the vicinity of Hjulsta. Hjulsta has been inhabited by farmers since the early Middle Ages.

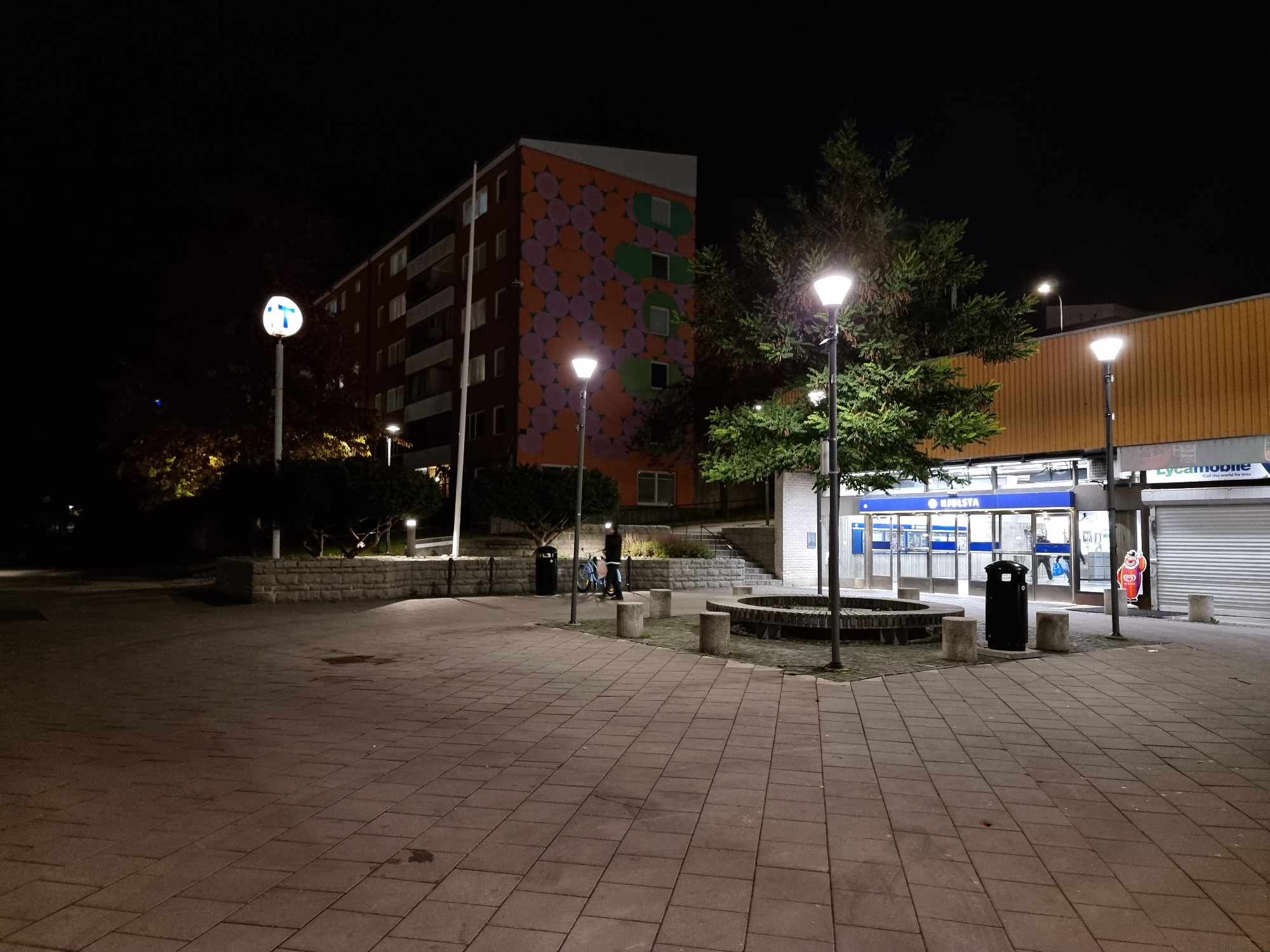
Hjulsta Square

Hjulsta farm and village have been known since the 1480s. It was located south of today's Enköpingsvägen, about 600 meters south of the Hjulsta junction. The oldest written records report two homesteads that were owned by different noble families for a long time. The farm belonged to Ålstens farm in the 1600s and 1700s, thereafter the farm belonged to Åkeshov Castle. The two homesteads were farmed under both Ålsten and Åkeshov among others. The village had several cottages, but was demolished at the end of the 1960s. The Stora Tensta farm in the Stora Tensta block was demolished in 1966.

== Etymology ==
In 1486, the village of Hjulsta was spelled ‘i hiwlista’. The suffix of the name likely includes the plural of the Old Swedish word ‘stadher’, which means place or location. How the prefix should be interpreted is very uncertain. Previously, it has been assumed that the ‘Hjul-’ found in several Swedish place names would correspond to the unverified Old Swedish nickname ‘Hiule’.

== Hjulsta metro station ==
The subway station is served by the Blue Line of the Stockholm Metro. The station was put into operation on August 31, 1975, when the first part of the Blue Line was inaugurated. The entrance is from the southern end at Hjulsta square.

The artwork adorning the station is the collective effort of various artists. This includes Sjöfåglar by Christina Rundqvist-Andersson, Sista skörden i norra Botkyrka by Olle Magnusson, and Landbyska verken vid Engelbrektsplan år 1890’ by Ruth Rydfeldt.

== See also ==
- Hjulsta metro station
