= Rissne =

Neighborhood in Stockholm, Sweden

Coordinates: 59°22′33″N 17°56′23″E

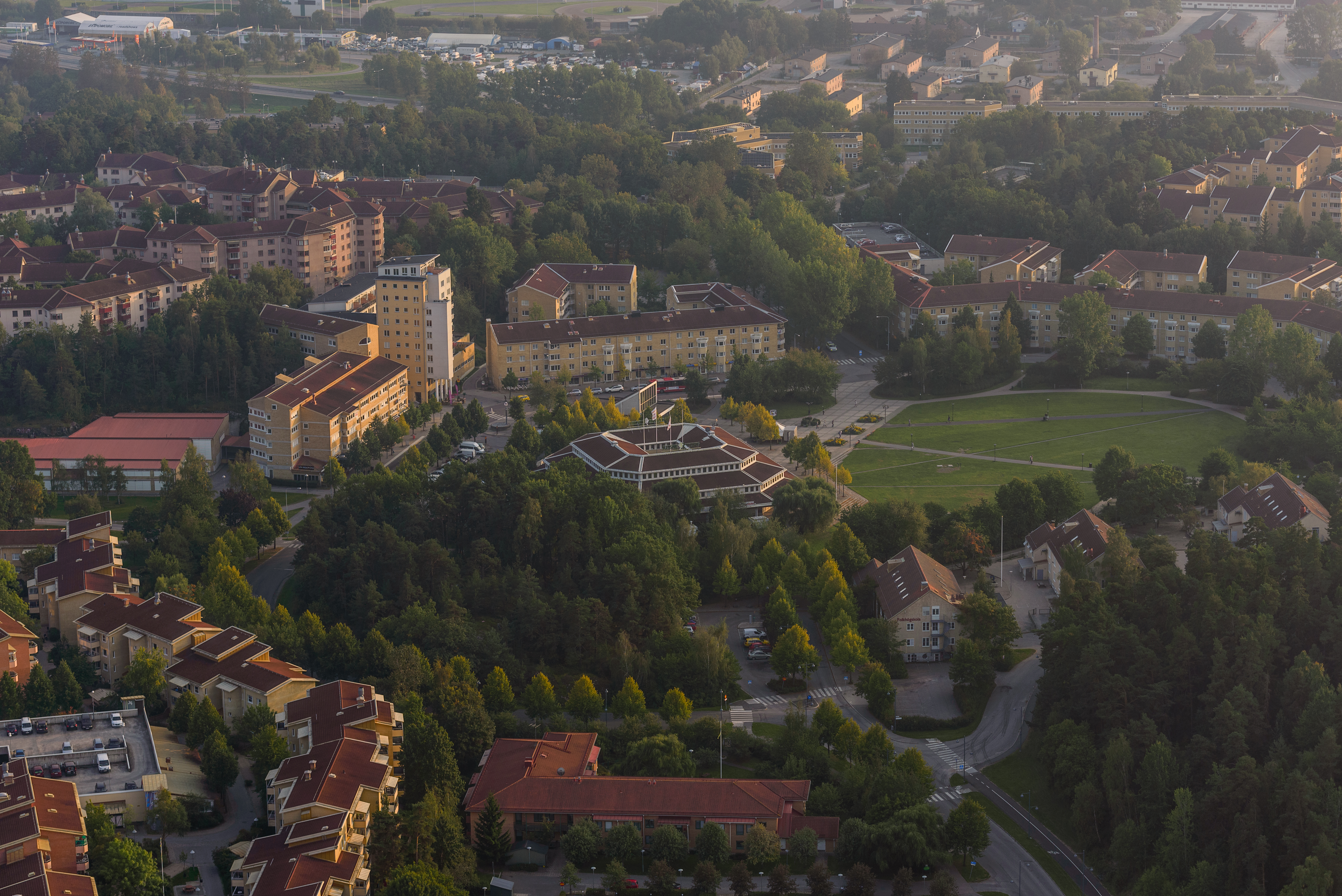
Flight photo Rissne

Rissne is a neighborhood in the western part of Sundbyberg Municipality, Stockholm, Sweden. It has about 7500 inhabitants and borders to Stora Ursvik in the north, Duvbo and Hallonbergen in the east, and in the west and south to Bromsten, the latter one within Västerort in Stockholm Municipality. The area belonged to what used to be Spånga municipality until its dissolution in 1949, when it for example together with Duvbo was transferred to Sundbybergs stad. The name comes from Risö, which was the name that the Vikings used. The Svea Artillery Regiment had its camp there until 1960. An apartment block was built 1982 to 1988. The street names in the area hints to the site's military history. (Lavettvägen, Kavallerivägen, Pjäsbacken, Artillerivägen, and Skvadronsbacken) and on the many relics (including graves) contained in Rissne (Mjölnerbacken, Odalvägen, Valkyriavägen).

== Residential Area ==
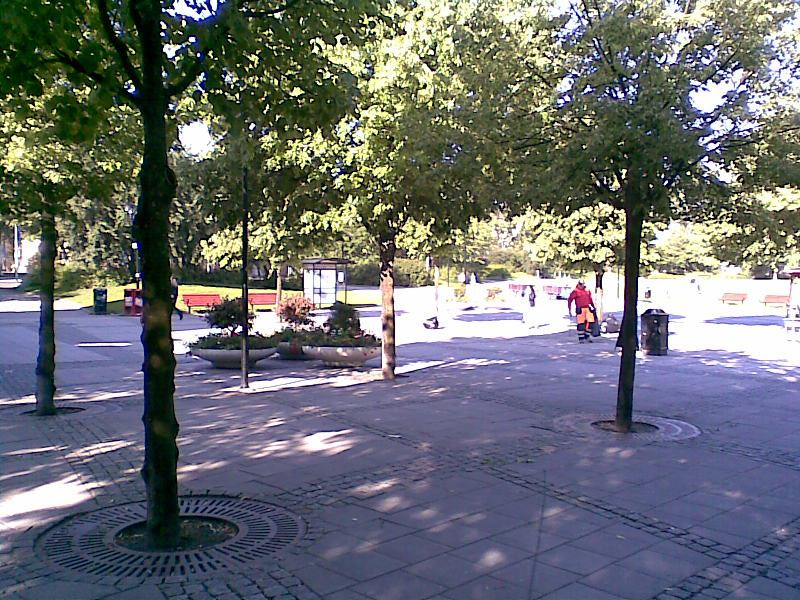
Rissne square

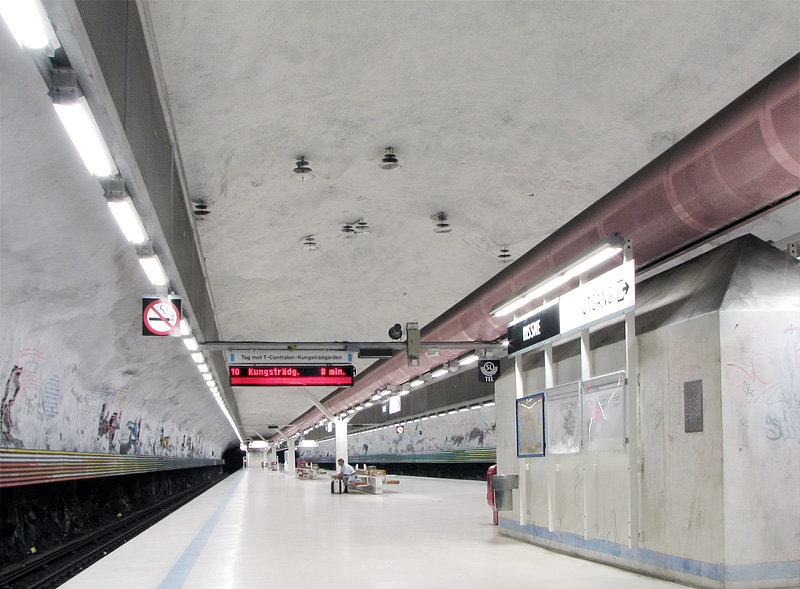
Rissne Metro Station

The residential area is located on a plateau in the middle of Rissne. Apartment blocks have been built around Rissne square and the large lawn in the center of the plateau and also on the nearby hills. The buildings consist largely of low to medium polish and brick houses on a courtyard setting with intermediate walking paths with a continuous construction since the 1980s. There are two smaller terraced areas (Duvboskogen and Grönkulla named by the constructor) they were built in the 2000s and later. The lack of thoroughfare makes traffic volume low in the area. In 2010 there were 3151 flats in the area of which 70% of them were allotted for rent and 30% of them were of condominium. Approximately sixty sculptures made by famous Swedish artists are placed in the residential area. Rissne is considered by the Swedish police a ”vulnerable area” with problems of high crime.

== History ==
The area was inhabited as early as the Middle Ages. Back then Rissne was nothing more than a rural consisting of Rissne farm, cropland and forest. The farm was mentioned in early medieval documents

The secretary of the Admiralty, Reinhold Goevert Leuhusen acquired the farm in 1640. During the 17th century Erik Dahlberg made a sketch of the farm, according to the sketch the farm-house had 4 floors. The courtyard was covered by Charles XI reduction and became crown property in 1692. Rissne farm was used for military purpose until 1811. Due to decay the top 2 floors was demolished because of the tenant Karl Edmund Bennet. Since 1983 the estate has been protected by heritage building decided by Sundbybergs municipality. The house was restored 1992.

Mounds in Rissne have been used for archaeological research. The height on the mounds and the gifts indicates that Rissne was inhabited by the high society.

== Business ==
In the northwestern Rissne Skandinaviska Enskilda Banken (SEB) has a large office complex in Bankhus 90. The smaller office complexes Valla Park and Rissne Office Center is located closer to Rissne square.

== Demographics ==
Rissne is the second largest (in terms of population) district in Sundbyberg Municipality, where Centrala Sundbyberg is the largest. At the end of year 2011, 7,512 inhabitants lived in Rissne, which corresponds to 19.0% of the total inhabitants living in the municipality. Throughout urban planning it's expected that the population of Rissne is going to rise above 10 000 inhabitants at the year of 2025. Year 2011 was 55,3% of the population born in a foreign country (72% from Europe) and 20,6% had parents that were born in a foreign country (which means that a total of 75.3% of the population had a foreign background according to the concept used by the Swedish authorities).

Rissne is home to a significant Uyghur community.
