= Tensta metro station =

Stockholm Metro station

Tensta
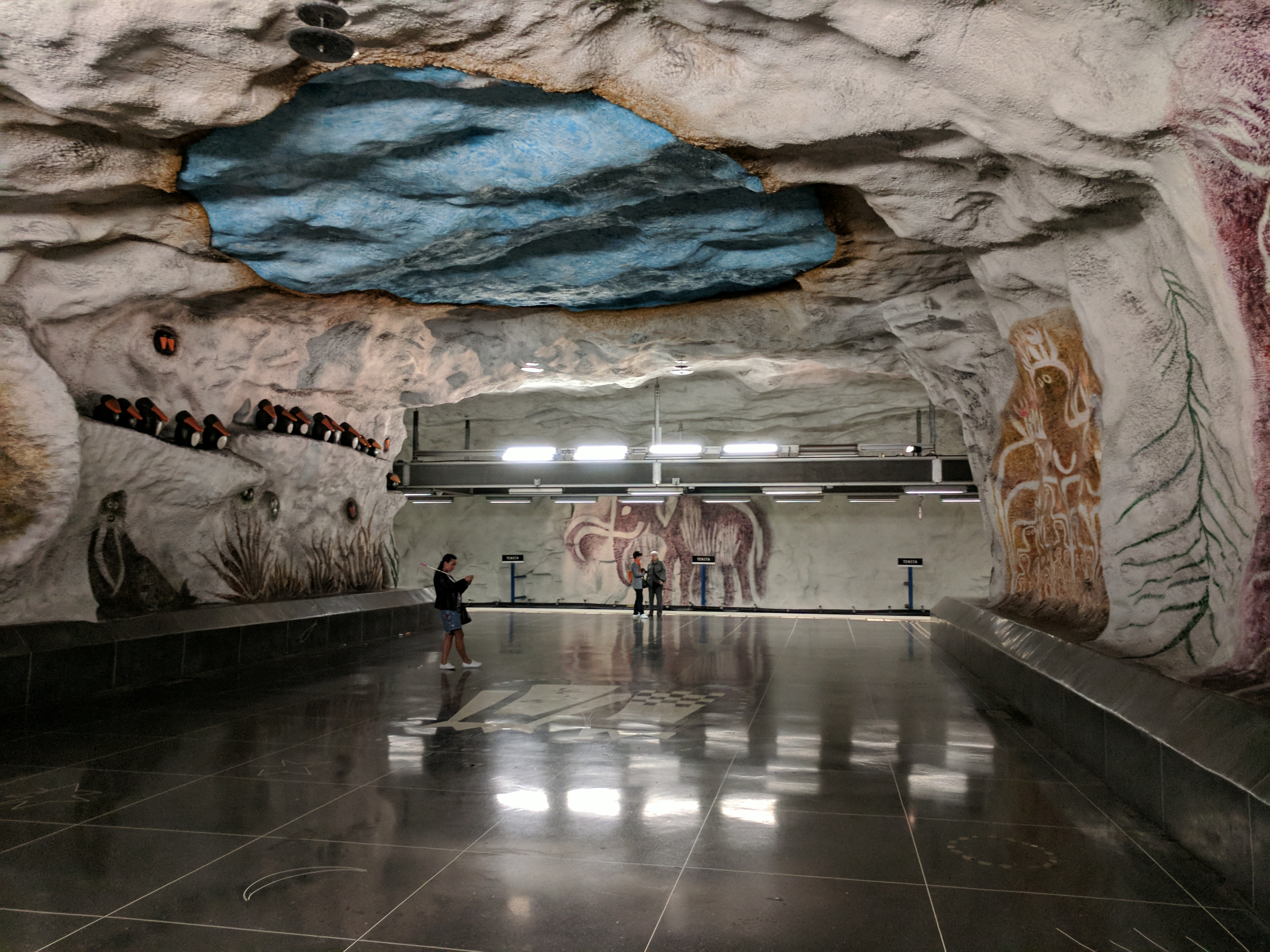
- Platform cavern

General information
- Location: Tensta
- Coordinates: 59°23′38″N 17°54′07″E
- Elevation: 2.5 m (8.2 ft) below sea level
- System: Stockholm Metro station
- Owner: Storstockholms Lokaltrafik
- Platforms: 1 island platform
- Tracks: 2

Construction
- Structure type: Underground
- Depth: 20–22 m (66–72 ft) below ground
- Accessible: Yes

Other information
- Station code: TEN

History
- Opened: 31 August 1975; 51 years ago

Passengers
- 2019: 6,350 boarding per weekday

Services
Preceding station	Stockholm Metro	Following station
Rinkeby towards Kungsträdgården	Line 10	Hjulsta Terminus
Location
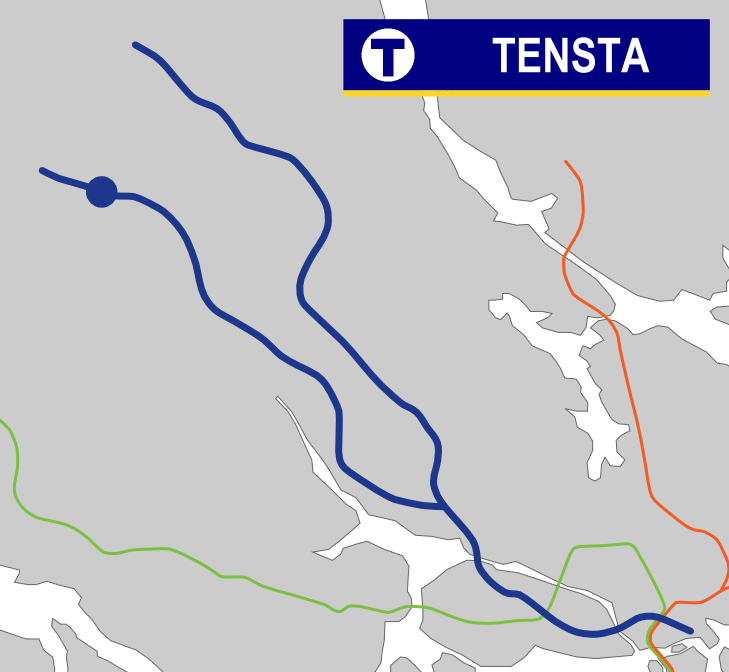

Tensta metro station is a station on the Blue Line of the Stockholm Metro, located in the district of Tensta. The station was opened on 31 August 1975 as part the first stretch of the Blue Line between T-Centralen and Hjulsta. The trains were running via Hallonbergen and Rinkeby. The distance to Kungsträdgården is 13.5 km (8.4 mi).

== Gallery ==
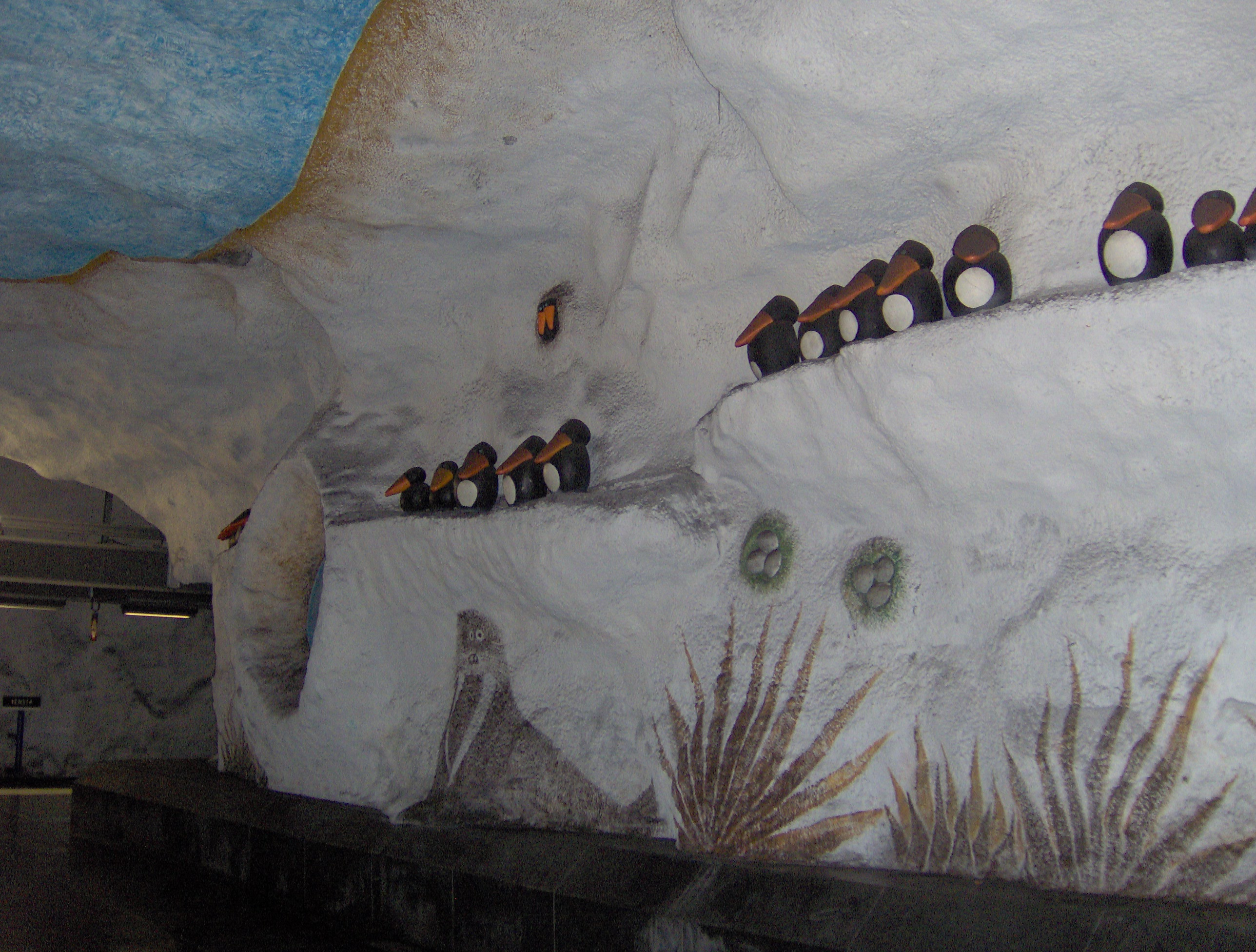
Station art detail

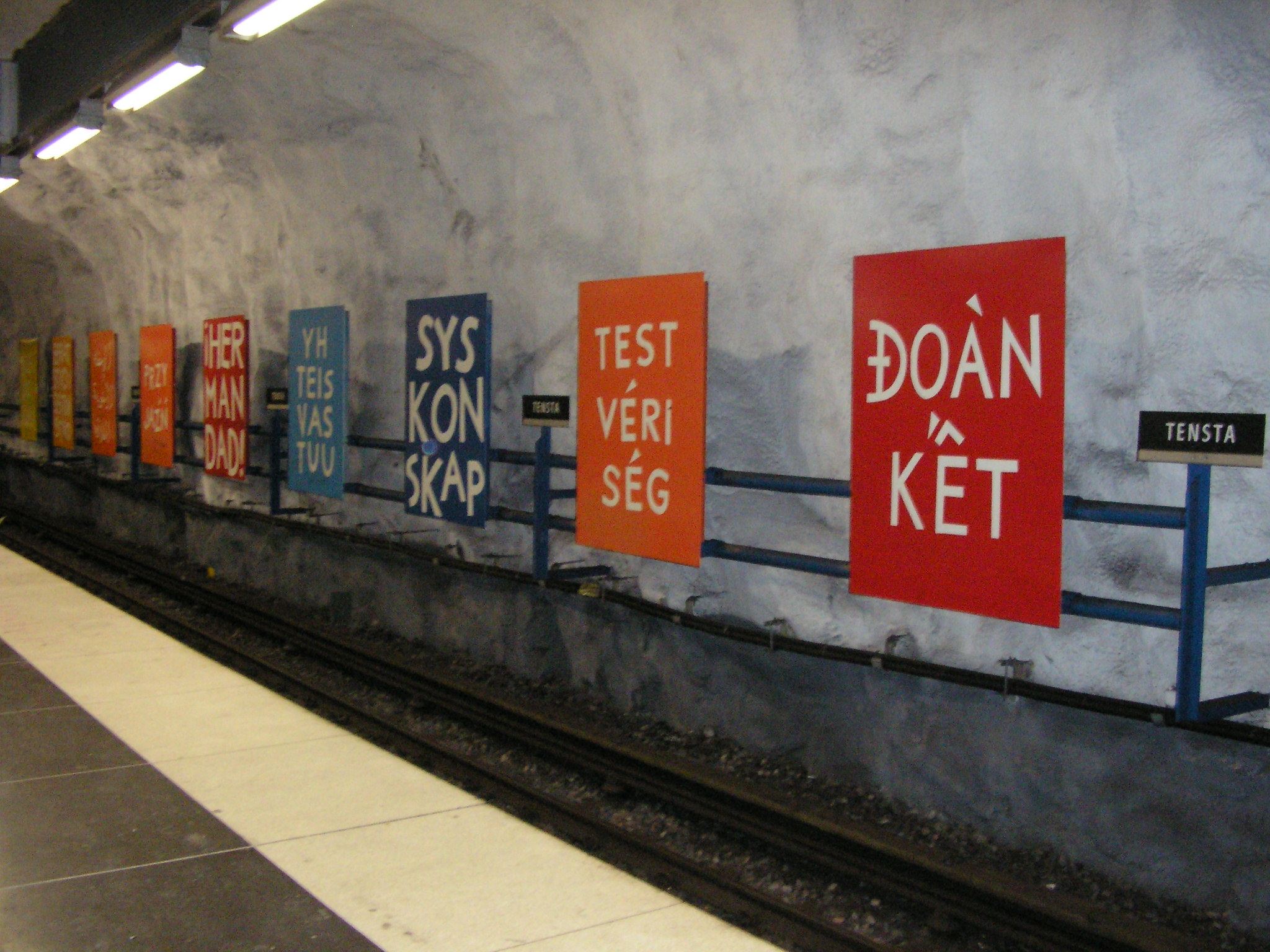
Art featuring words from world languages
