= Sundbyberg Church =

Church in Sundbyberg Municipality, Sweden

Coordinates: 59°21′51″N 17°58′22″E

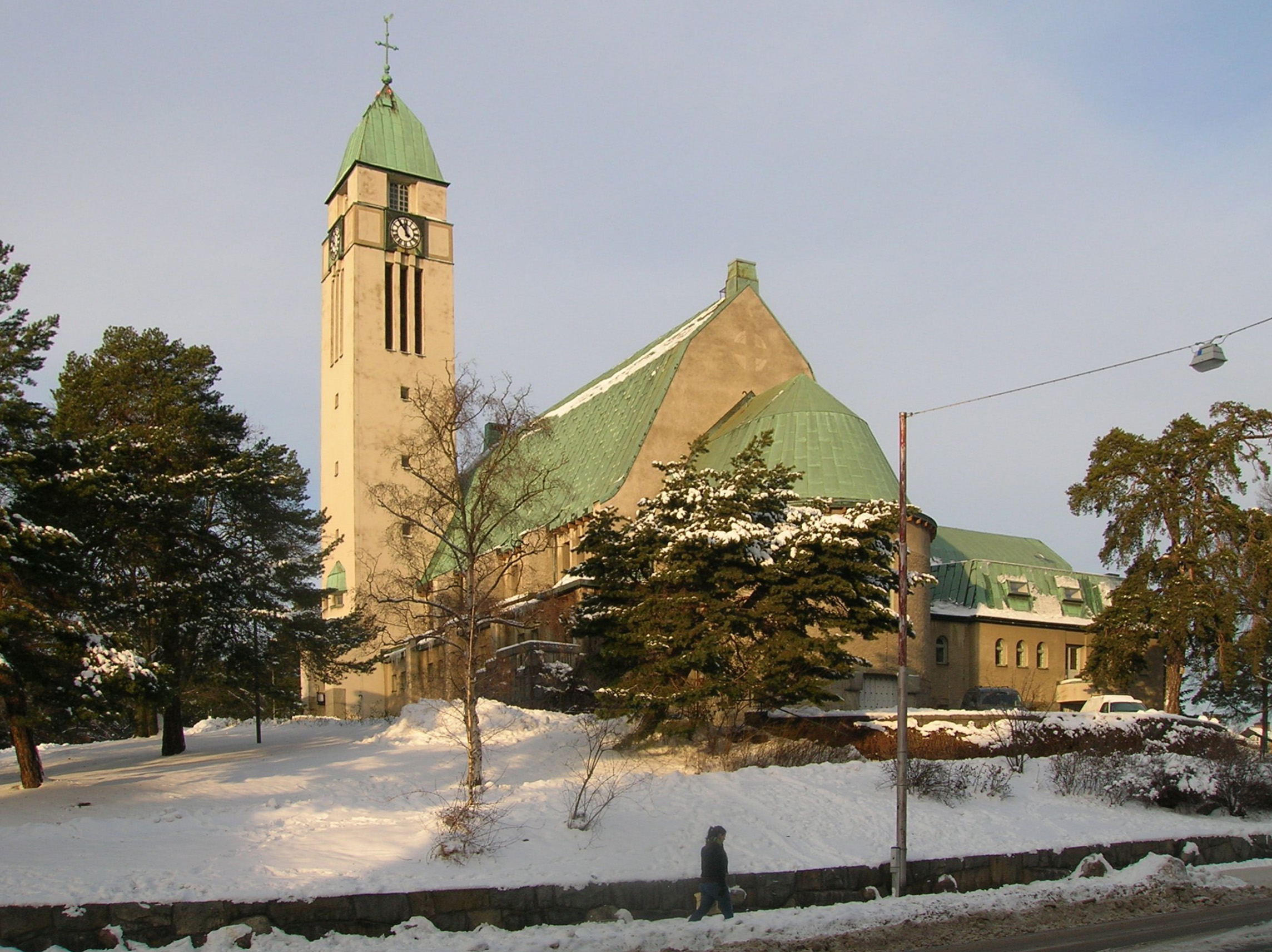
Sundbyberg Church.

Sundbyberg Church is the main church of Sundbyberg, in Sweden, and is a part of the Church of Sweden. It is located in Central Sundbyberg, on Rosengatan 15. Opened in 1911, it was built in a Swedish church building architecture after drawings of architect Axel Sjögren (1877-1962).

== History ==
The construction of the Sundbyberg church, known for its stained glass panels, began in 1909, once since the beginning of that year it was already clear that community would form their own congregation. In the fall of 1910, the church was ready for consecration, but because of a dispute over the cemetery with Bromma, it was opened on 4 June 1911.

The church is a three-aisled basilica in the Art Nouveau style, clearly influenced by the slightly older Hjorthagskyrkan in Stockholm. The architect Axel Sjögren took care to give the church building clear features of Swedish national Romanticism. The church is built in an east–west direction with the choir designed as a vestibule. At the southwest side is the church tower. Parish, vestry and other areas are located in a separate part on the north side of the church. Originally in the chancel a chapel was built, but it is now used as a little church.

== Interior ==
The sanctuary, as well as the church in general, was decorated by Filip Månsson, a Swedish decorator, artist, and teacher at the Technical School in Stockholm. A stained-glass window over the altar is the work of Swedish painter and printmaker Olle Hjortzberg, and serves as the altarpiece. The subject is Christ rising from the grave, and pointing to the heavens. With the other hand he holds a scepter. The church hall's paintings are rendered by Jose Samson.
