= Duvbo =

Urban district in Sundbyberg municipality, Sweden

Coordinates: 59°22′04″N 17°57′52″E

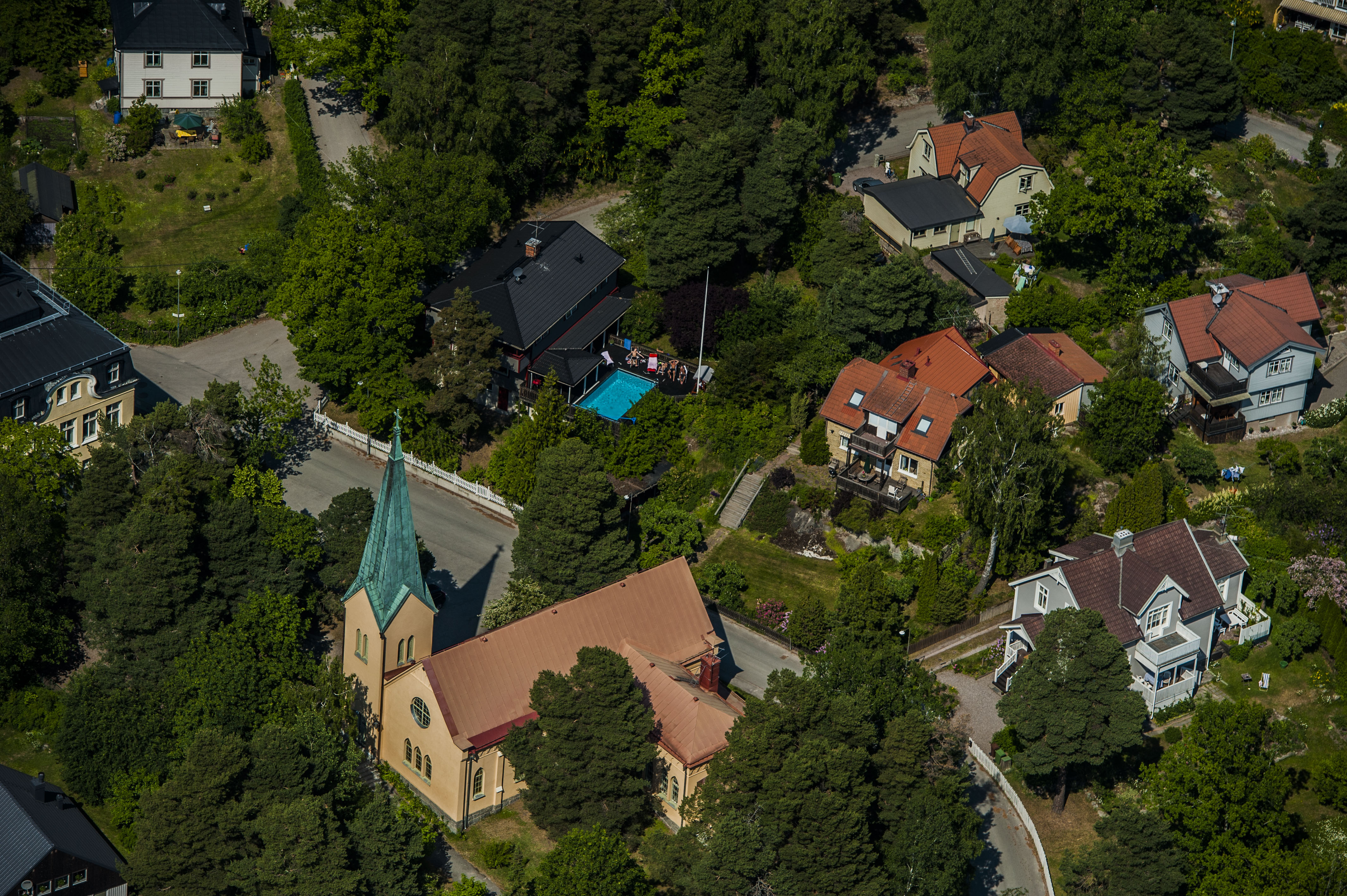
Houses in Duvbo (Alms väg)

Duvbo is a residential area in Sundbyberg in suburban Stockholm, Sweden. In 2019 it had 2217 inhabitants.

The Duvbo metro station is located in central Sundbyberg, just outside (300m) Duvbo and is part of the Stockholm Metro. It was inaugurated on August 19, 1985.

In 1899 the property Dufvebol, then in Spånga municipality, was sold to a suburb development company, which split the land and built roads, naming it Dufbo egna-hems-koloni (Duvbo own home community). After 5 years the suburb was nearly complete, housing 1200 residents. From 1900 trains stopped at the nearby (400m) station Sundbyberg Norra (named so because it was in the north-west of the adjacent suburb Sundbyberg) was opened, until 1963. In 1902 Duvbo became a municipalsamhälle (submunicipality), until 1949 when it transferred into Sundbyberg municipality. An epidemics hospital was built in 1925 on the Ekbacken slope on the south side of Duvbo, and was torn down in the 1960s, replaced by the hospital Sundbybergs sjukhus. Today Ekbacken is instead an elderly care home, next to a few tall residential buildings.
