= Rinkeby metro station =

Stockholm Metro station

Rinkeby
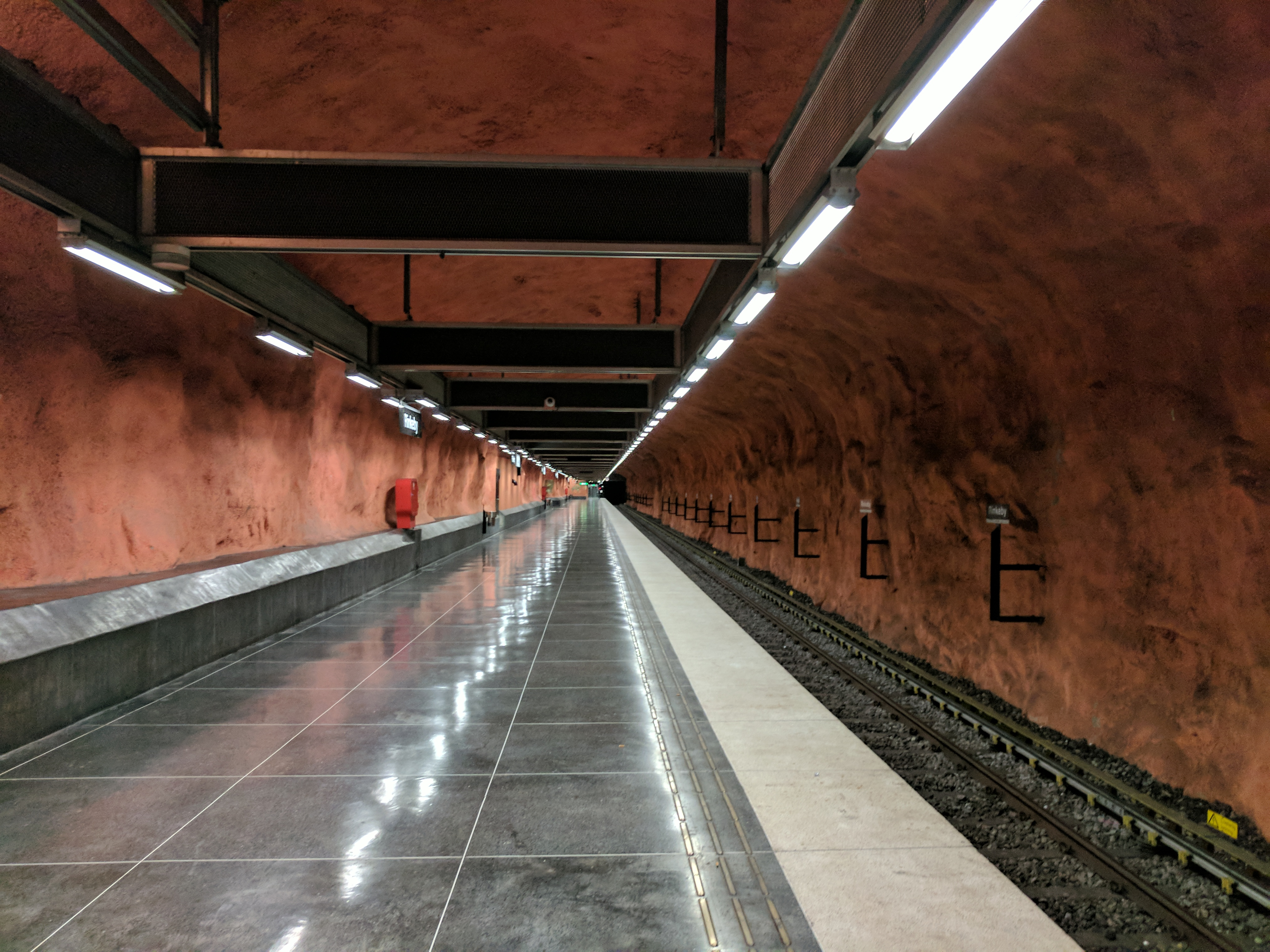

General information
- Location: Rinkeby
- Coordinates: 59°23′17″N 17°55′43″E
- Elevation: 1.2 m (3.9 ft) above sea level
- System: Stockholm Metro station
- Owner: Storstockholms Lokaltrafik
- Tracks: 2

Construction
- Structure type: Underground
- Depth: 29 m (95 ft) below ground
- Accessible: Yes

Other information
- Station code: RIB

History
- Opened: 31 August 1975; 51 years ago

Passengers
- 2019: 6,250 boarding per weekday

Services
Preceding station	Stockholm Metro	Following station
Rissne towards Kungsträdgården	Line 10	Tensta towards Hjulsta
Location
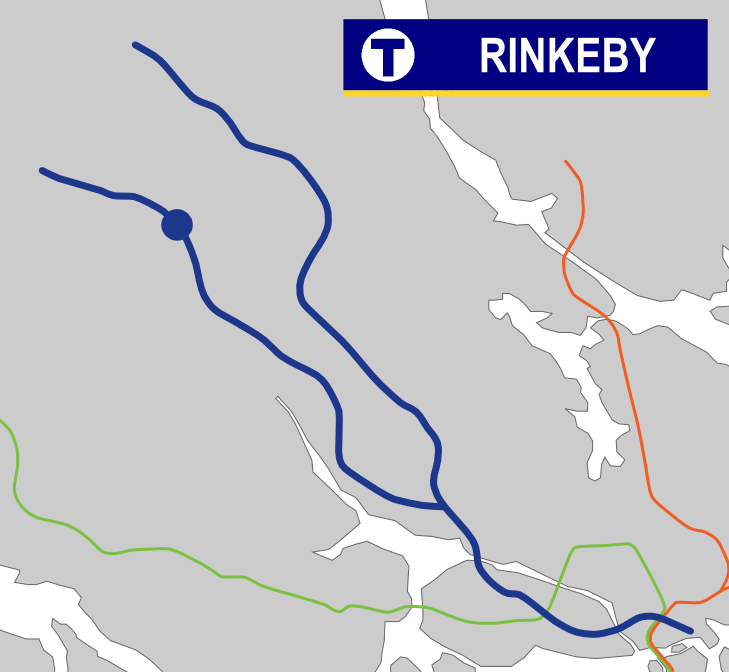

Rinkeby metro station is a station on the Blue Line of the Stockholm Metro, located in the district of Rinkeby. The station was opened on 31 August 1975 as part the first stretch of the Blue Line between T-Centralen and Hjulsta. The trains were running to Hallonbergen and then to Rinkeby via a track which is currently used for the rail yard access. The distance to Kungsträdgården is 12.3 km (7.6 mi).

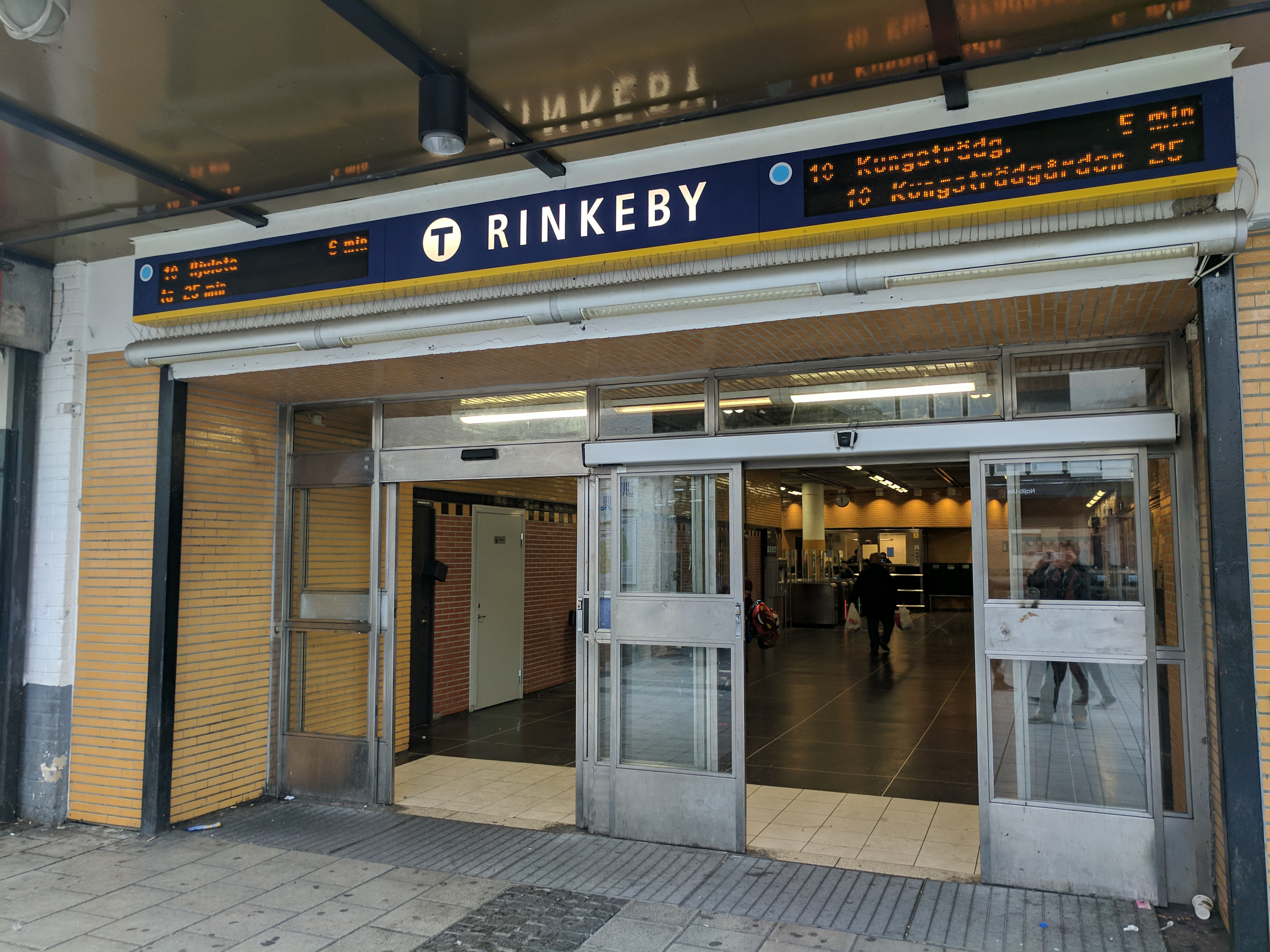
Station entrance
