= Central Sundbyberg =

Urban district in Sundbyberg municipality, Sweden

Coordinates: 59°21′38.41″N 17°58′18.12″E

Central Sundbyberg (Swedish: Centrala Sundbyberg) is the oldest and longest-established part of Sundbyberg Municipality in Sweden. It is a railway town and one of Stockholm's oldest satellite towns, built around Sundbyberg railway station which opened in 1876. Its proximity to Stockholm City Centre, nostalgic environment and well-connected transport networks has made this part of town an attractive housing area.

Forms of public transport include the Stockholm Metro (Tunnelbanan), Stockholm commuter rail (Pendeltåg) and SL buses. Trams returned to Sundbyberg in 2013 after 54 years of absence when Tvärbanan was expanded from Alvik to Solna. Tracks are laid in one of the main streets with two stops in this area.

On the small streets of Central Sundbyberg, there are boutiques, restaurants, banks and other important services.

== Areas ==
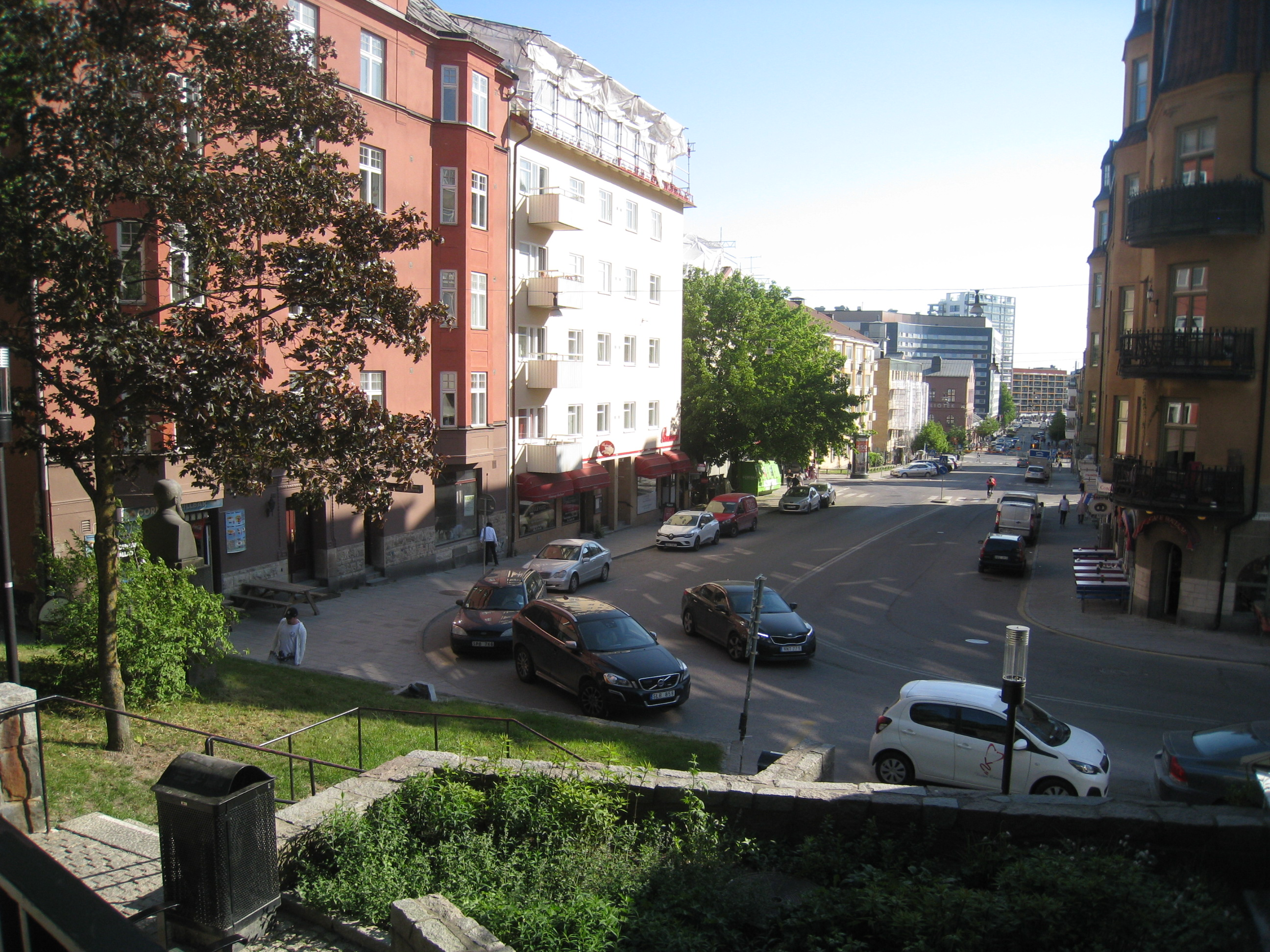
Esplanaden, connecting the shopping streets Järnvägsgatan and Sturegatan with Landsvägen south of the railway, viewed from Tornparken

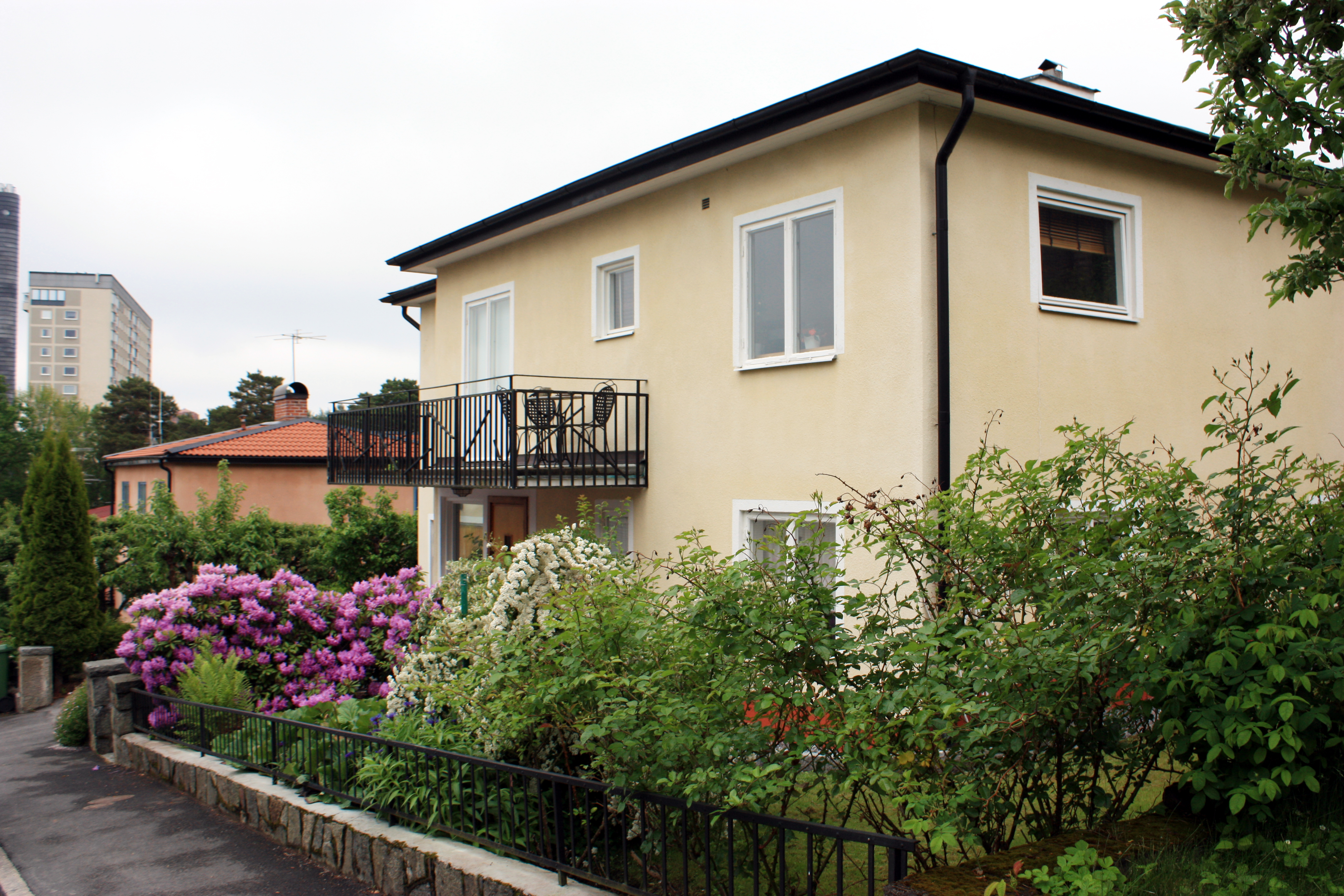
A house in Tulemarken

- Rutnätsstaden ("the grid town"): the area between Tulegatan, Ursviksvägen and the railway. Mostly multiresidential buildings from the 1940s, but the east edge has offices from the 1960s/70s. Sturegatan and Järnvägsgatan are the main shopping streets. Many buildings are from the 1940s. The park Tornparken lies in the middle of the area. Sturegatan and Järnvägsgatan have many shops. Two metro stations, Sundbybergs centrum and Duvbo, are found at opposite ends of the area.
- Allén ("the avenue"): the area south of the railway. The area has many offices in old industrial buildings around Löfgrens allé, as well as the park Marabouparken in the west. There are also multiresidential buildings, mostly from after 1990. Landsvägen, historically the main road between Stockholm and Bromma and then the first front side of Sundbyberg for train arrivals, remains Sundbyberg's most important street. Tvärbanan trams run through Landsvägen.
- Tulemarken ("Thule lands"): the area north of Tulegatan, separated by Vackra vägen from Storskogen. The west side has a mix of sports facilities and tall residential buildings, while the east side has low residential buildings.
- Hästhagen ("the horse paddock"): the area west of Ursviksvägen, separated from Duvbo by Kanalparken ("the canal park"). It has mostly low residential buildings.

== Gallery ==
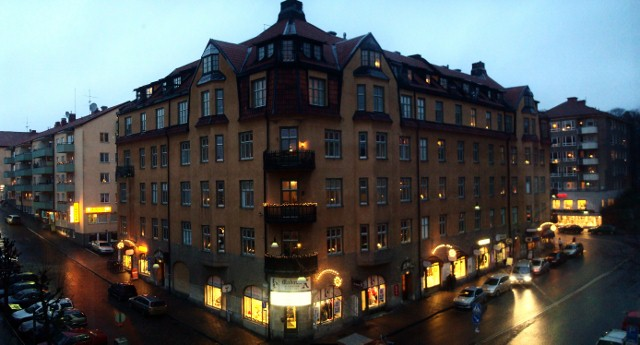
Apartment block from 1911 in Central Sundbyberg (Esplanaden-Sturegatan)

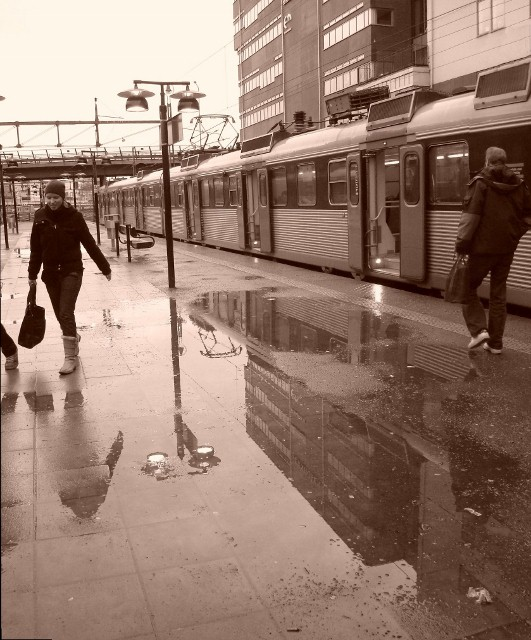
Commuter rail - Sundbyberg station

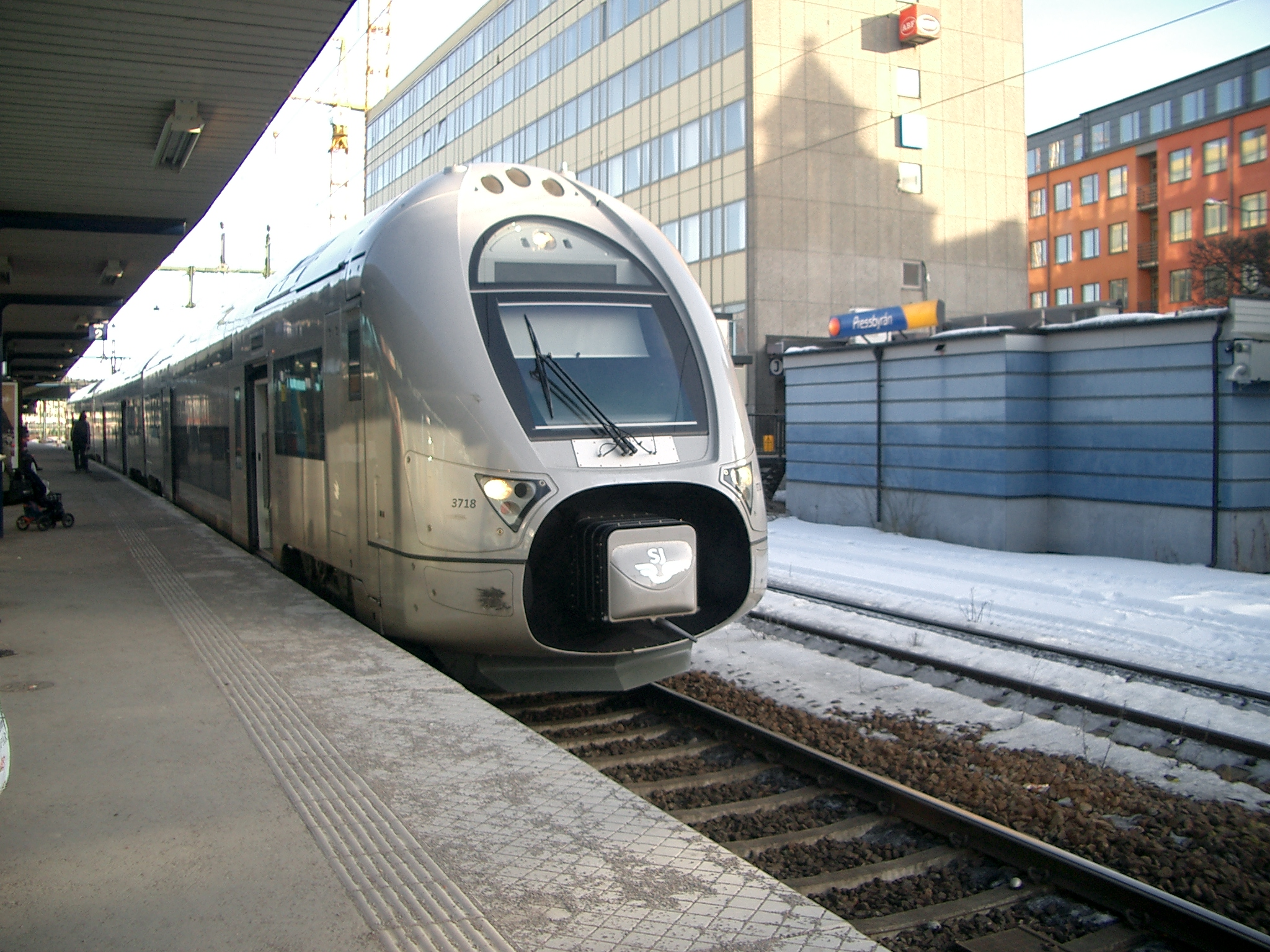

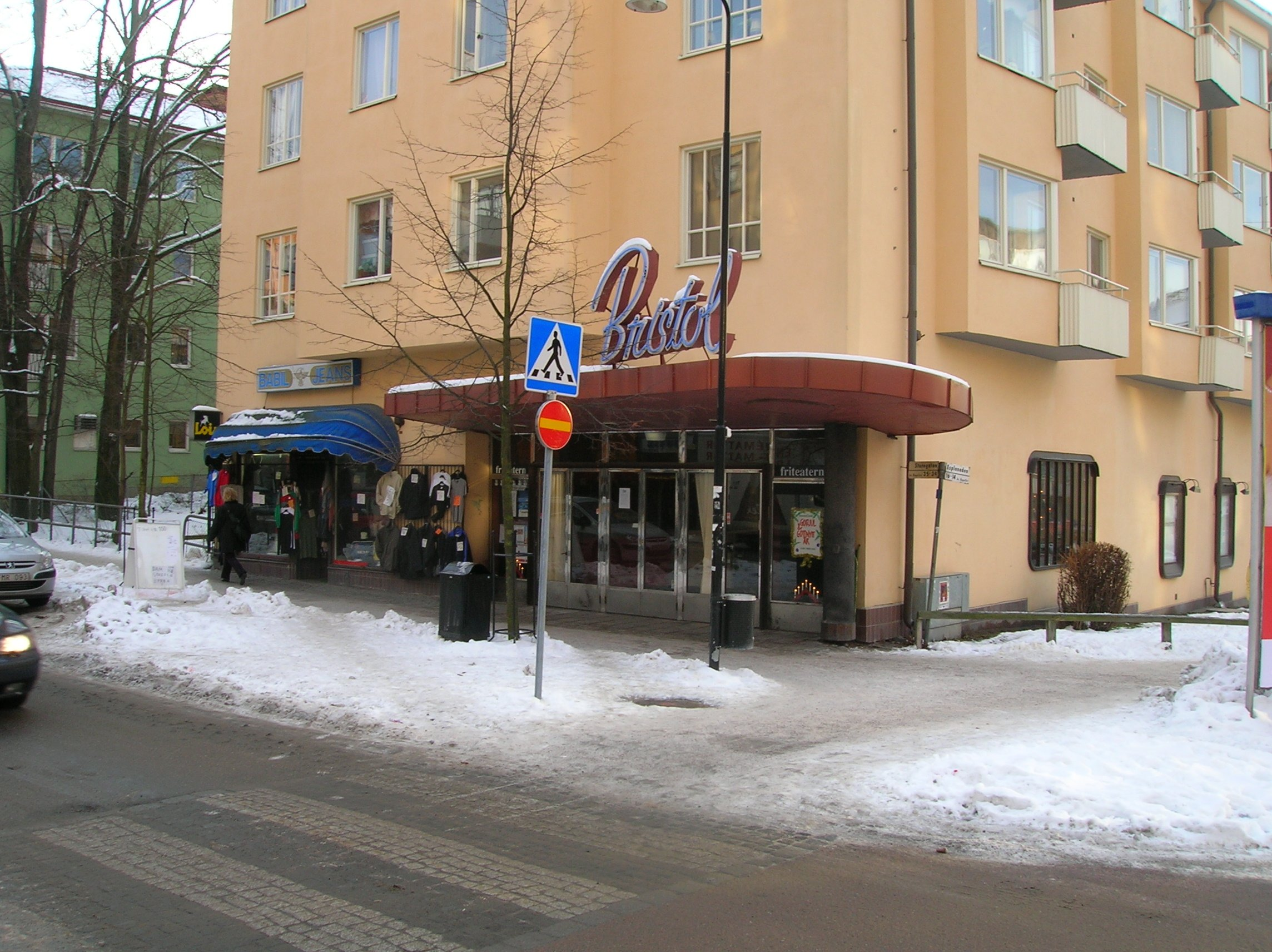

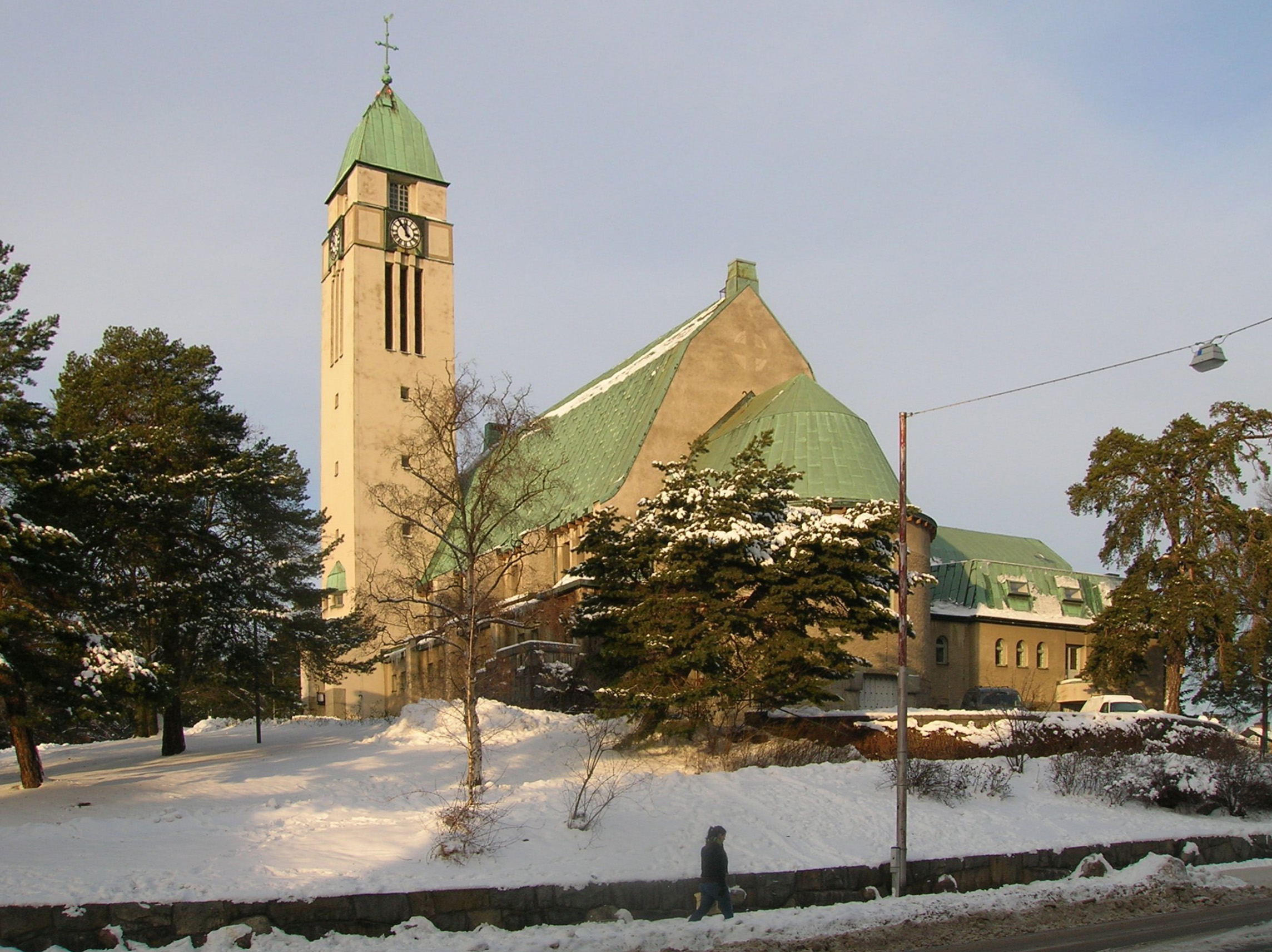
Sundbyberg Church

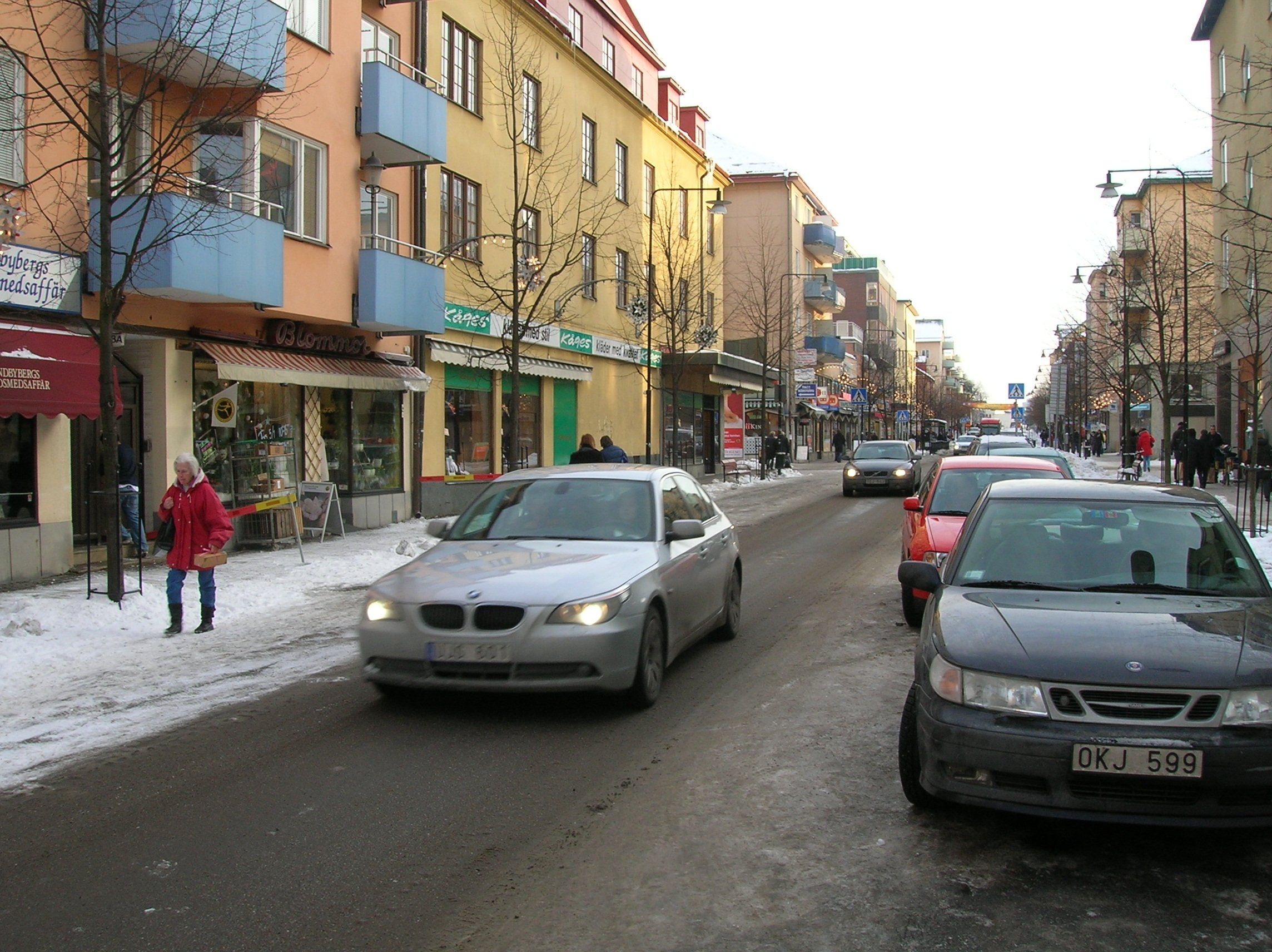
Boutiques on Sturegatan

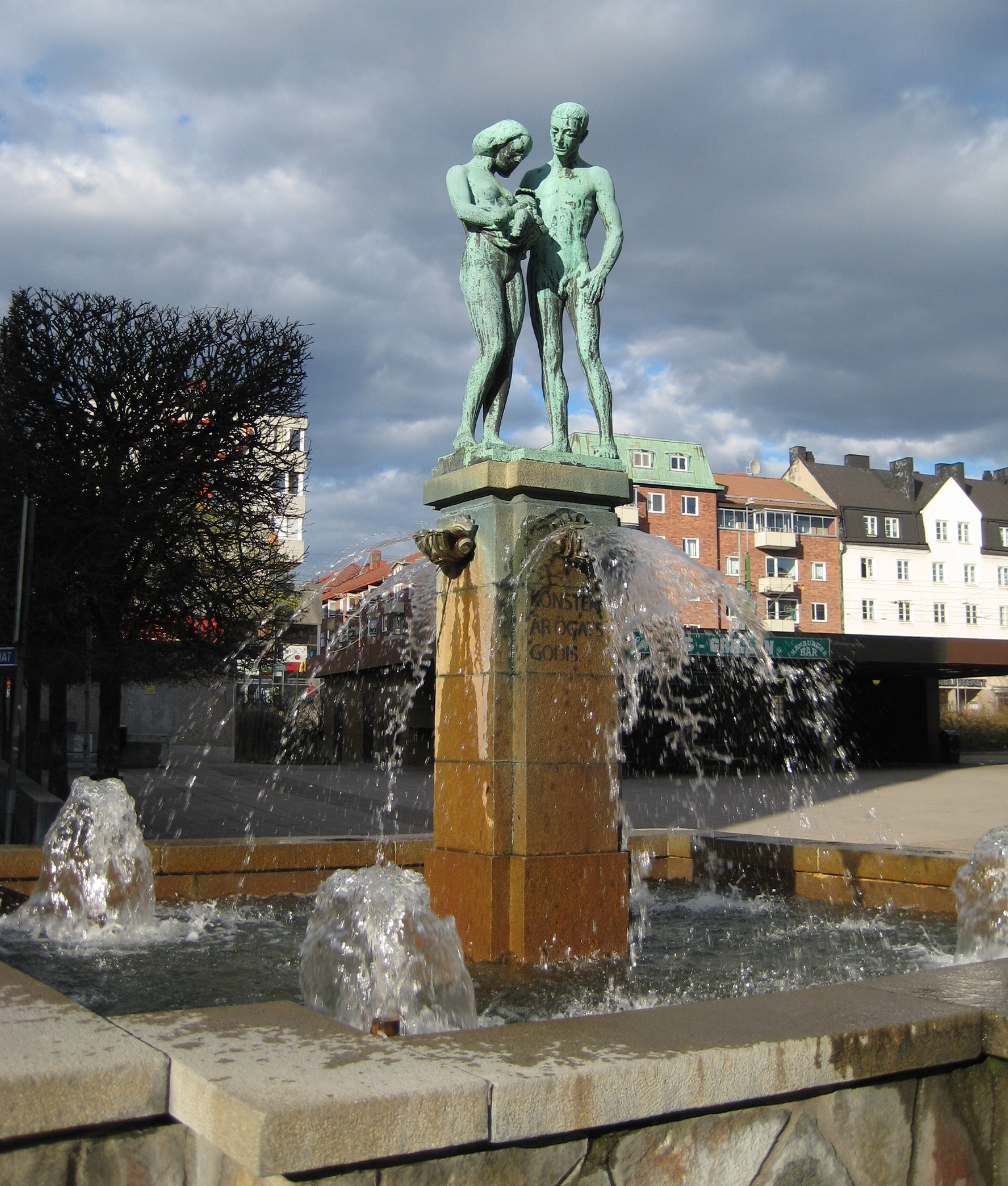
Fountain on Sundbybergs torg in Central Sundbyberg

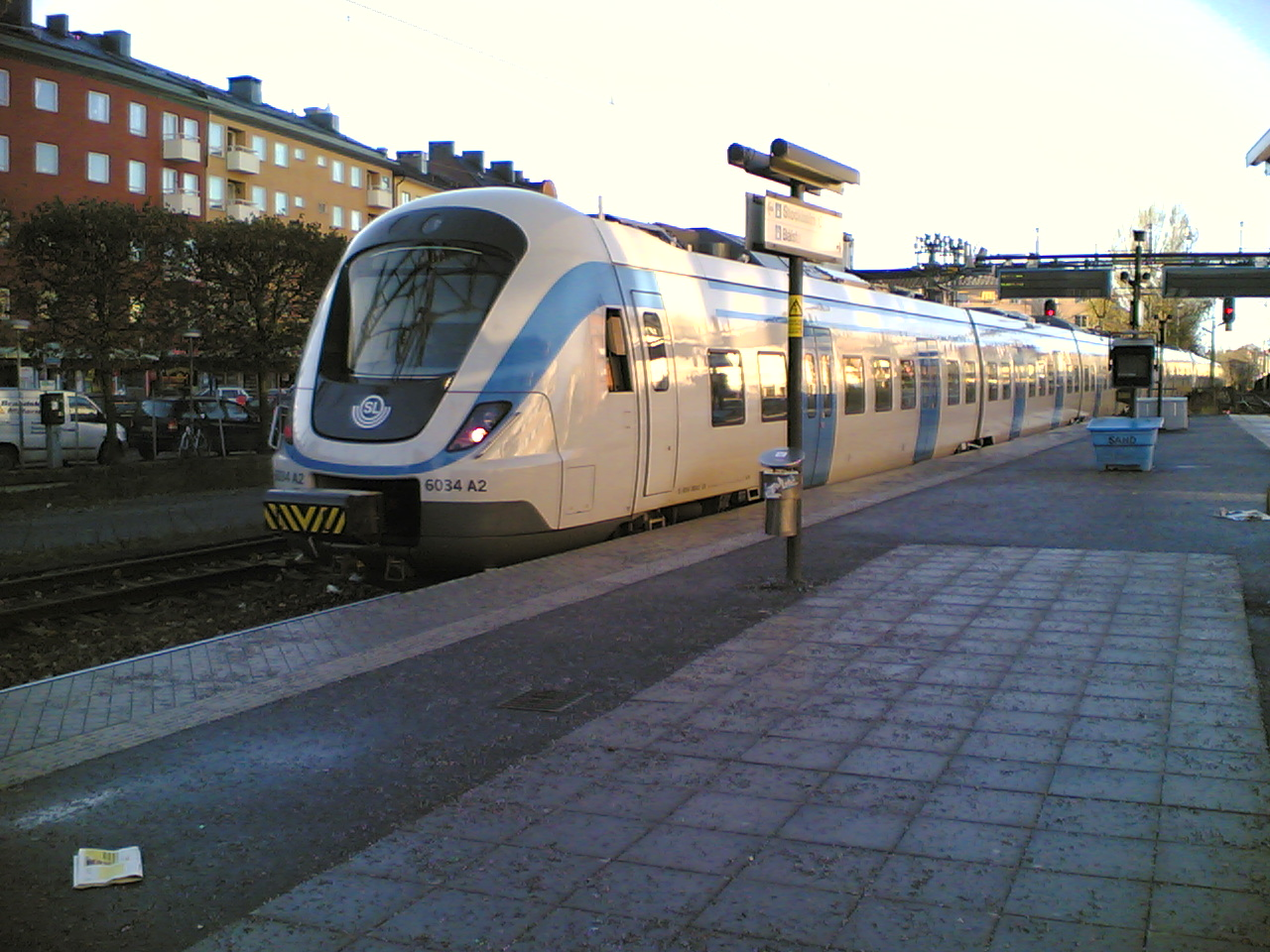
Sundbyberg is served by commuter trains
