= Hjulsta metro station =

Stockholm Metro station

Hjulsta

General information
- Location: Hjulsta
- Coordinates: 59°23′46″N 17°53′16″E
- Elevation: 11.1 m (36 ft) above sea level
- System: Stockholm Metro station
- Owner: Storstockholms Lokaltrafik
- Platforms: 1 island platform
- Tracks: 2

Construction
- Structure type: Underground
- Depth: 20–22 m (66–72 ft)
- Accessible: Yes

Other information
- Station code: HJU

History
- Opened: 31 August 1975; 51 years ago

Passengers
- 2019: 2,250 boarding per weekday

Services
Preceding station	Stockholm Metro	Following station
Tensta towards Kungsträdgården	Line 10	Terminus
Location
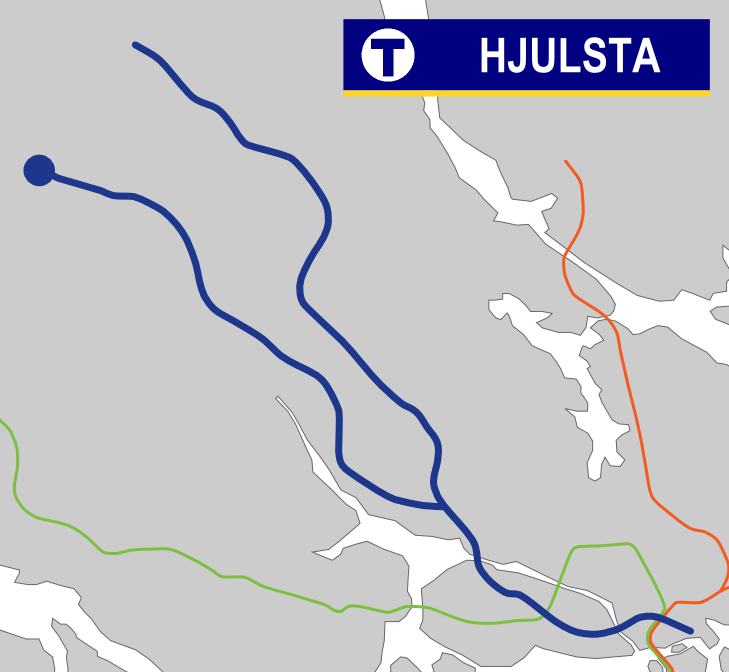

Hjulsta metro station is a station on the Blue Line of the Stockholm Metro, located in Hjulsta, northern Stockholm. The station was opened on 31 August 1975 as the northern terminus of the first stretch of the Blue Line from T-Centralen. The trains were then running via Hallonbergen and Rinkeby.

== Gallery ==
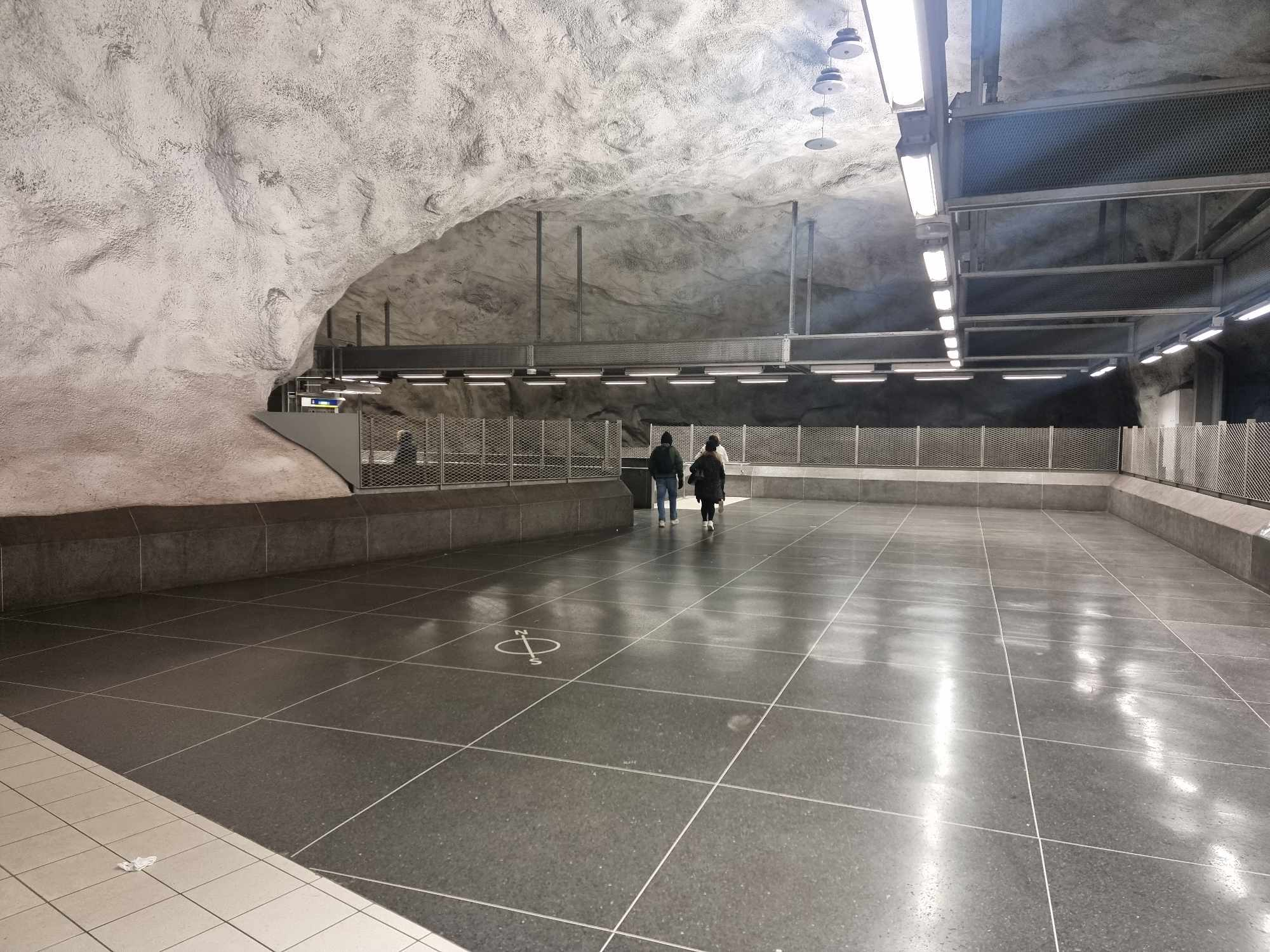
The foundation preceding the metro platform.
