= Kallhäll railway station =

Railway station in Stockholm, Sweden

Kallhäll
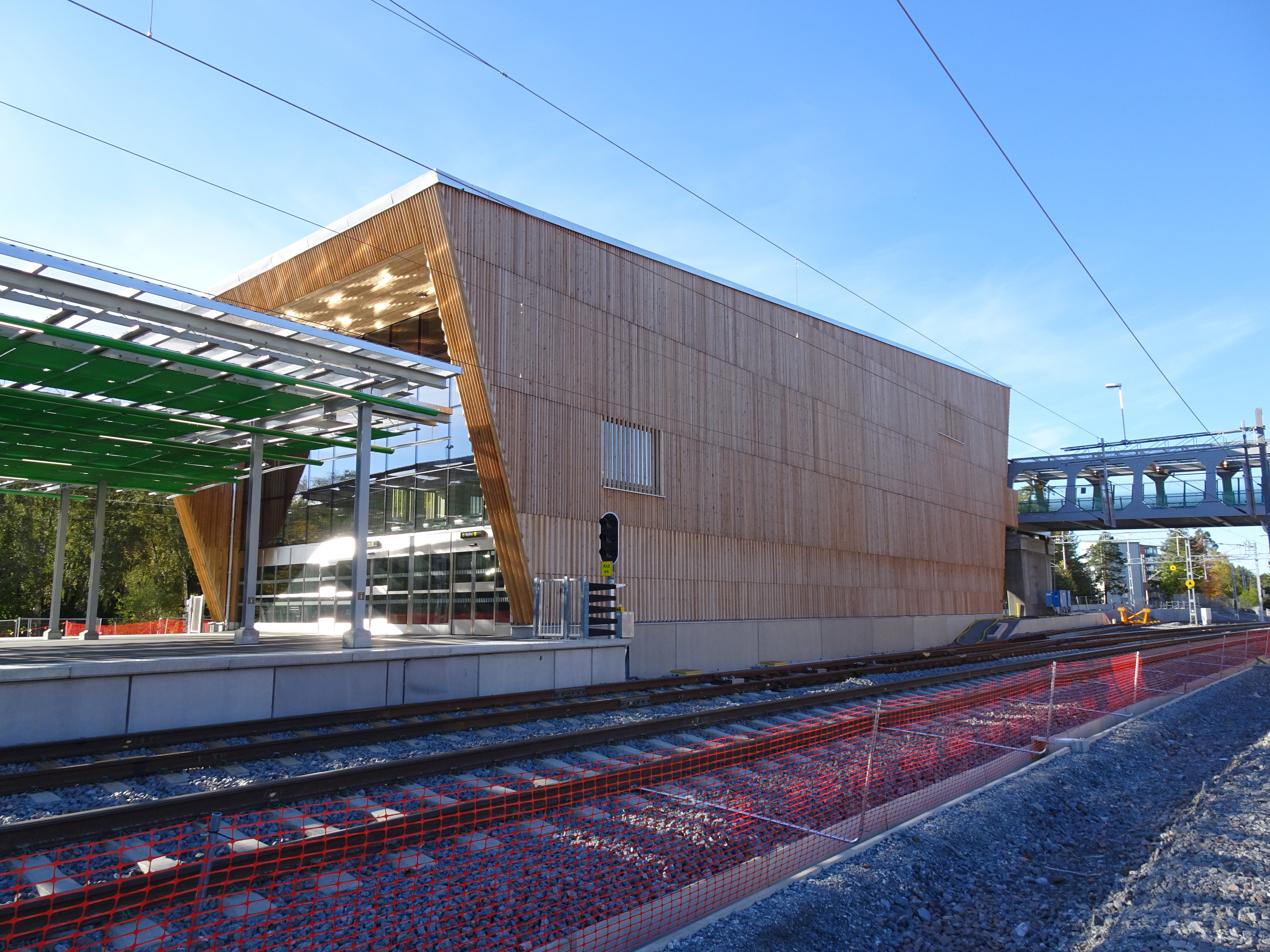
- Kallhäll station building in October 2016

General information
- Location: Kallhäll, Järfälla Municipality, Sweden; Stockholm County
- Coordinates: 59°27′11″N 17°48′22″E
- System: Pendeltåg
- Owner: Swedish Transport Administration
- Platforms: 2
- Tracks: 7
- Connections: Bus terminal

Construction
- Structure type: At-grade

Other information
- Station code: Khä

History
- Opened: 1907
- Rebuilt: 2000, 2016

Passengers
- 2015: 3,900 boarding per weekday (2015) (commuter rail)

Services
Preceding station	Stockholm commuter rail	Following station
Kungsängen towards Bålsta	43	Jakobsberg towards Nynäshamn
Terminus	43X	Jakobsberg towards Nynäshamn
Kungsängen towards Bro	44	Jakobsberg towards Tumba
Location

Kallhäll is a station on the Stockholm commuter rail network, located in the district of Kallhäll-Stäket within Järfälla Municipality. The station is situated on the Mälarbanan railway, 21.2 kilometers from Stockholm City railway station. It is directly connected to Kallhäll's town center, where multiple bus routes operate. On an average weekday, approximately 3,900 passengers board at this station (2015).

After a renovation and expansion project from 2014 to 2016, the station now features two platforms with four tracks dedicated to commuter trains (two for passing trains and two for terminating trains). Additionally, there are two tracks for long-distance and freight trains, as well as a siding track, bringing the total to seven tracks.

== History ==
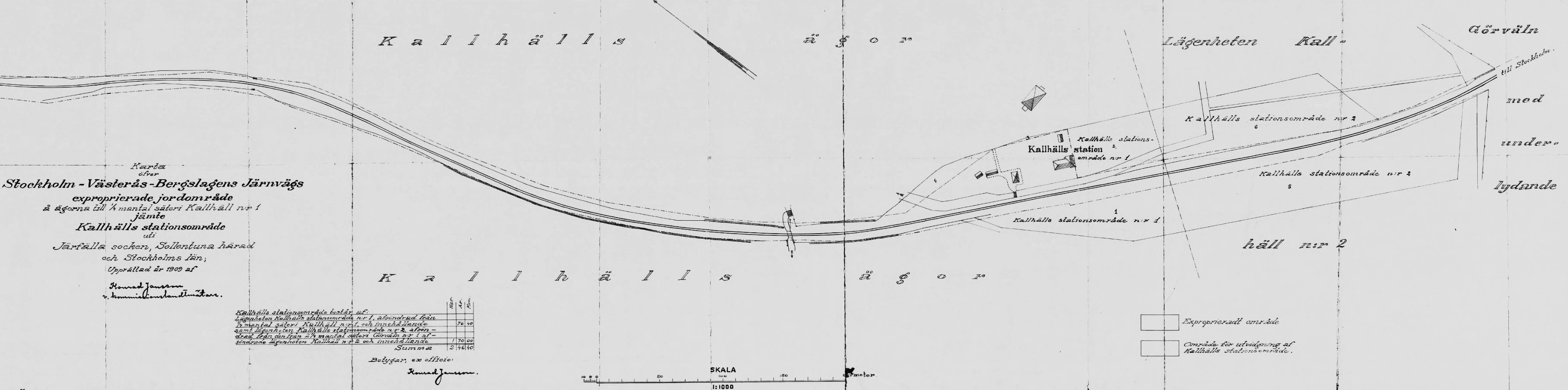
Map of Kallhäll station area in 1909.

The original station opened in 1907 on the former Stockholm–Västerås–Bergslagen Railway to serve the new Bolinders mechanical workshop industrial area and the adjacent residential community. Before this, trains passed through Kallhäll without stopping, with only a track watchman's house present.

In 1964, double tracks were completed from Stockholm Central to Kallhäll. When Storstockholms Lokaltrafik (SL) assumed responsibility for local rail transport in 1967, the station was adapted for commuter rail service. A significant renovation took place between 1999 and 2000 in conjunction with the double-tracking expansion toward Kungsängen. During the summer of 2016, the station was closed for eight weeks for construction, reopening in its new configuration on August 8, 2016.

== Expansion and modernisation ==
The station underwent an expansion to four commuter rail tracks, completed in 2016. In March 2014, Swedish Transport Administration began preparations for the station's reconstruction. On April 22, 2014, the old station building was closed for demolition, with the demolition itself occurring on May 23-24, replaced by a temporary ticket hall in the southern section of the platform. The new station is almost in the same location as the old one.

The station now has a northern entrance accessed via a newly built pedestrian and cycling bridge with a glass roof, connecting Kallhäll's center and bus terminal with a pathway leading toward Görväln Nature Reserve and the residential area of Bolinder Strand. A second pedestrian bridge was also built at the southern end, but currently lacks an entrance, although provisions exist for future development.

== Architecture ==
The architectural design of the new station was done by Rundquist Arkitekter, including the adjacent bus terminal, bridge, platform shelters, and station furniture. The station and bus terminal are clad in Siberian larch wood, both internally and externally. The pedestrian bridge is 40 meters long and weighs 129 tons, pre-fabricated in sections and lifted into place.

== Gallery ==
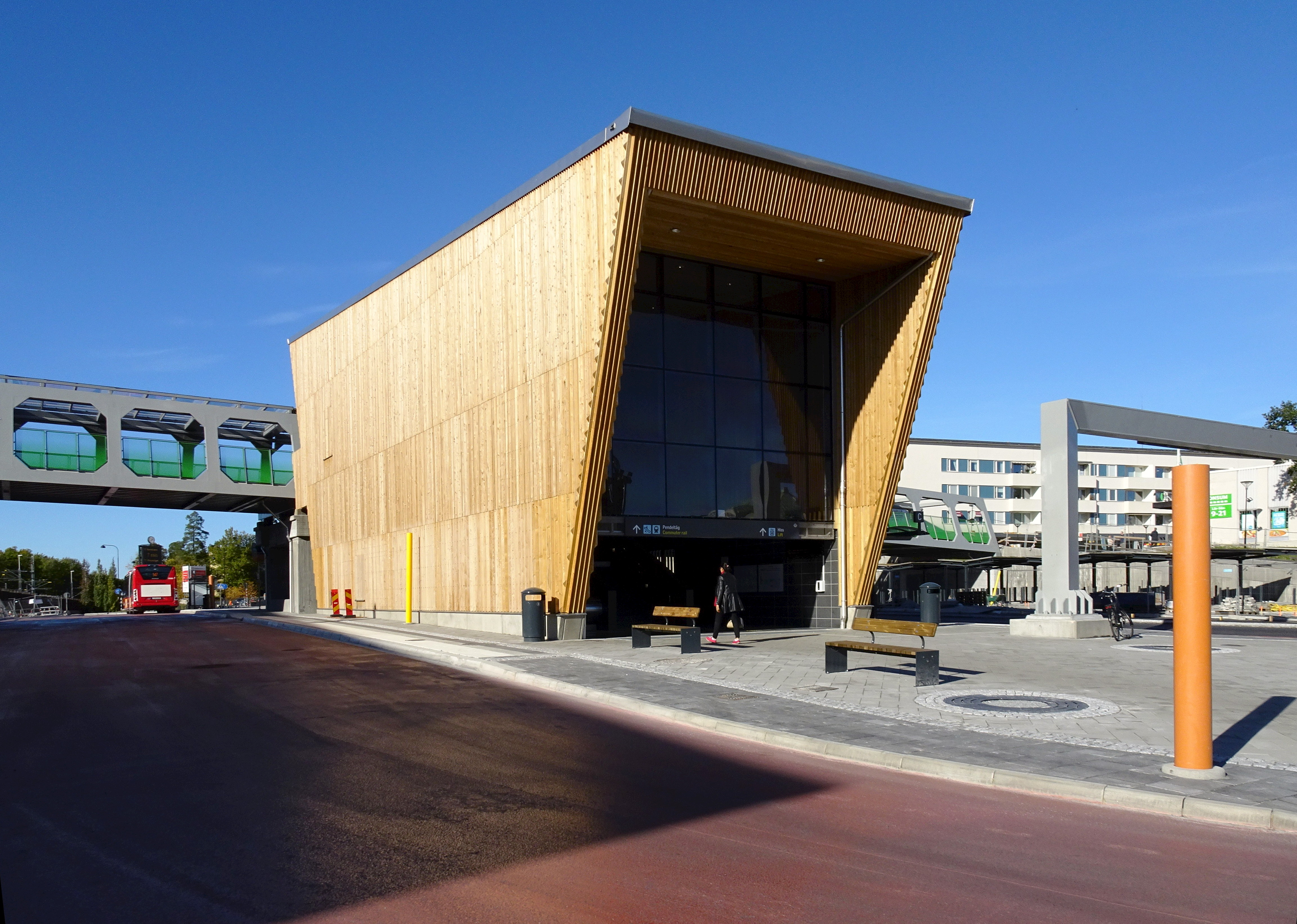
Entrance to the pedestrian bridge

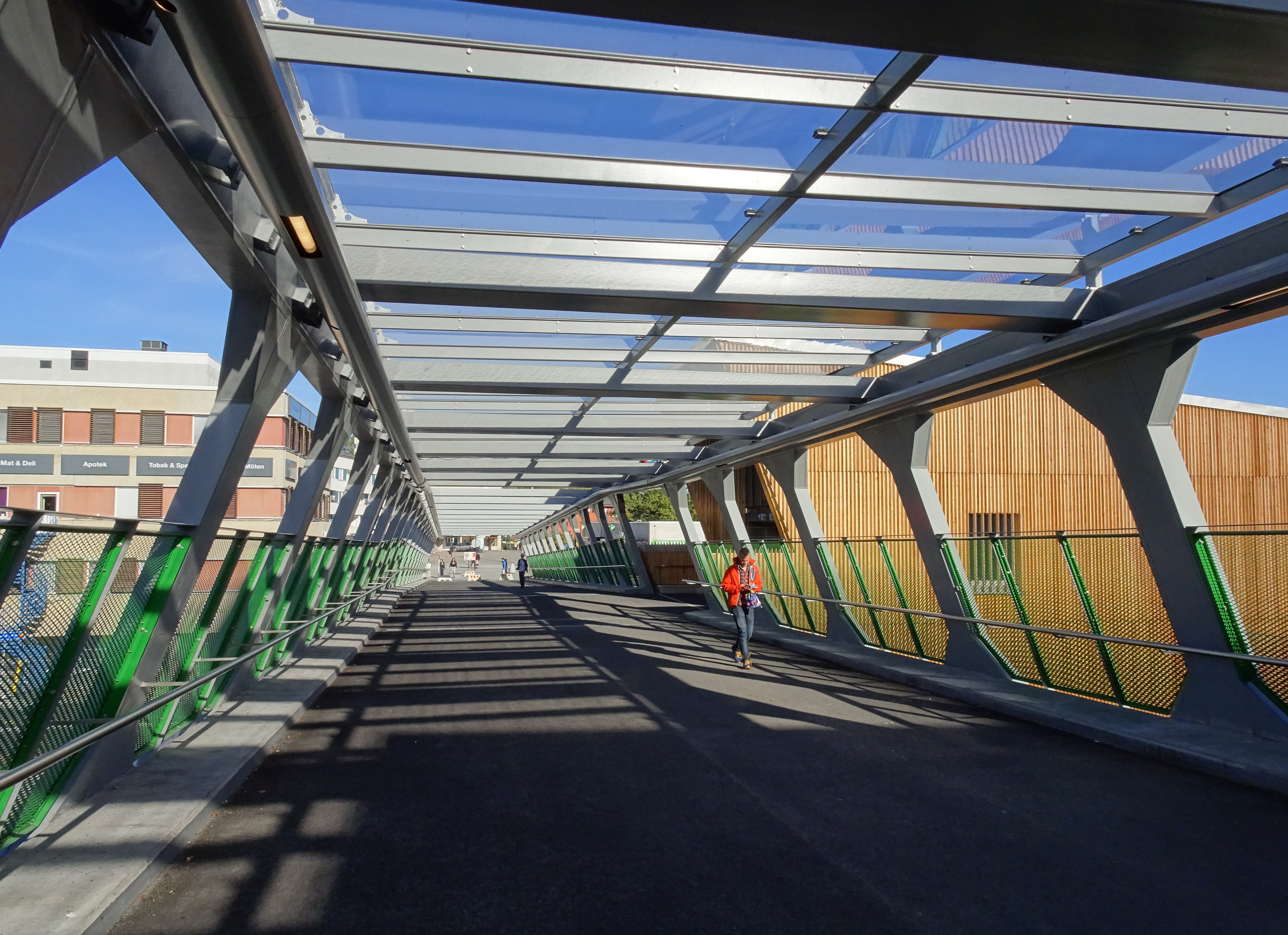
The pedestrian bridge

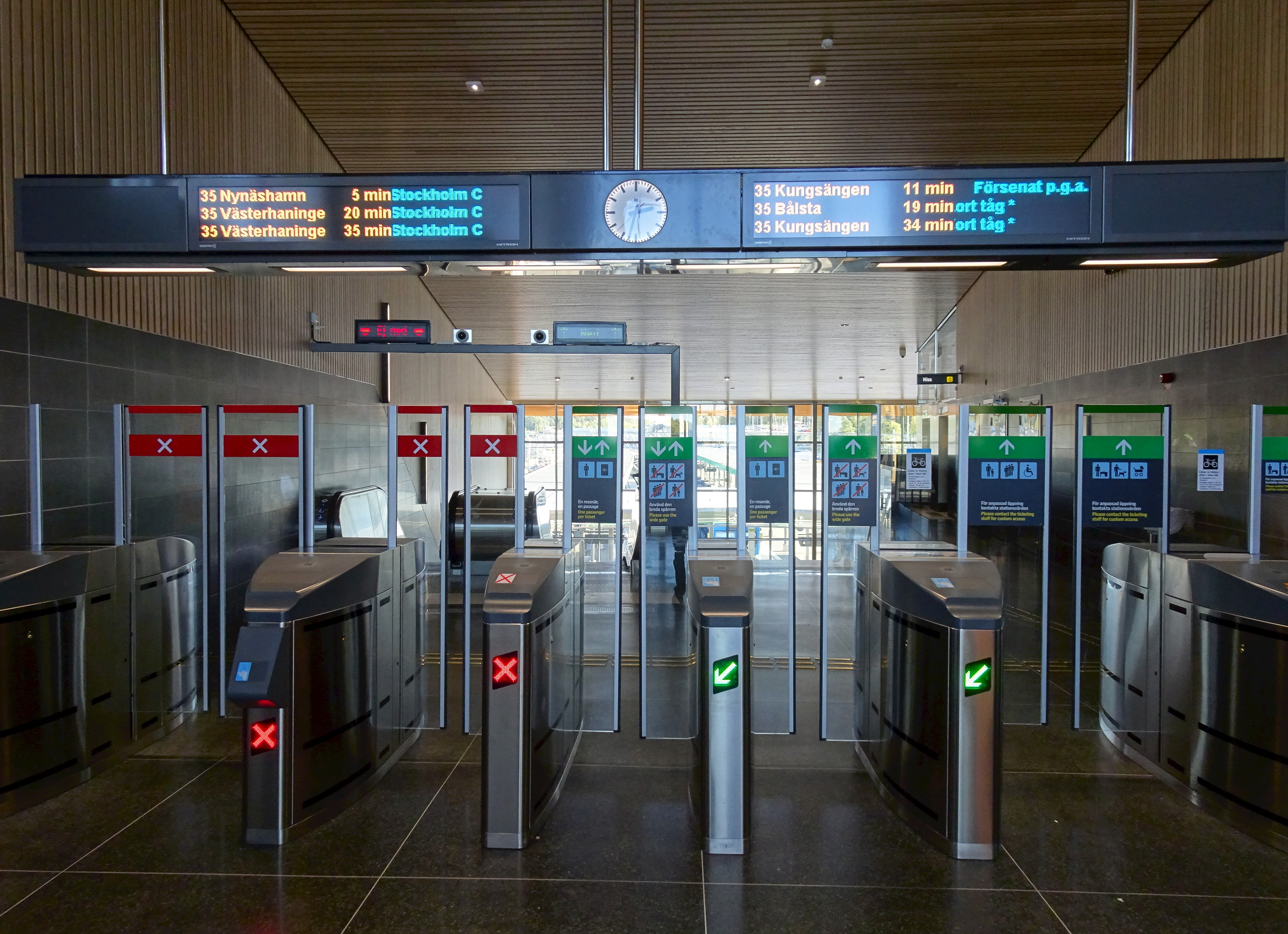
Ticket gates
