= Kungsängen railway station =

Railway station in Stockholm, Sweden

Kungsängen
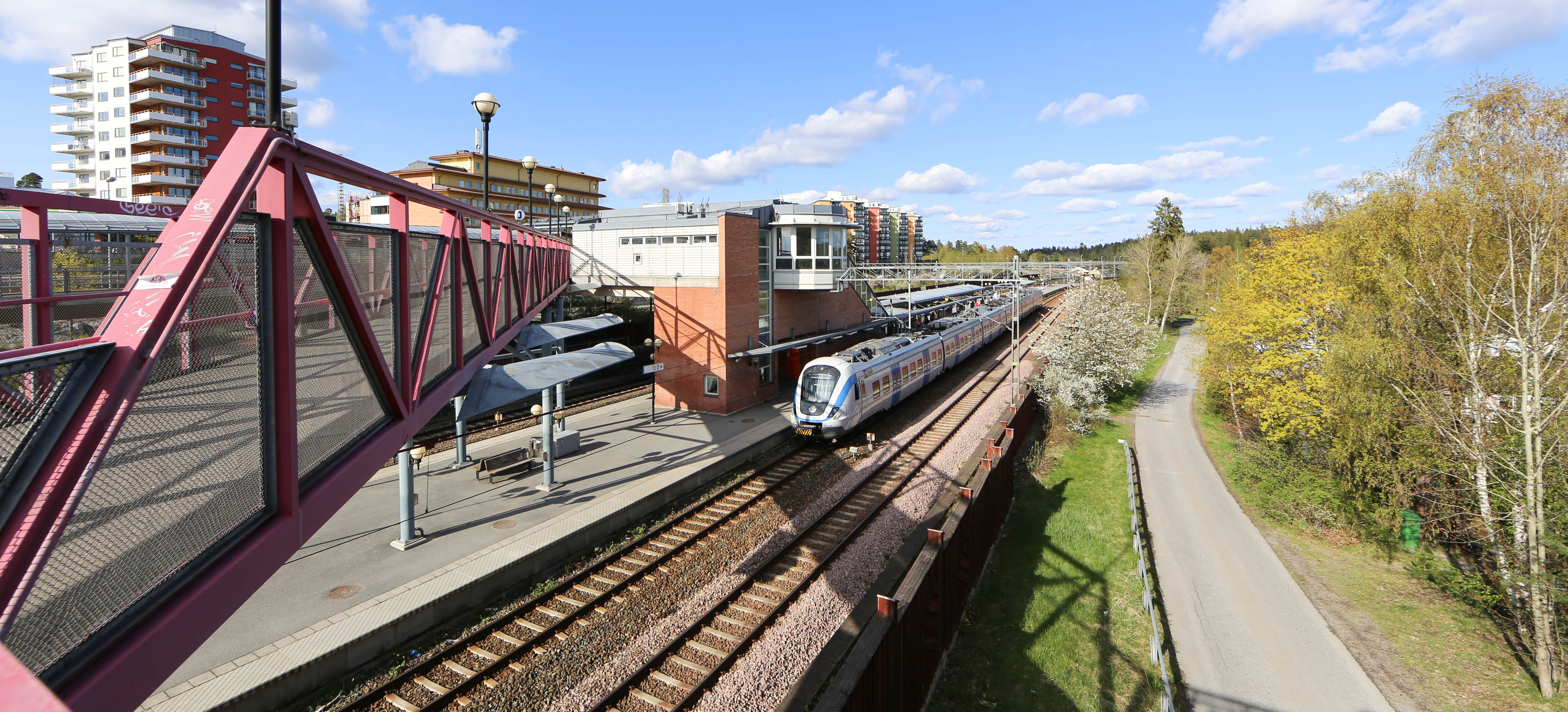
- Kungsängen station building

General information
- Location: Kungsängen, Upplands-Bro Municipality, Sweden; Stockholm County
- Coordinates: 59°28′40″N 17°45′9″E
- System: Pendeltåg
- Owner: Swedish Transport Administration
- Platforms: 1
- Tracks: 2
- Connections: Bus terminal

Construction
- Structure type: At-grade

Other information
- Station code: Kän

History
- Opened: 1876
- Rebuilt: 2000

Passengers
- 2015: 4,500 boarding per weekday (2015) (commuter rail)

Services
Preceding station	Stockholm commuter rail	Following station
Bro towards Bålsta	43	Kallhäll towards Nynäshamn
Bro Terminus	44	Kallhäll towards Tumba
Location

Kungsängen is a station on the Stockholm commuter rail network, located in the locality of Kungsängen within Upplands-Bro Municipality. It is situated on the Mälarbanan railway, 26.2 kilometers from Stockholm City railway station. The station is directly connected to Kungsängen's town center, where multiple bus routes operate. On an average weekday, approximately 4,500 passengers board at this station (2015).

== History ==
The original station opened in 1876 as a passing loop on the then single-track Stockholm–Västerås–Bergslagen Railway. The locality of Kungsängen began to grow around the station at the turn of the 20th century. In 1967, responsibility for local railway transport within Stockholm County was transferred to Storstockholms Lokaltrafik (SL). That same year, a decision was made to move Upplands-Bro Municipality from Uppsala County to Stockholm County, a change that took effect in 1971. On April 22, 1968, Kungsängen became the terminus for the Stockholm commuter rail service, featuring a single platform and a ticket hall.

On April 25, 2000, a newly built station facility was inaugurated along with a straighter double-track route. Kungsängen ceased to be a terminus, as the commuter train service was extended to Bålsta. However, many commuter trains from Stockholm still terminate at Kungsängen, as the Stockholm-Kungsängen route operates at 15-minute intervals, while trains to Bålsta run every 30 minutes.

== Gallery ==
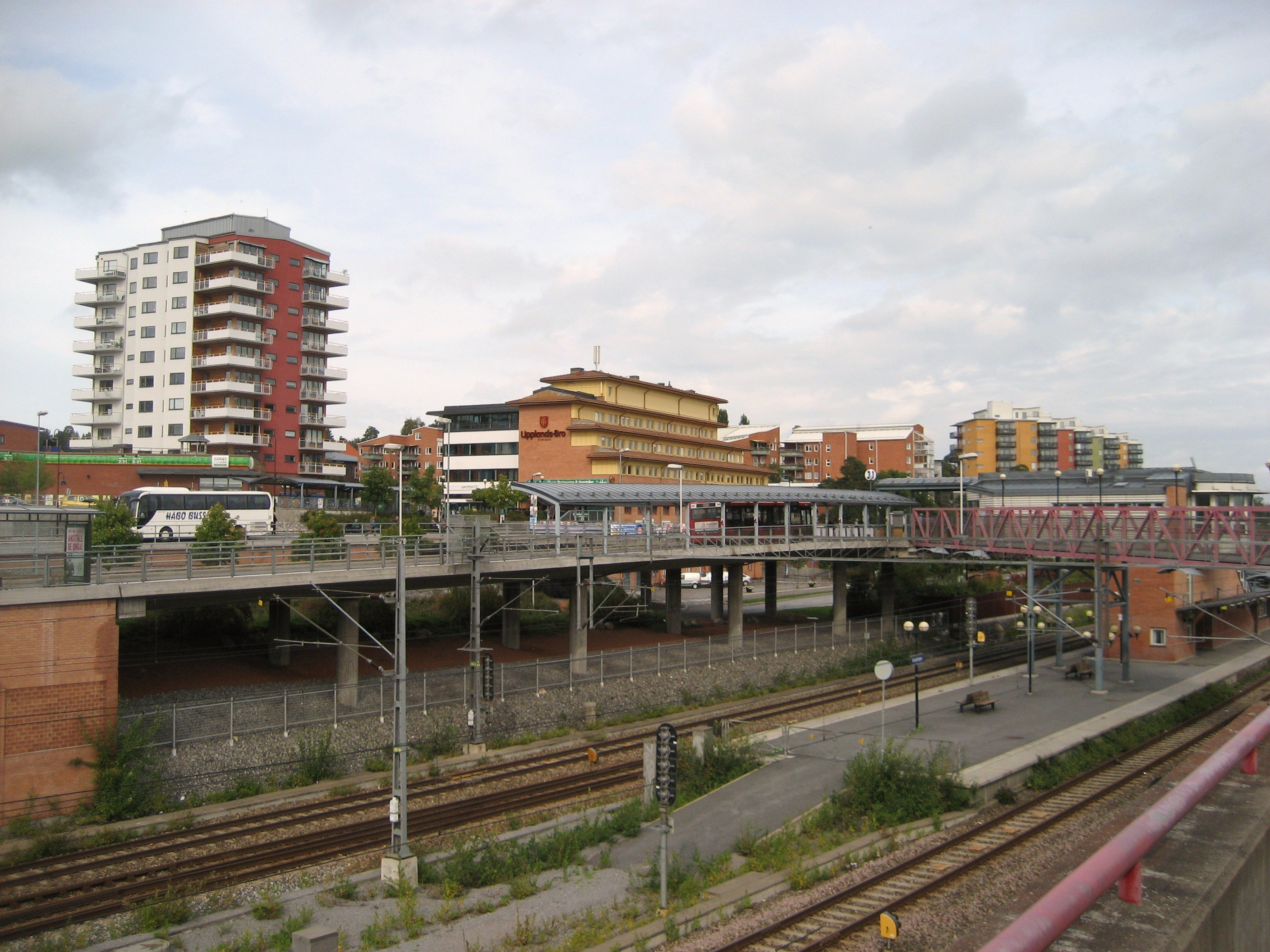

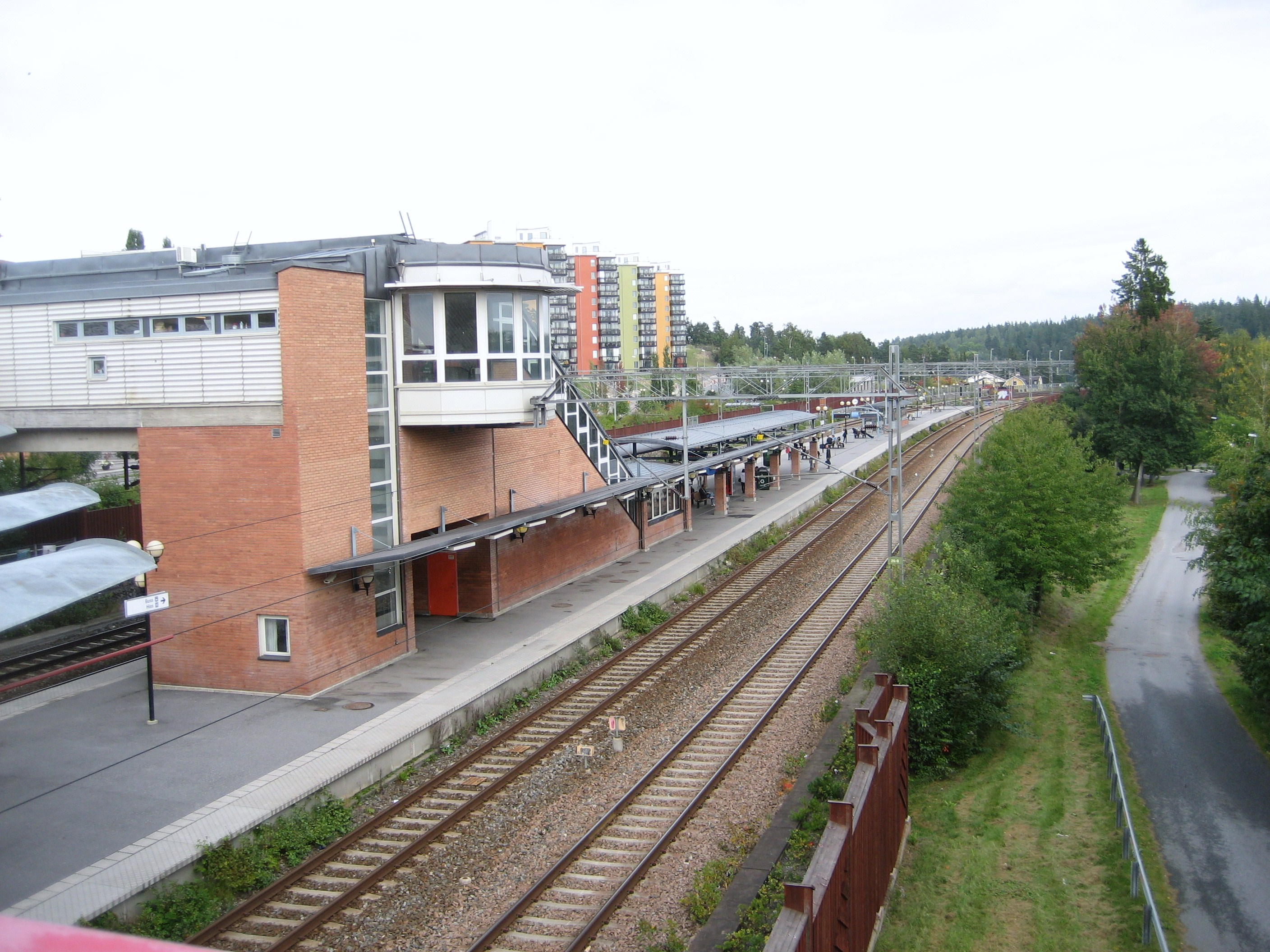

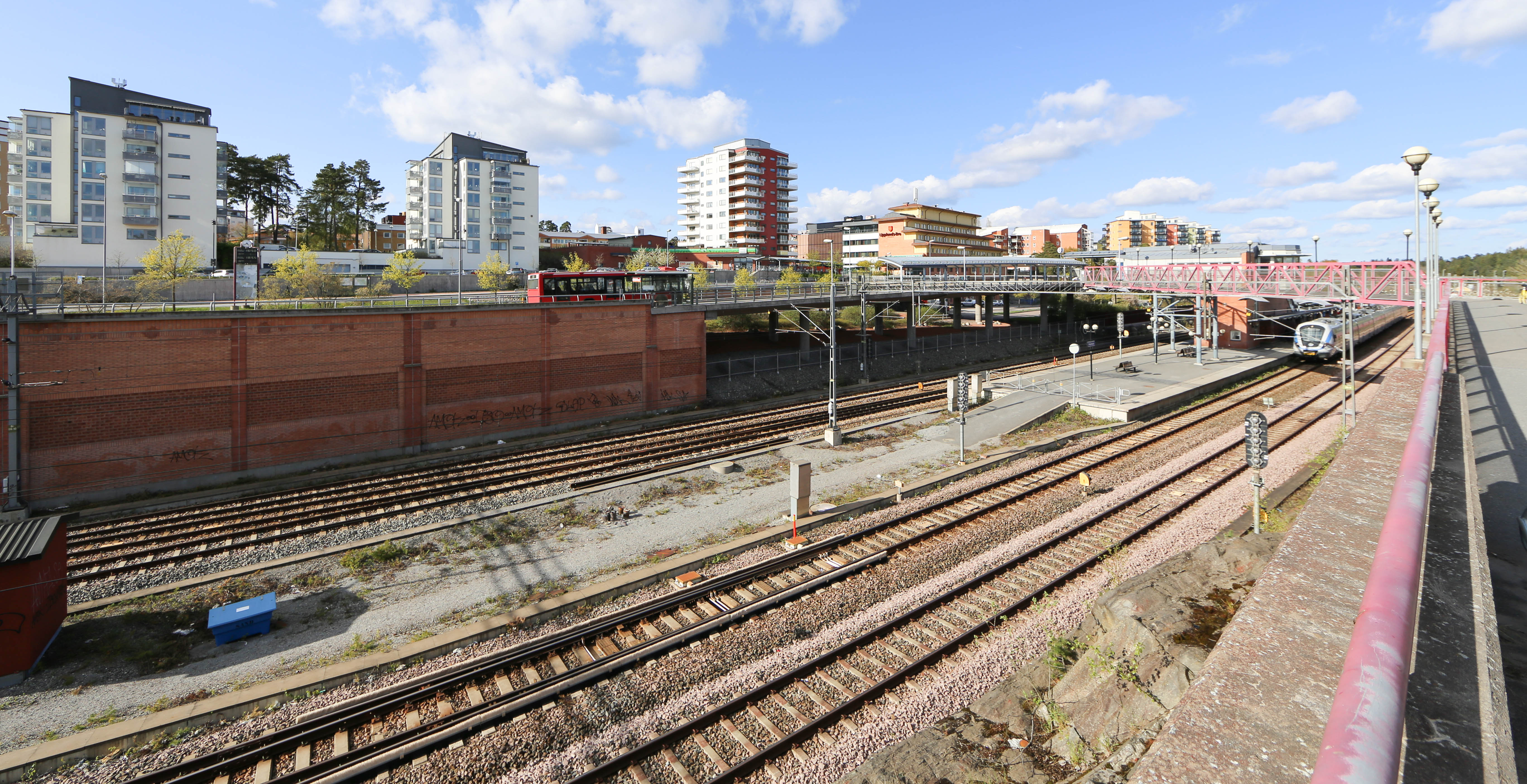

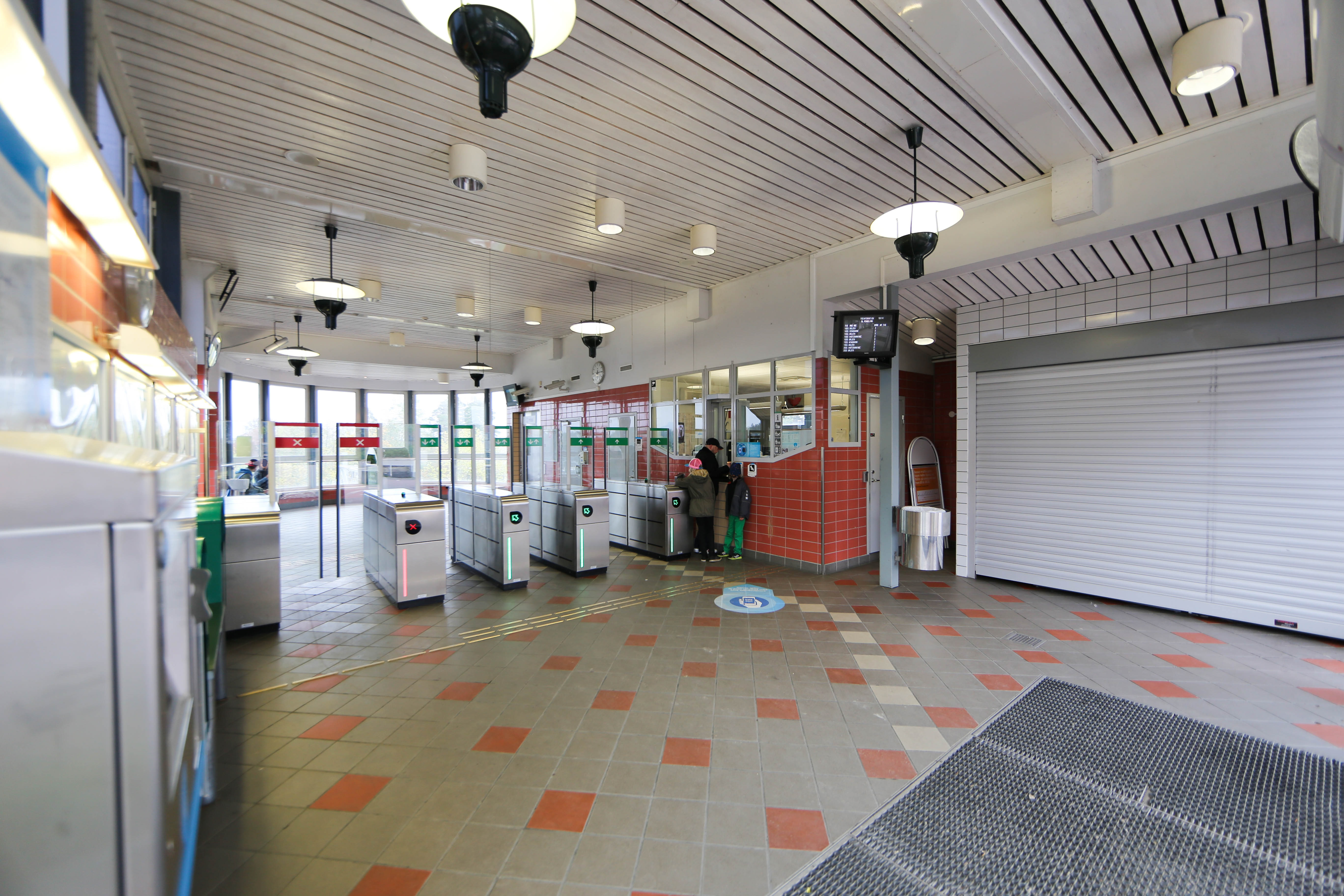
Ticket hall
