= Krägga =

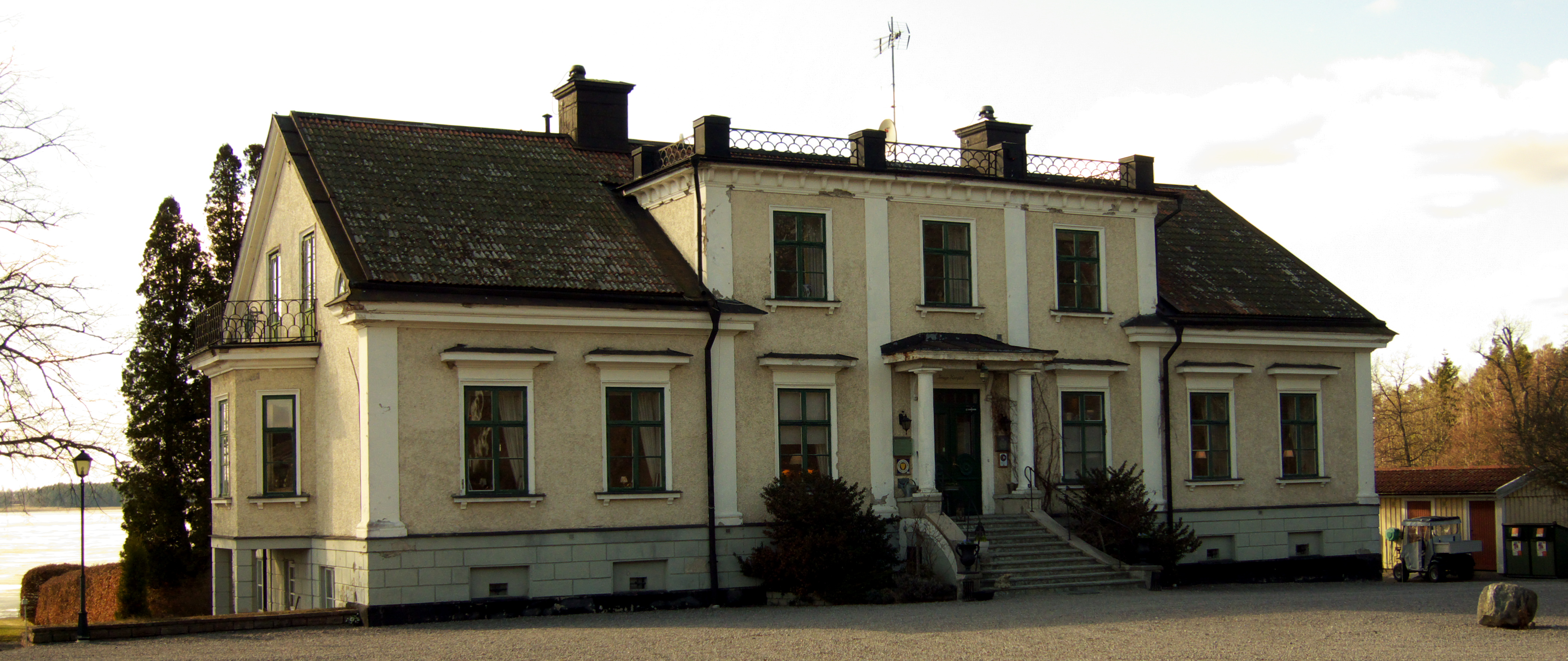
- Krägga manor

- Location within Uppsala Location within Sweden
- Coordinates: 59°36′N 17°24′E
- Country: Sweden
- Province: Uppland
- County: Uppsala County
- Municipality: Håbo Municipality

Area
  - Total: 0.66 km^{2} (0.25 sq mi)

Population (31 December 2020)
  - Total: 628
  - Density: 950/km^{2} (2,500/sq mi)
- Time zone: UTC+1 (CET)
  - Summer (DST): UTC+2 (CEST)

Krägga is a locality situated in Håbo Municipality, Uppsala County, Sweden with 331 inhabitants in 2010.
