= Bro railway station =

Railway station in Upplands-Bro, Sweden

Bro
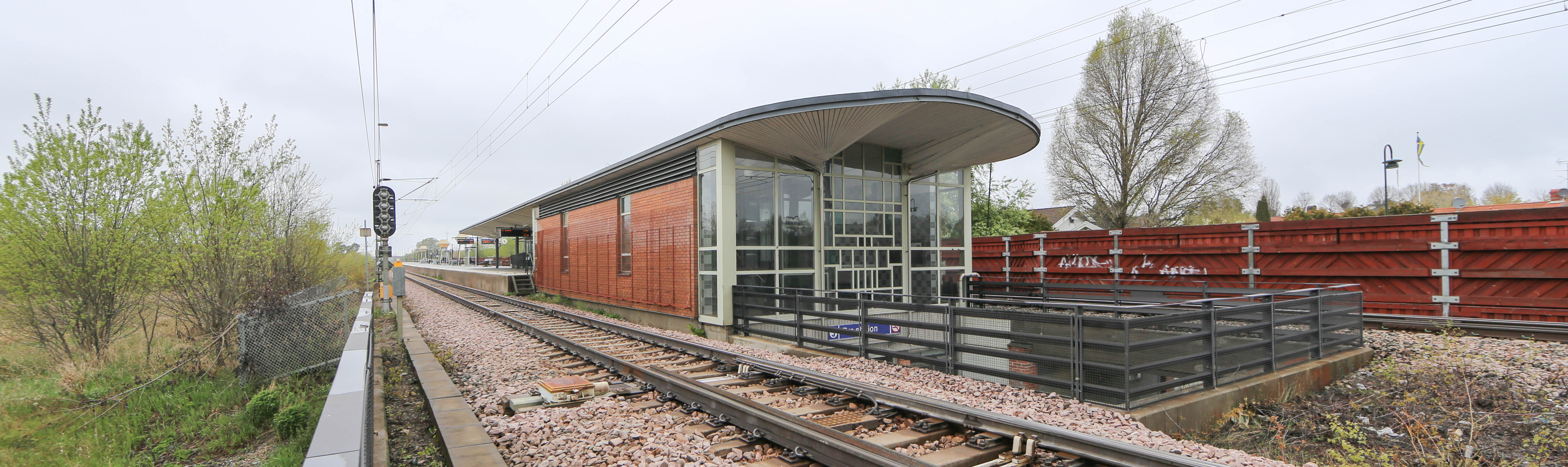
- Bro station building

General information
- Location: Bro, Upplands-Bro Municipality, Sweden; Sweden
- Coordinates: 59°31′12″N 17°37′48″E
- System: Pendeltåg
- Owner: Trafikverket
- Operator: Storstockholms Lokaltrafik
- Line: Mälarbanan
- Platforms: 1 (island platform)
- Tracks: 2
- Connections: Bus terminal

Construction
- Structure type: At-grade
- Accessible: yes

Other information
- Station code: Bro

History
- Opened: 1876
- Closed: 1972
- Rebuilt: 2001

Passengers
- 2,000 daily

Services
Preceding station	Stockholm commuter rail	Following station
Bålsta Terminus	43	Kungsängen towards Nynäshamn
Terminus	44	Kungsängen towards Tumba
Location

Bro is a station on the Stockholm commuter rail network, located in the locality of Bro in Upplands-Bro Municipality. The station is on the Mälarbanan line, approximately 36.4 km from Stockholm City railway station. The station features two tracks and a central island platform. The ticket hall is situated on the platform’s southern end and is accessed via an underground pedestrian tunnel. Around 2,000 passengers board at this station on weekdays.

== History ==
=== Former station ===
The former Stockholm–Västerås–Bergslagen Railway opened a station on the then single-track railway when it was inaugurated in 1876. The station was located 35.9 km from Stockholm Central Station. The old station building still exists.

On 1 January 1967, responsibility for local rail transport within Stockholm County was transferred to Storstockholms Lokaltrafik (SL). It was also decided that Upplands-Bro Municipality would be transferred from Uppsala County to Stockholm County (which took effect on 1 January 1971). Commuter rail services were terminated at Kungsängen, and passenger service to the old Bro station ceased in the summer of 1972.

=== New station ===
During the reconstruction of the old Västerås Line into the present-day Mälarbanan, capacity on the line was expanded, including the addition of double tracks. A decision was made to extend commuter rail services to Bålsta, which was implemented in 2001. At the same time, the new Bro station was opened.

== Gallery ==
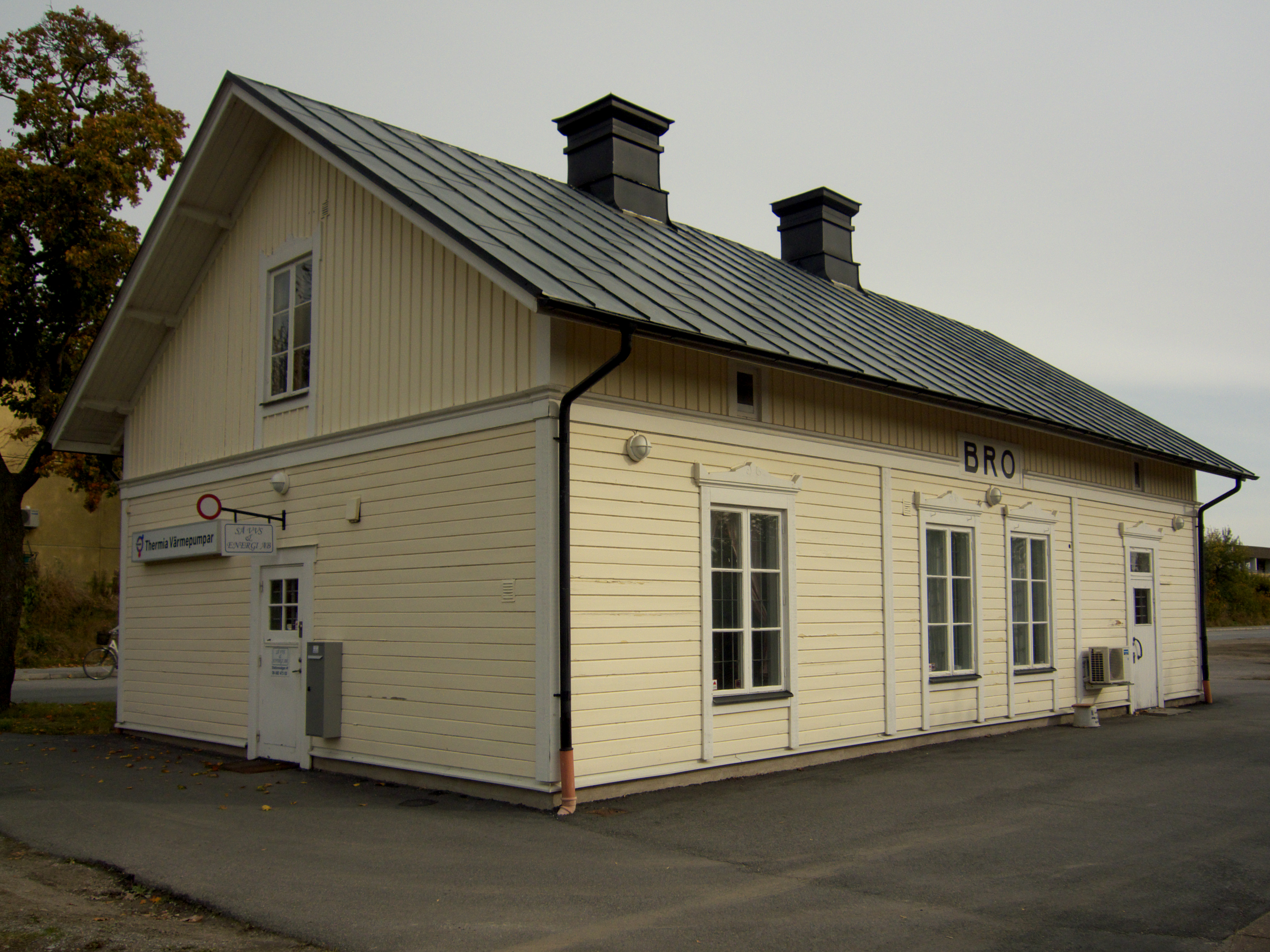
The old station building, in operation from 1876 to 1972.

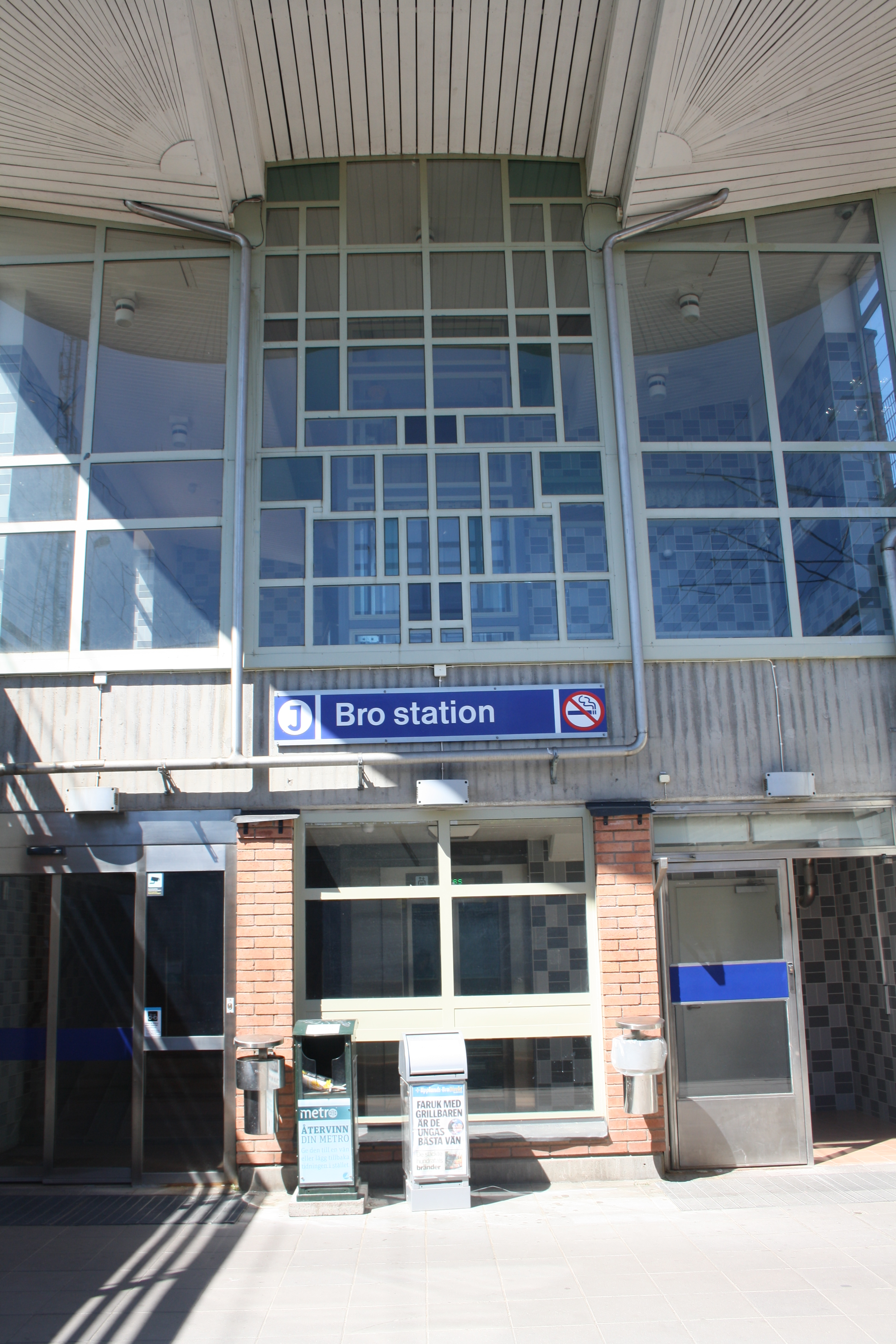
Entrance

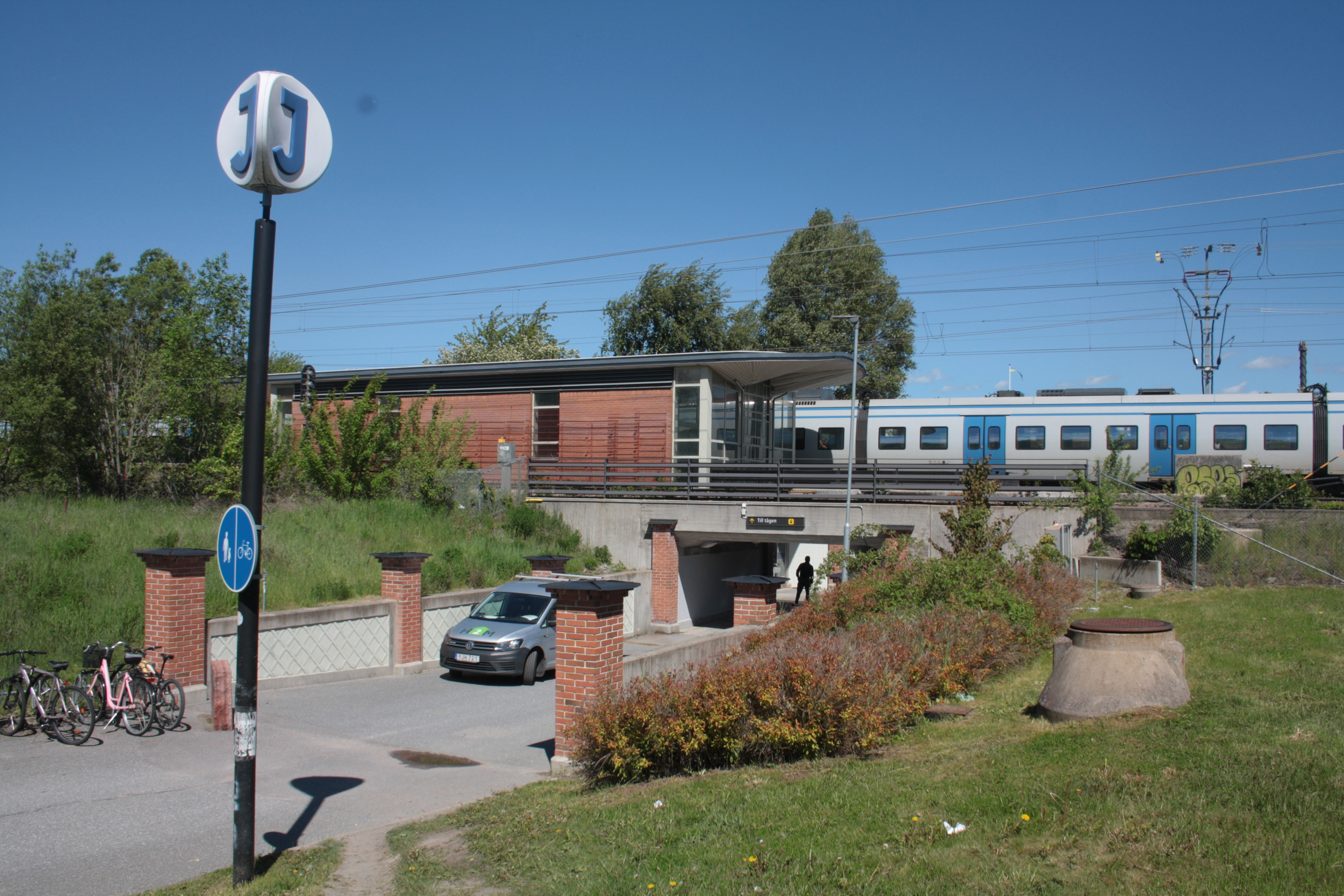
The station

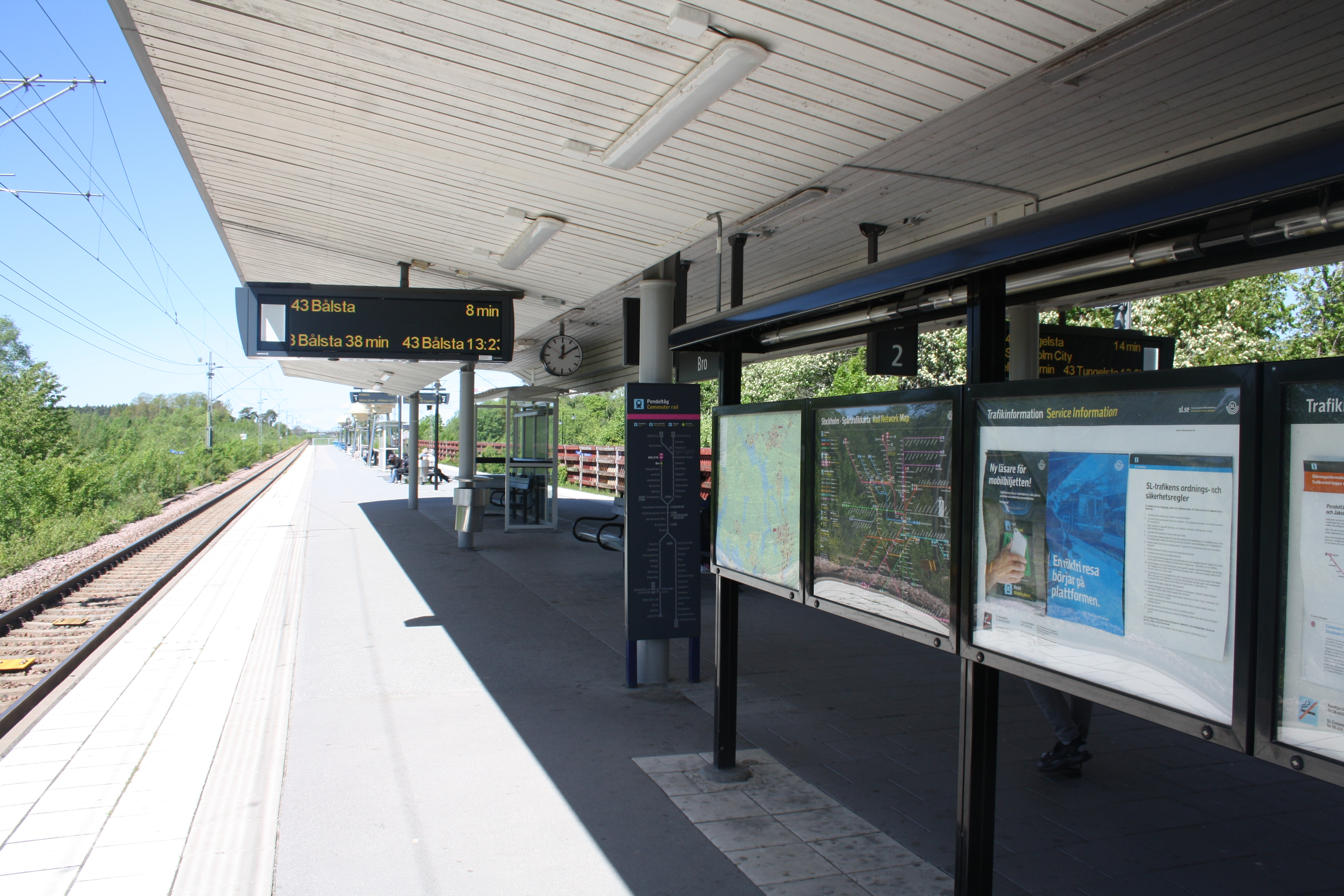
Platform

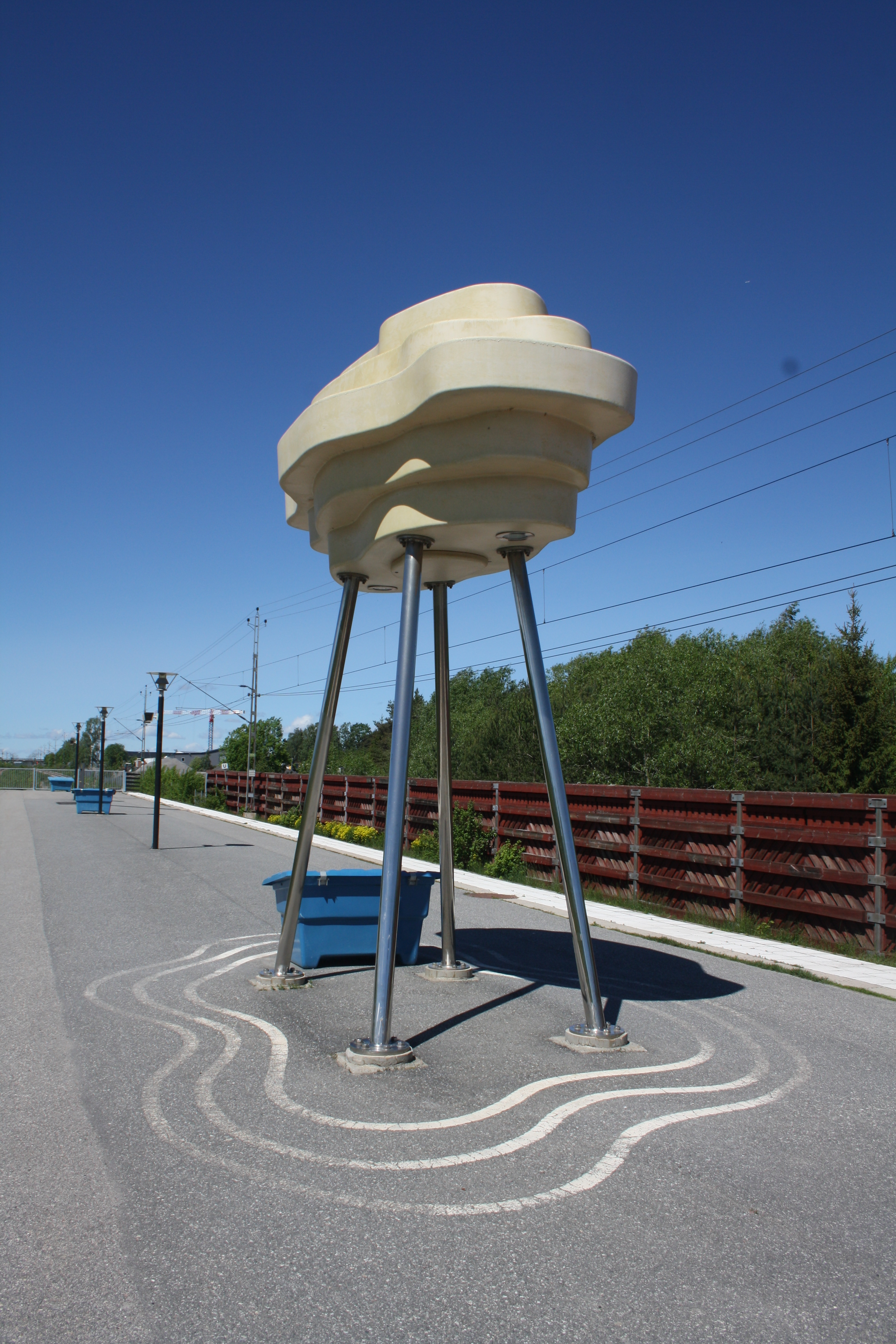
Art installation

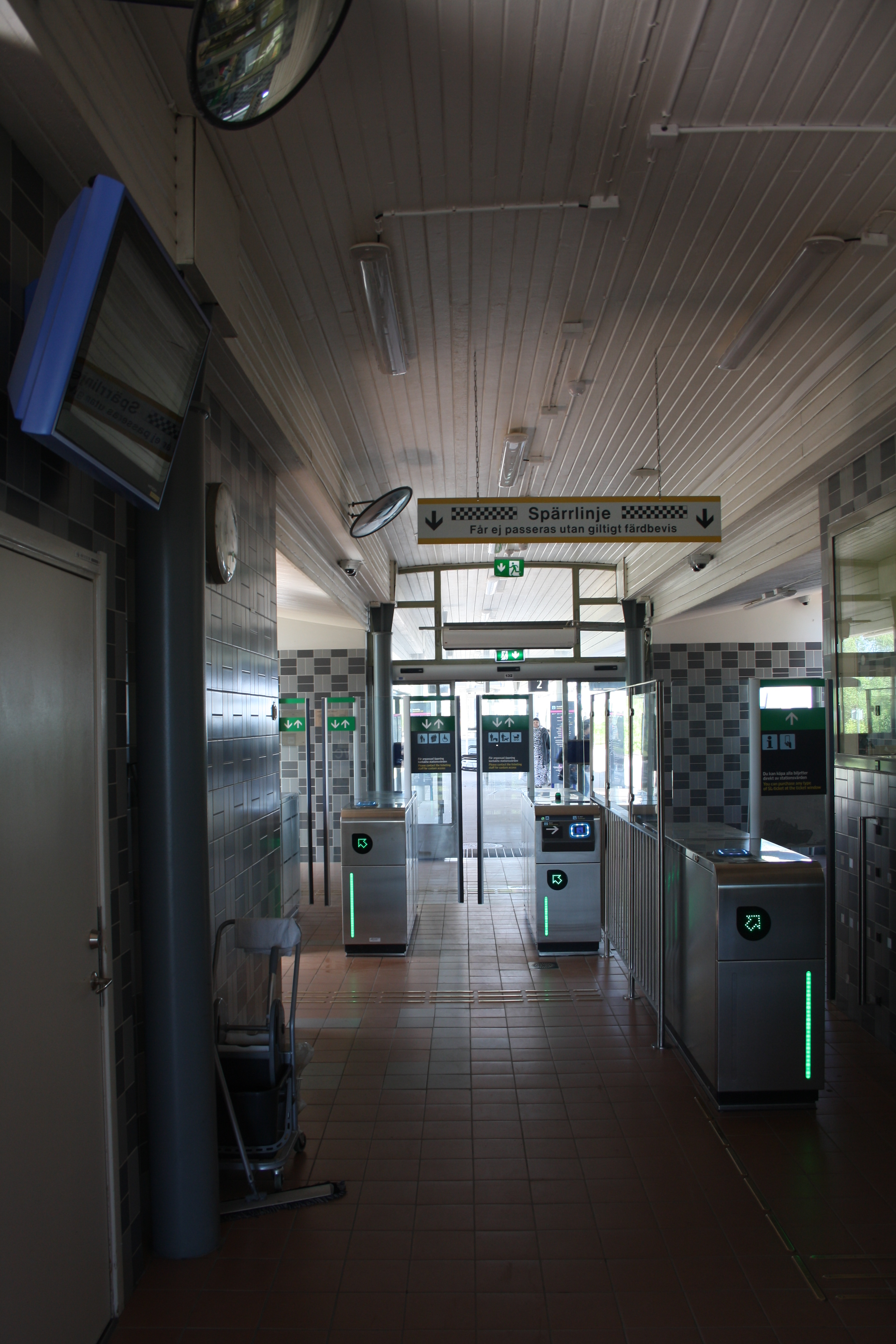
Ticket hall
