= Söderskogen =

- Location within Uppsala Location within Sweden
- Coordinates: 60°13′N 17°50′E
- Country: Sweden
- Province: Uppland
- County: Uppsala County
- Municipality: Håbo Municipality

Area
  - Total: 0.59 km^{2} (0.23 sq mi)

Population (31 December 2020)
  - Total: 381
  - Density: 650/km^{2} (1,700/sq mi)
- Time zone: UTC+1 (CET)
  - Summer (DST): UTC+2 (CEST)

Söderskogen is a locality situated in Håbo Municipality, Uppsala County, Sweden with 378 inhabitants in 2010.
