= Bålstaåsen =

Bålstaåsen (Åsen) is a ridge which makes up the northeastern part of Bålsta, a municipality in Sweden. Its eastern part is home to the Ullevi, Sågarbacken, and Valla neighbourhoods, but the only one of these actually situated on Åsen is Valla. On its western end the ridge abuts Lake Mälaren. Here lies the Granåsen Nature Reserve.

Åsens Villaförening (Åsens Villa Voluntary Association) owns the land on Åsen. Membership in this group costs inhabitants 300 Swedish krona.
