= Slottsskogen, Håbo Municipality =

Slottsskogen
- Location within Uppsala Location within Sweden Location within European Union
- Coordinates: 59°42′N 17°37′E
- Country: Sweden
- Province: Uppland
- County: Uppsala County
- Municipality: Håbo Municipality

Area
  - Total: 1.67 km^{2} (0.64 sq mi)

Population (31 December 2020)
  - Total: 1,746
  - Density: 1,050/km^{2} (2,710/sq mi)
- Time zone: UTC+1 (CET)
  - Summer (DST): UTC+2 (CEST)

Slottsskogen is a locality situated in Håbo Municipality, Uppsala County, Sweden with 1,492 inhabitants in 2010.
