= Bålsta railway station =

Railway station in Håbo, Sweden

Bålsta
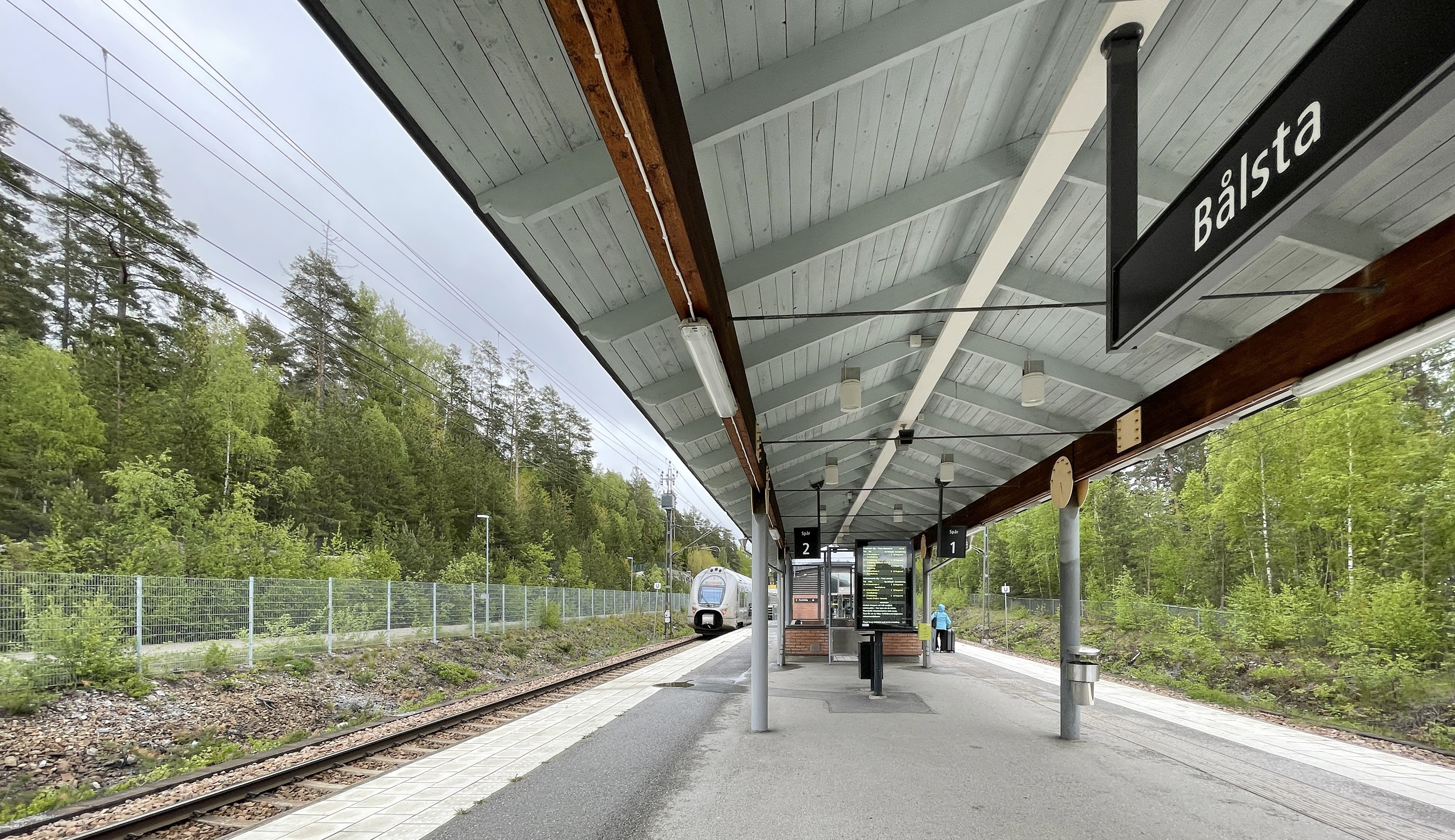
- Bålsta Station in 2021

General information
- Location: Bålsta, Håbo municipality, Uppsala County; Sweden
- Coordinates: 59°34′8″N 17°31′58″E
- System: Pendeltåg, SJ Regional Trains
- Operator: Trafikverket
- Line: Mälaren Line
- Distance: 45.3 km (28.1 mi) from Stockholm C
- Platforms: 3

History
- Opened: 1867
- Closed: 1972
- Rebuilt: 1996

Passengers
- 2019: 2,600 boarding per weekday (commuter rail)

Services
Preceding station	SJ	Following station
Sundbyberg towards Stockholm C	Mälaren Line and Western Main Line	Enköping towards Göteborg C via Örebro C
Preceding station	Stockholm commuter rail	Following station
Terminus	43	Bro towards Nynäshamn
SJ regionaltåg
Location
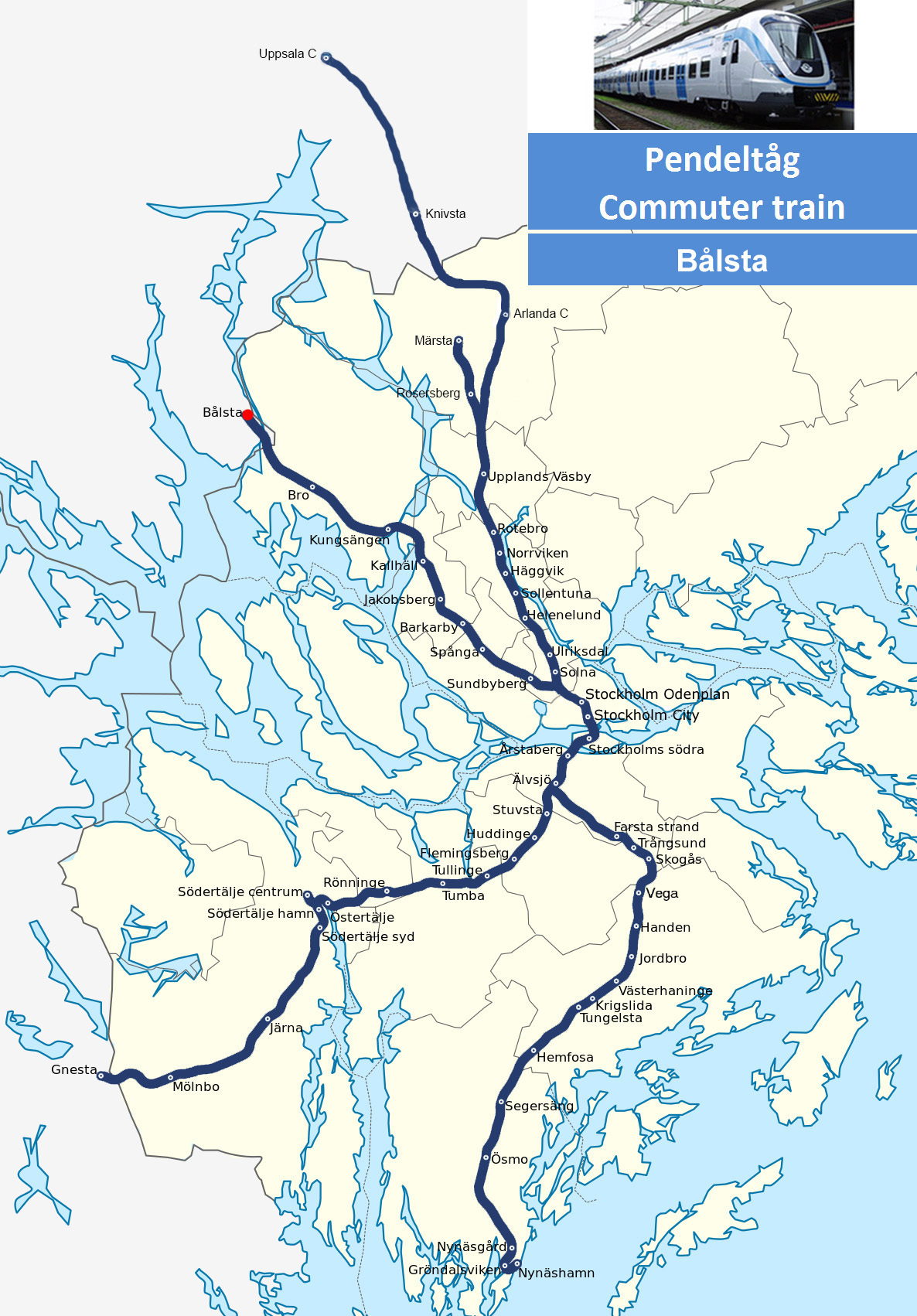

Bålsta is a railway station located in Bålsta in Håbo municipality, Uppsala County, Sweden. It is located 45.3 km from Stockholm Central Station on the Mälaren Line. The station serves long-distance and regional SJ trains, and is also the north-west terminus for Stockholm's commuter trains, despite being located just outside of Stockholm County.

The long-distance train section has two tracks and a central platform. Regional trains stop at Bålsta Station on the Gothenburg-Hallsberg-Västerås-Stockholm route. At the southern end of the main platforms there is an entrance and ticket hall to the SL commuter train section which consists of a track and a side platform.

Until 2018, there was a station building, below the south side of the railway embankment. This was demolished in May 2018, as part the planned redevelopment of the centre of Bålsta. A new bus station area was opened in January 2021.

== History ==
The station was first opened in 1876, through the opening of the Stockholm-Västerås-Bergslagen railway. Passenger train traffic remained until 1972, when the station was closed. The old station building still exists about 1.5 km west of the current station.

The current station was opened in 1996, as part of work to expand regional train traffic on the Mälaren Line. In 2001, Stockholm's commuter train service was extended to Bålsta, and it is now the terminus of SL Line 43.

== Gallery ==
=== Old Station ===
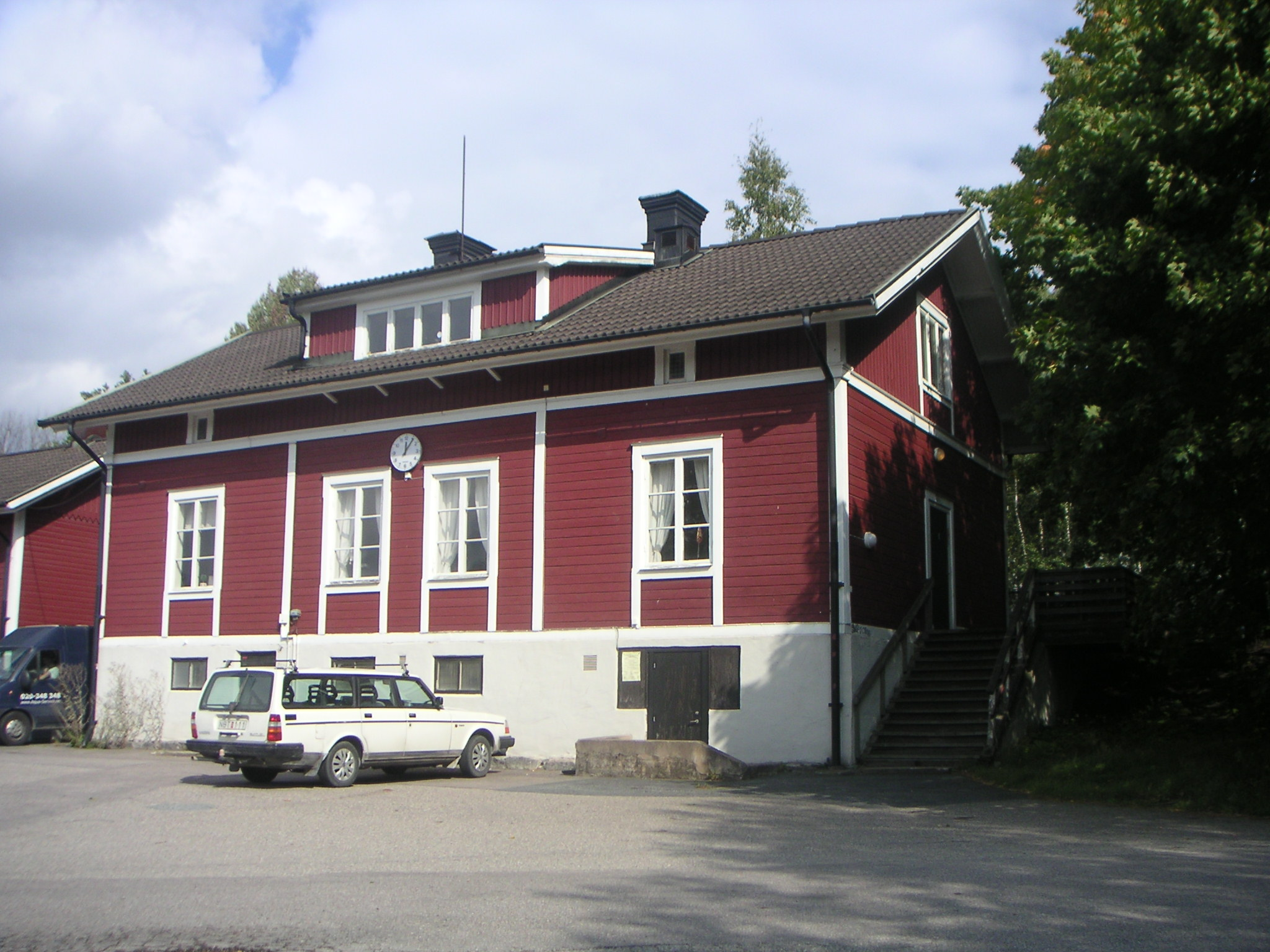

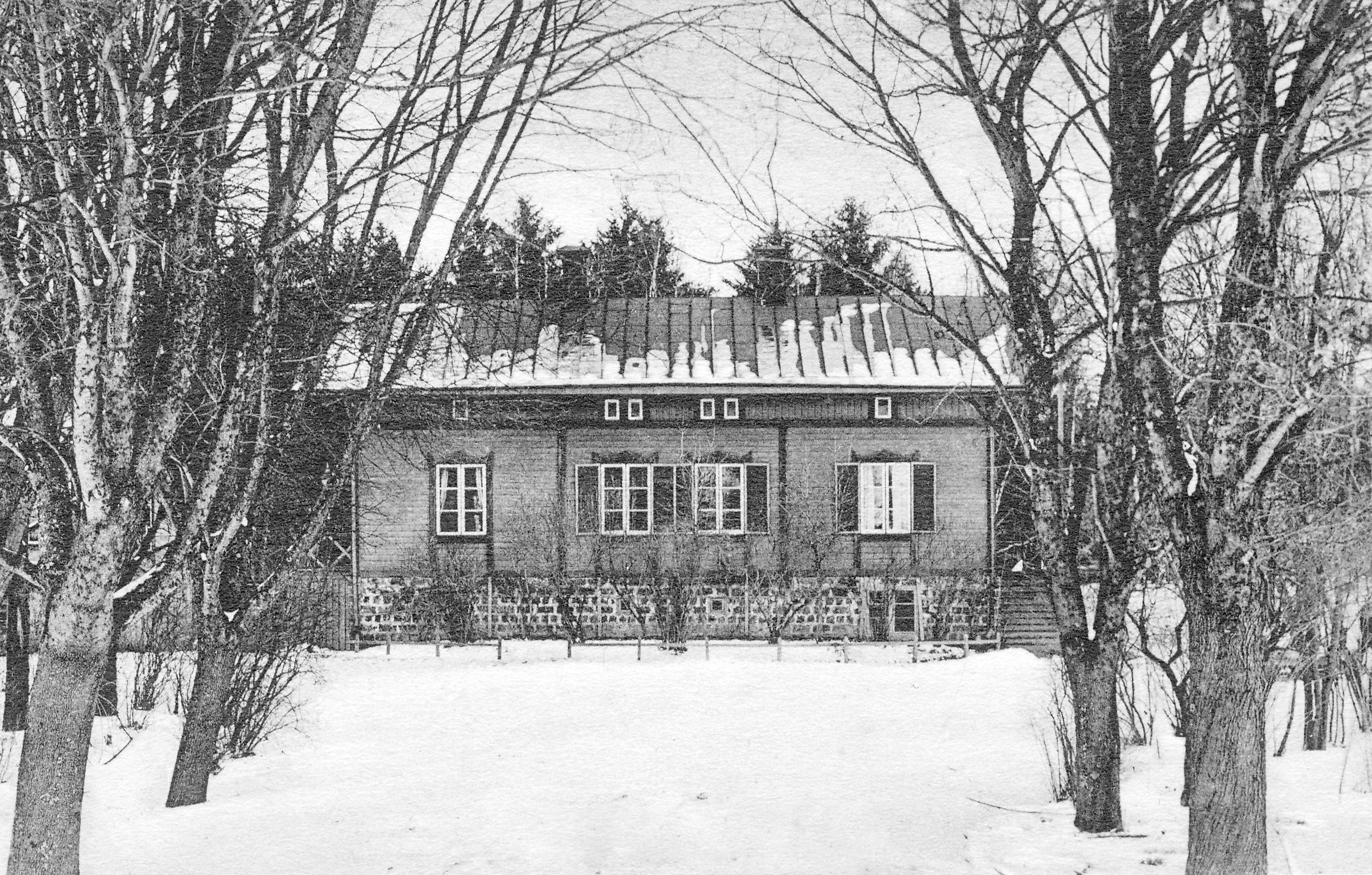

=== Exterior ===
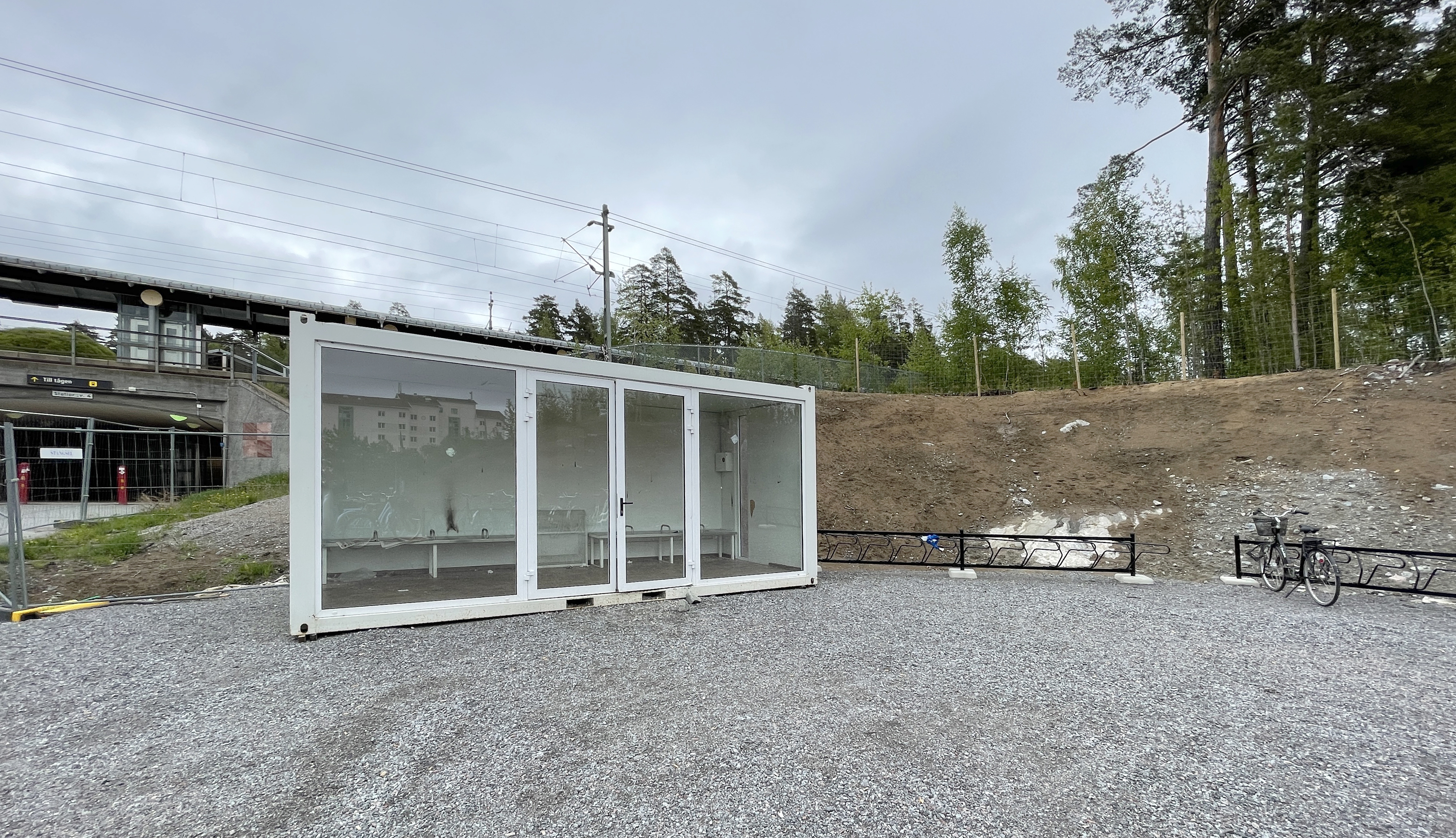
Temporary Waiting Area

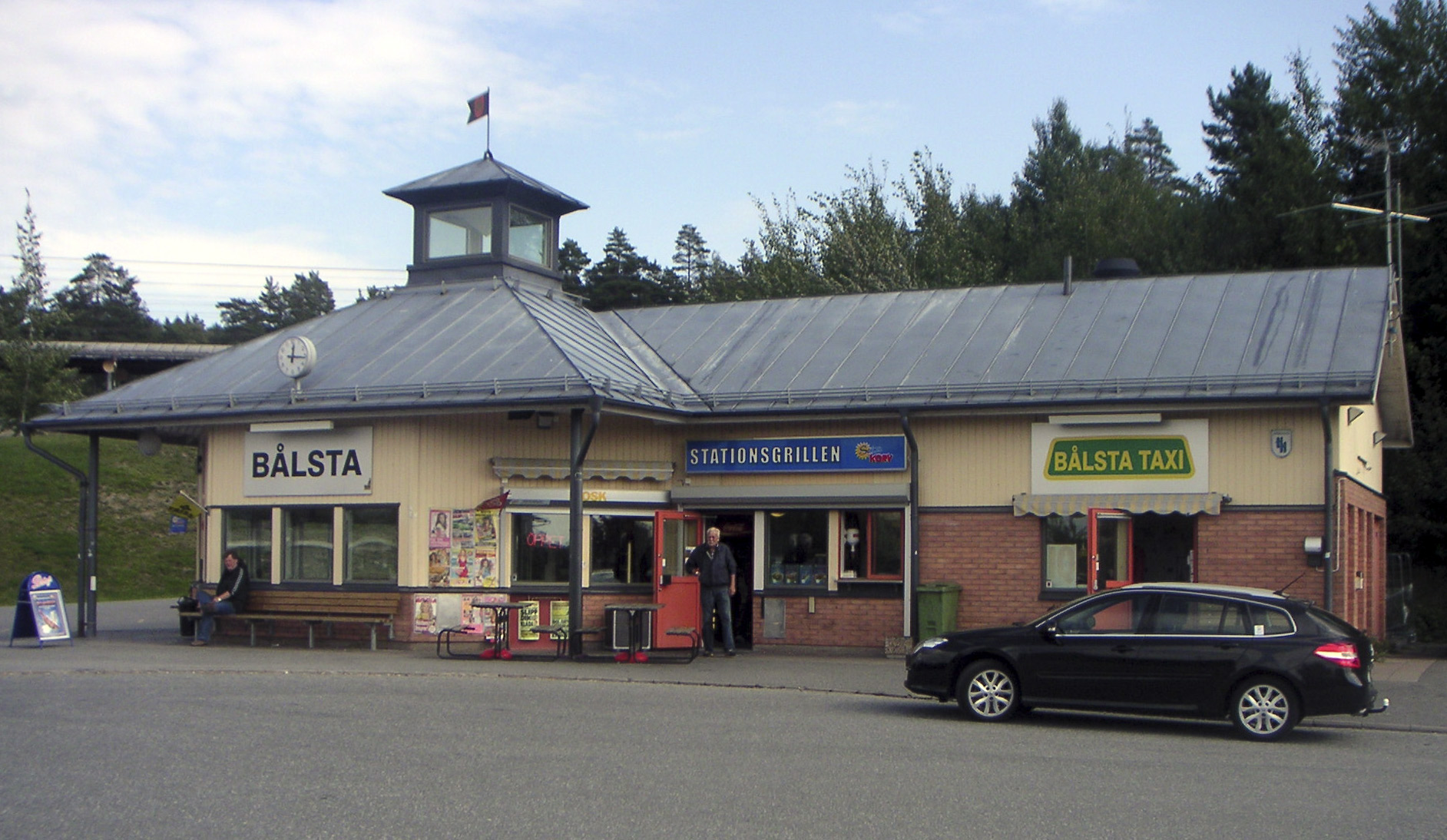
Former Waiting Area

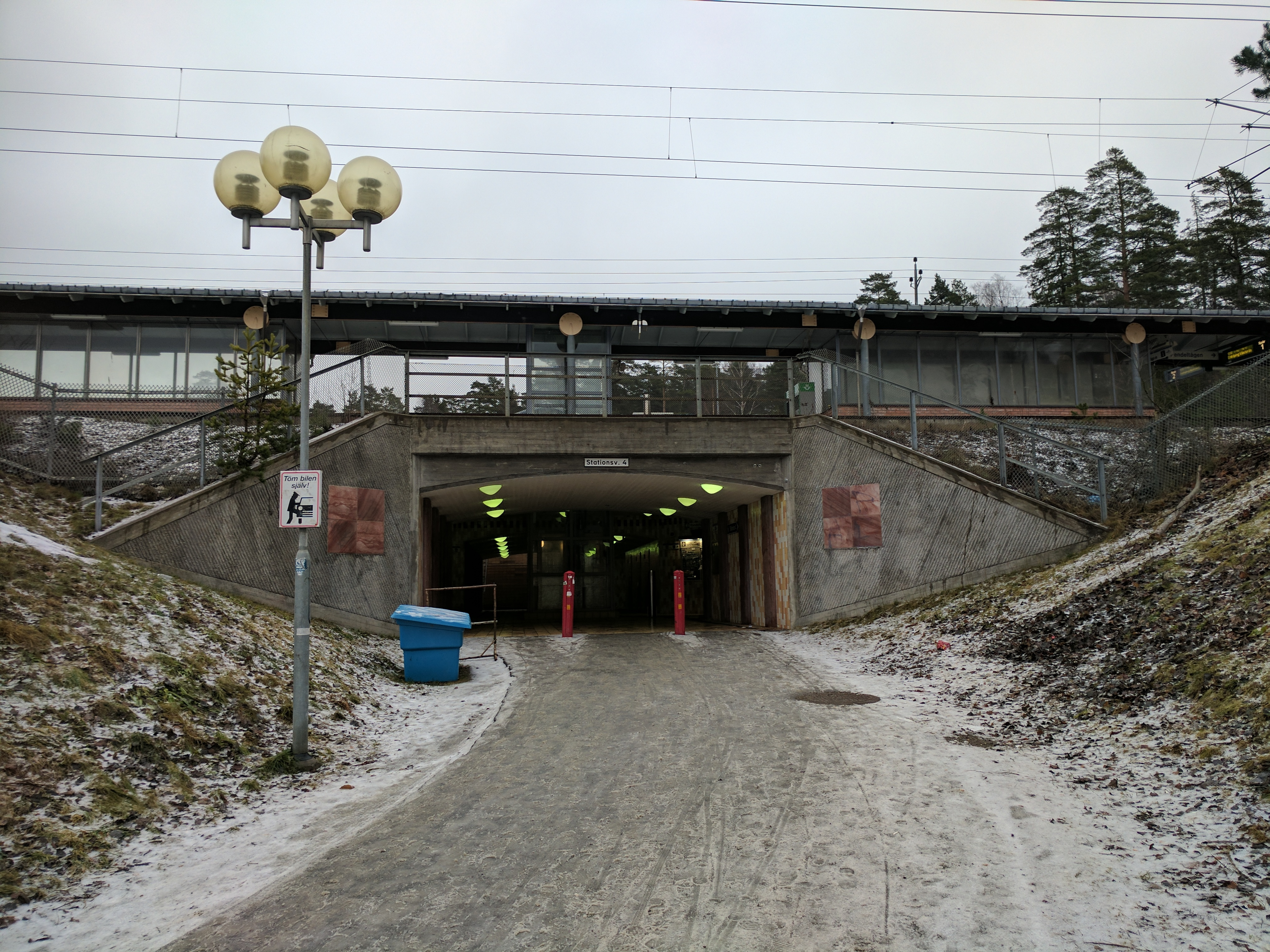
Entrance Passage

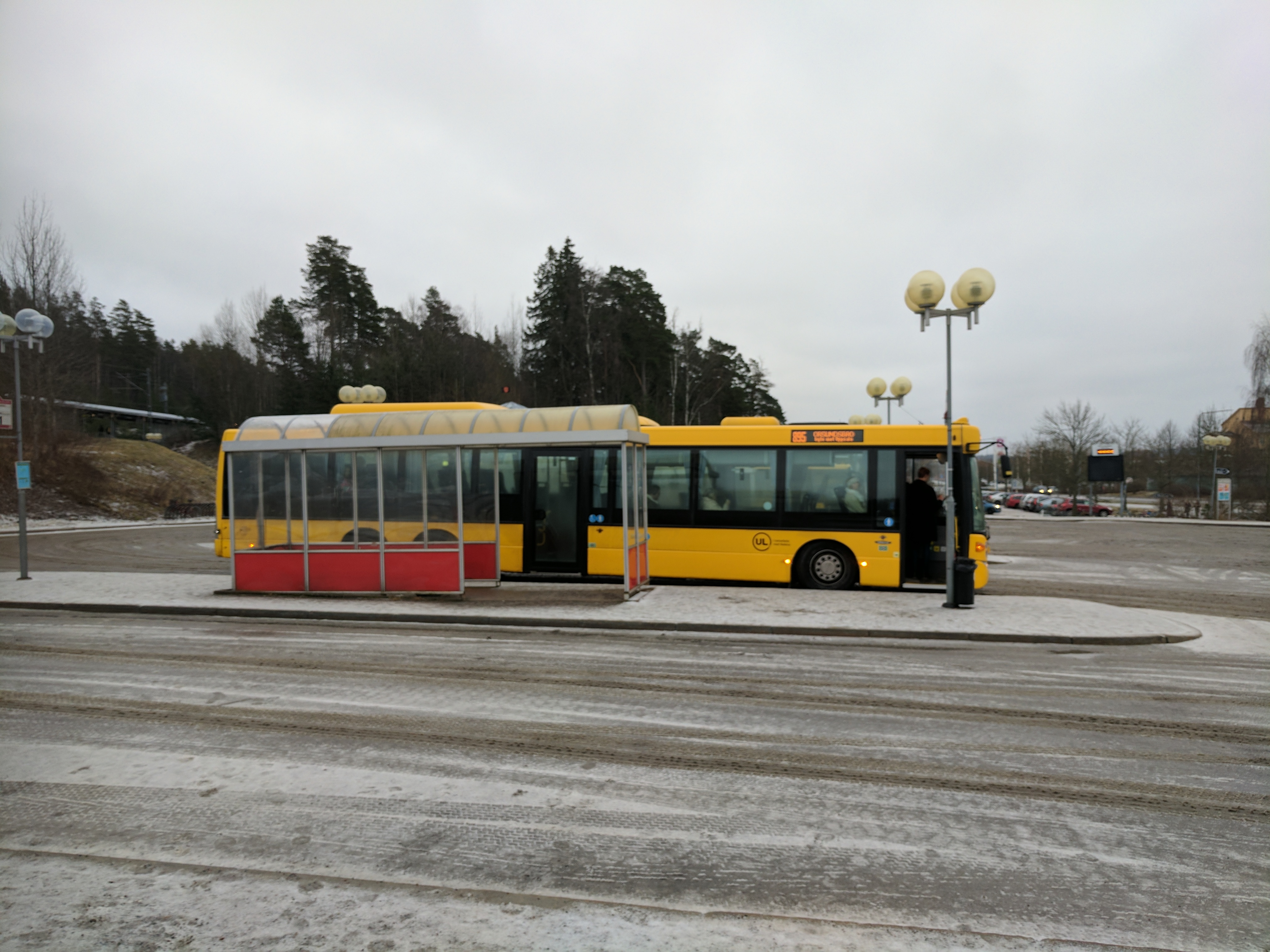
Bus Station

=== Main Platforms ===
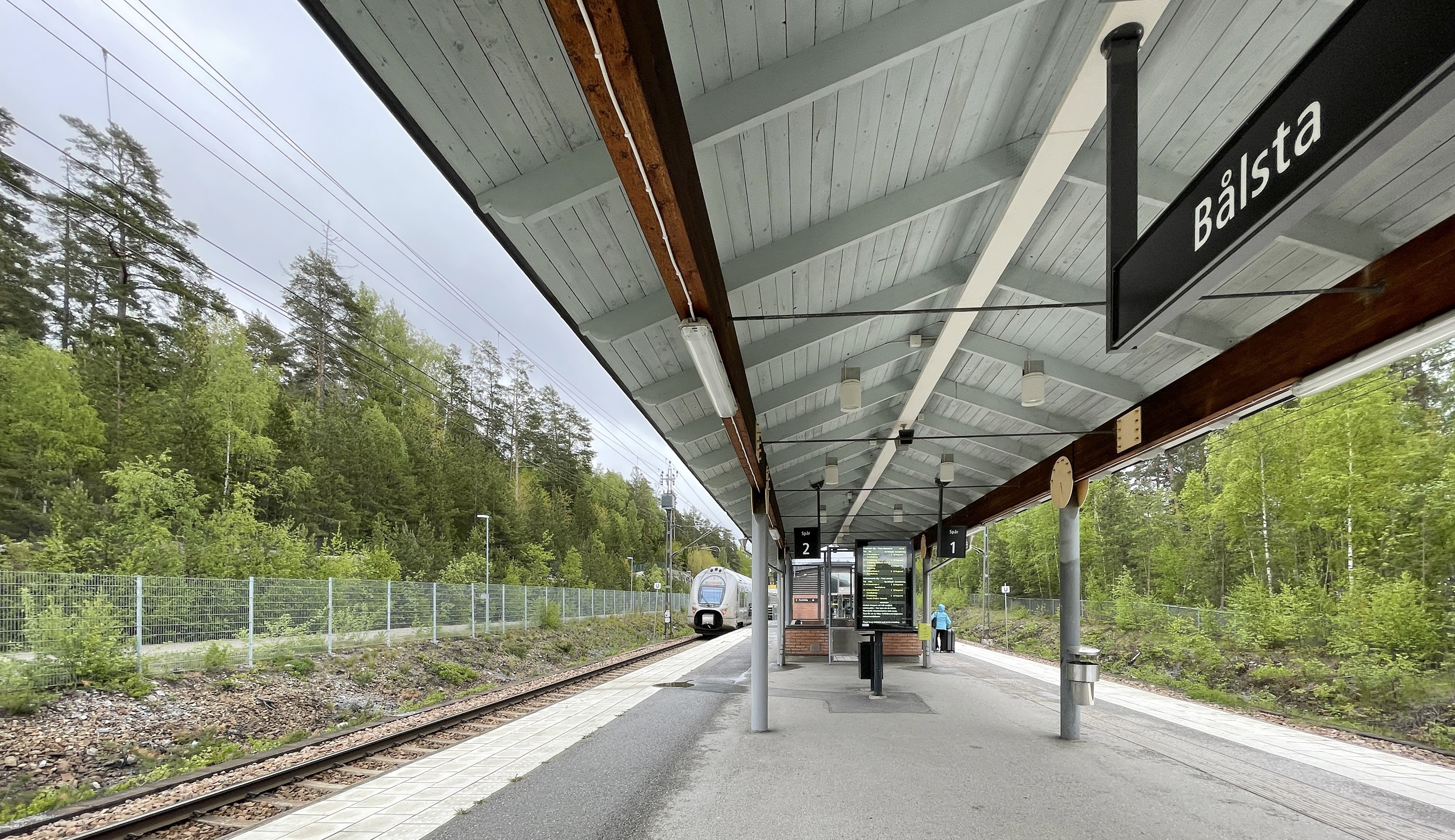

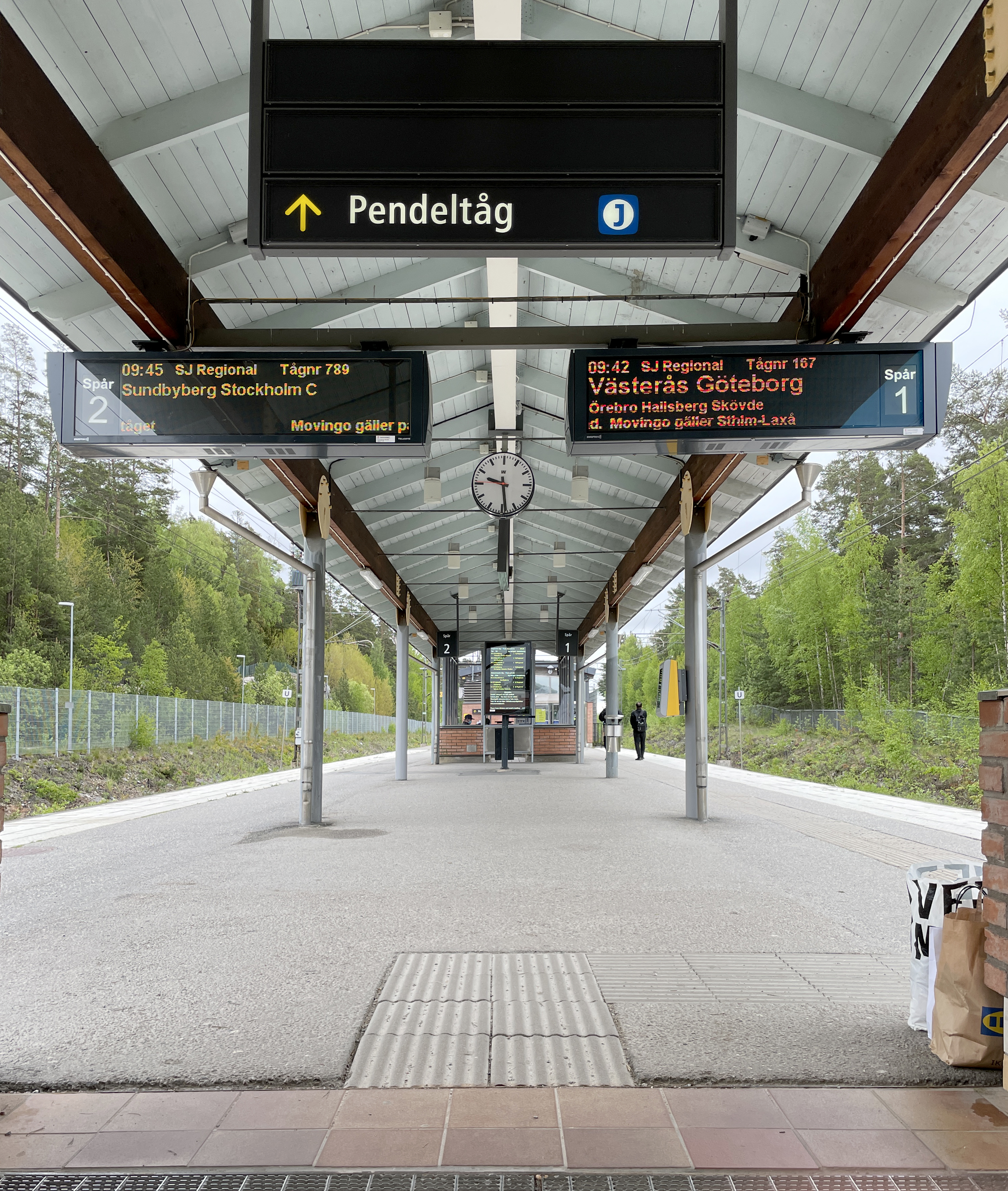

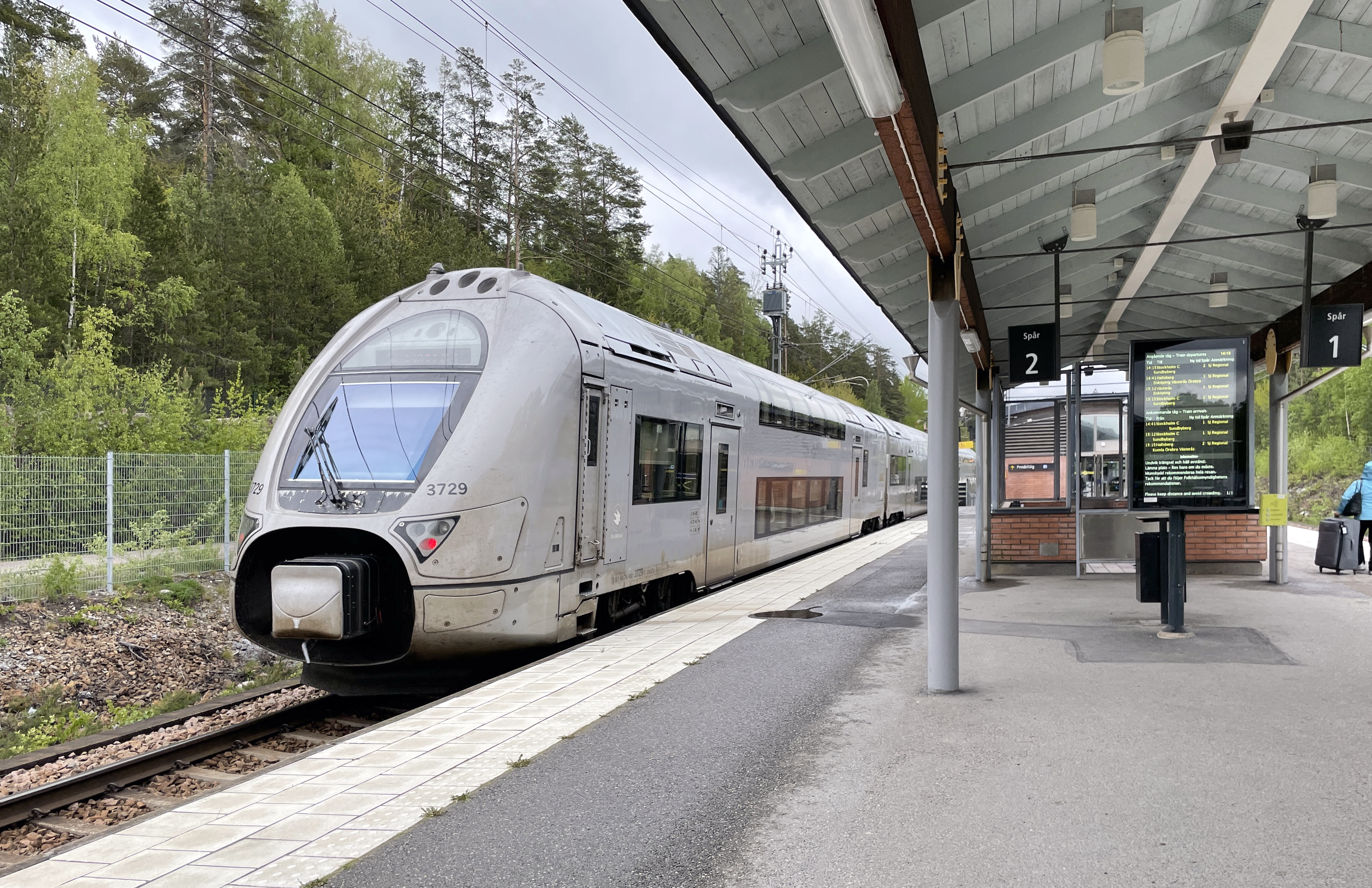

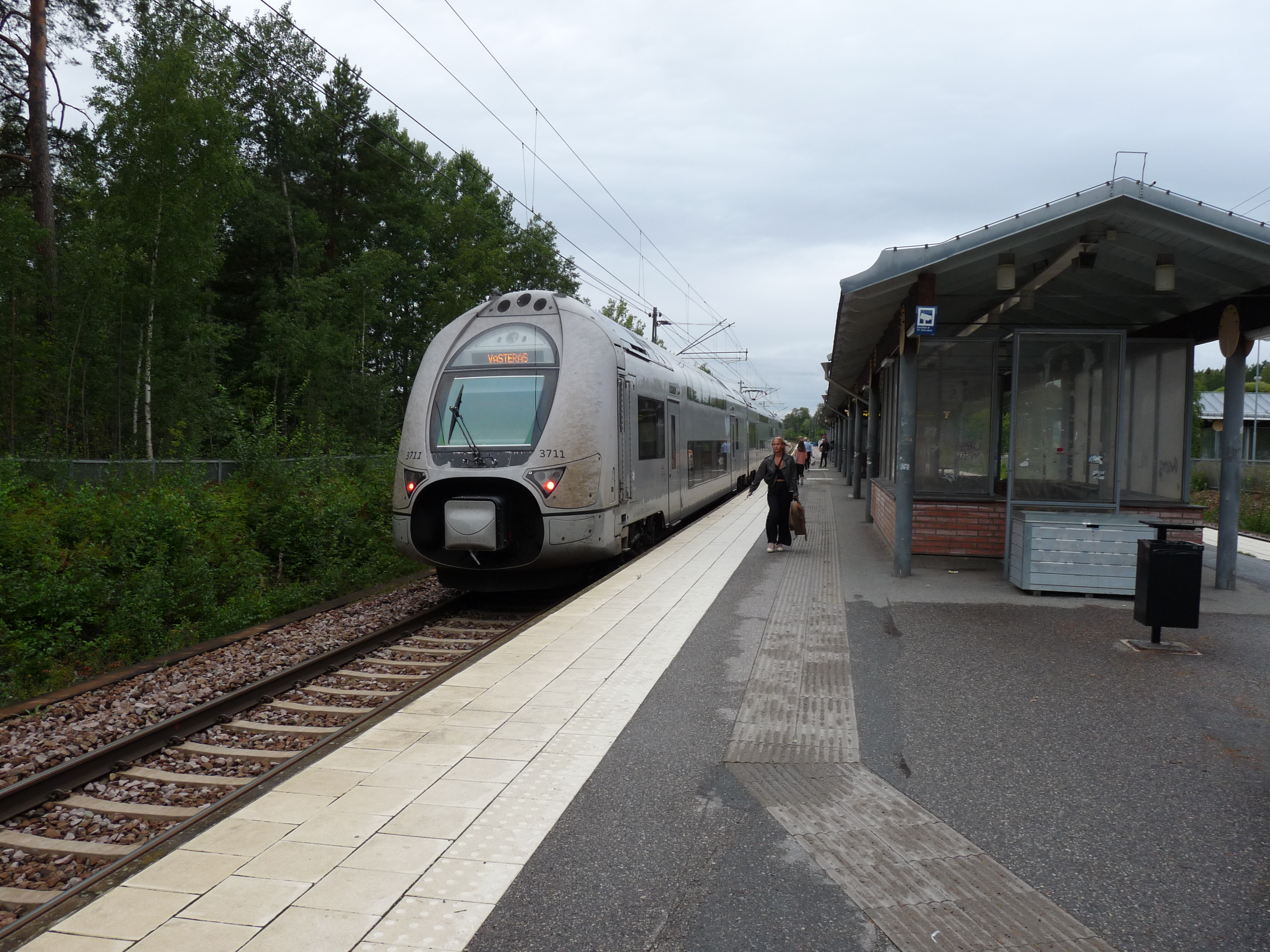

=== Commuter Train Station ===
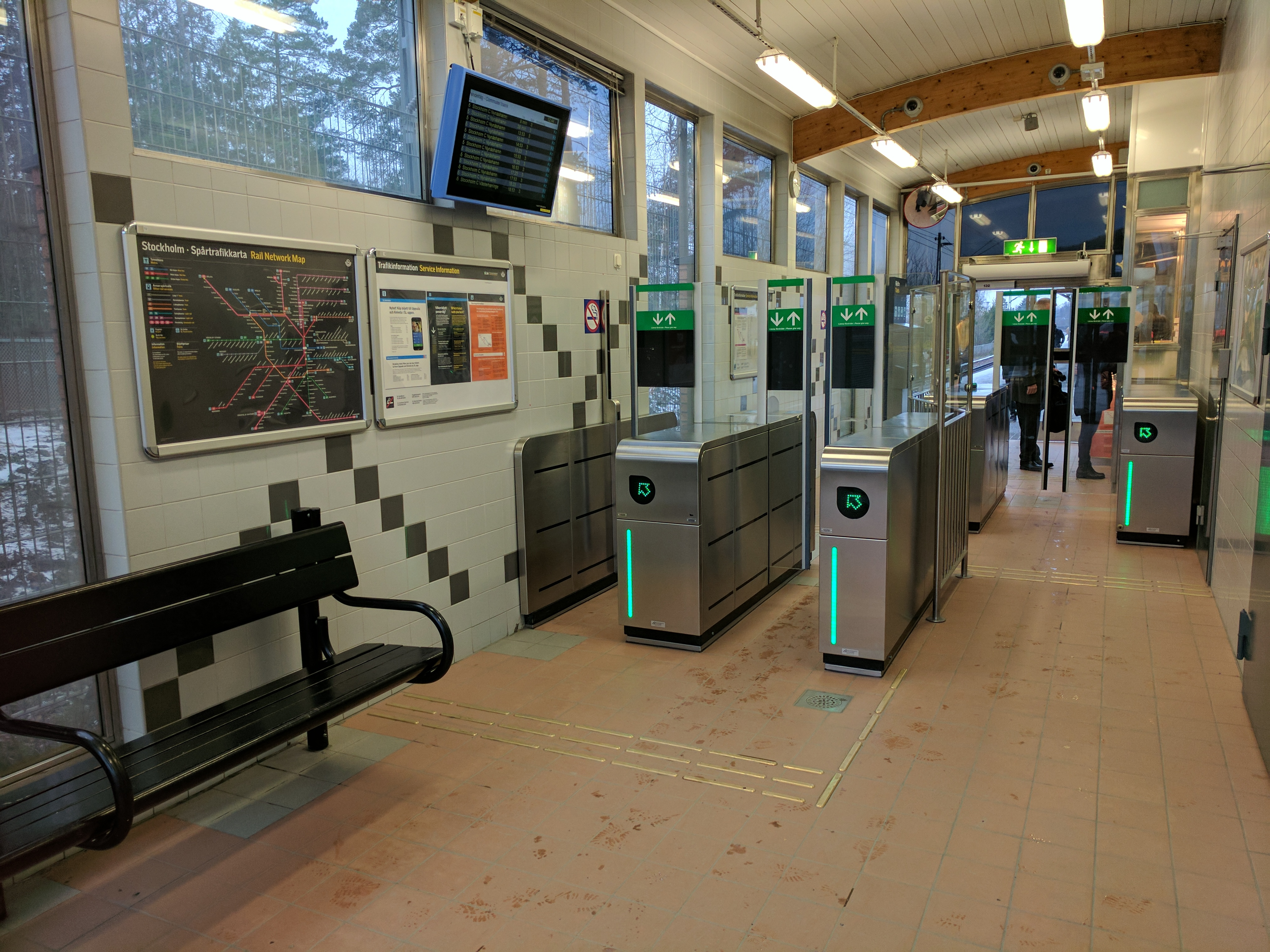

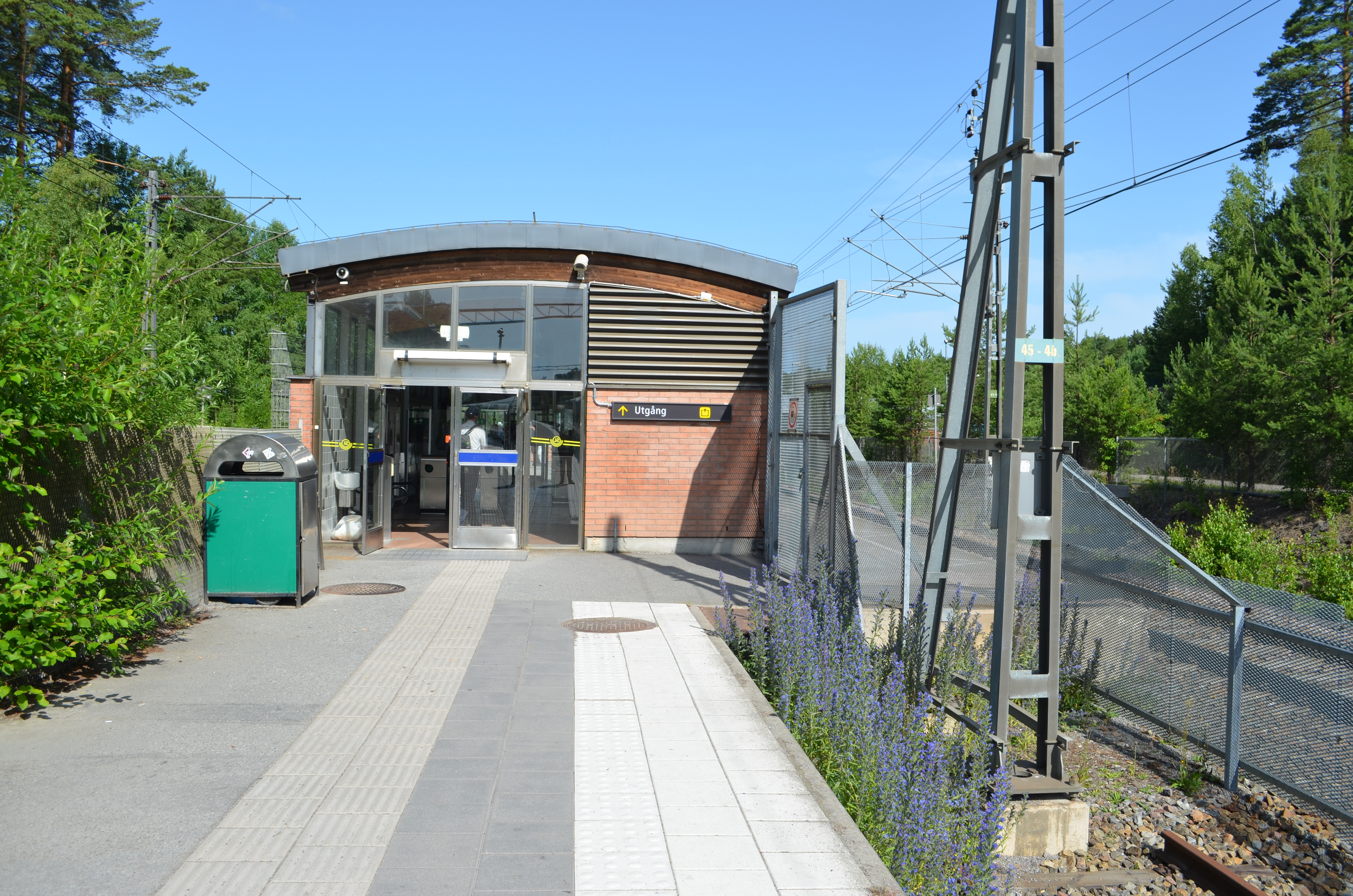

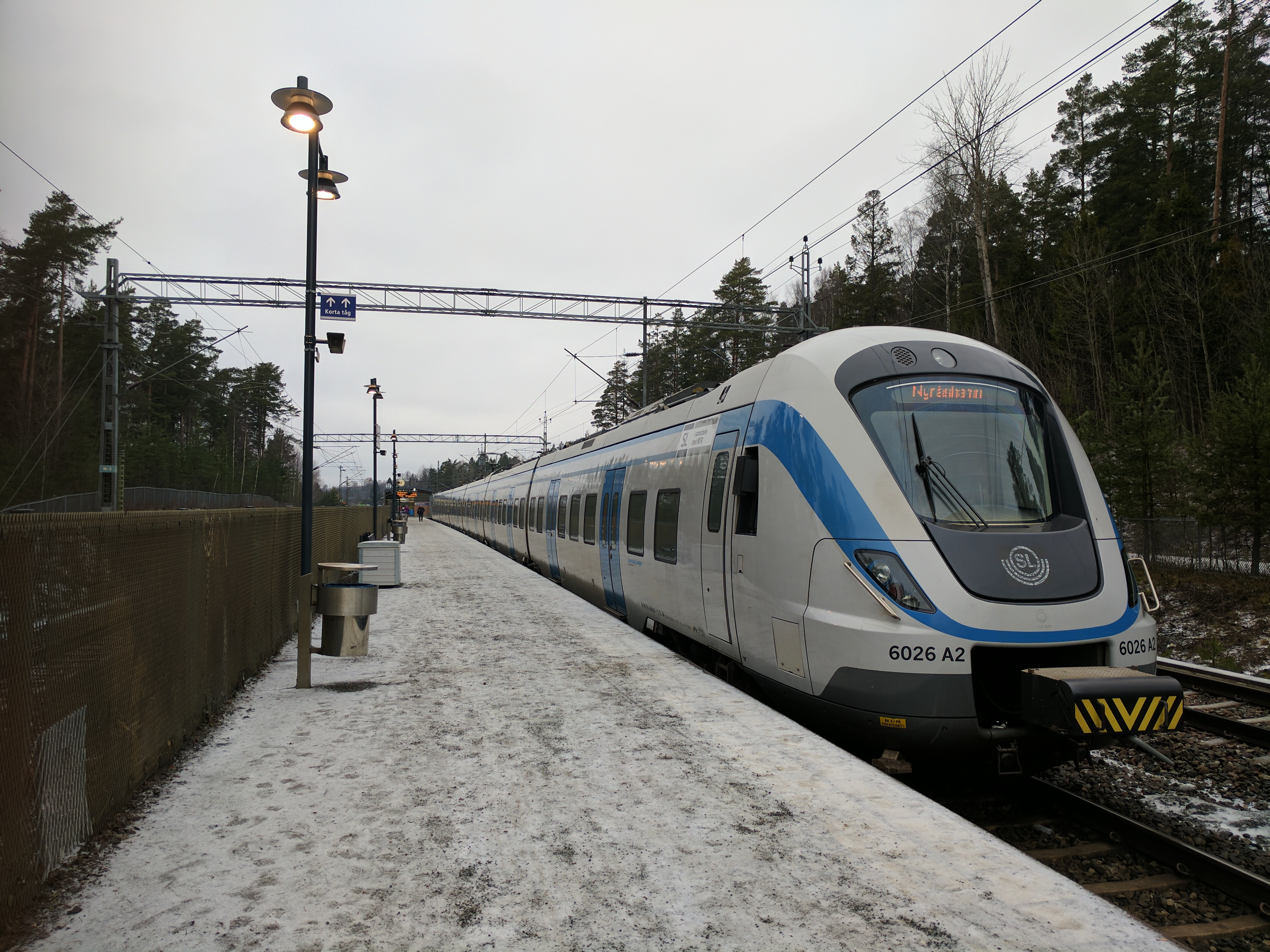

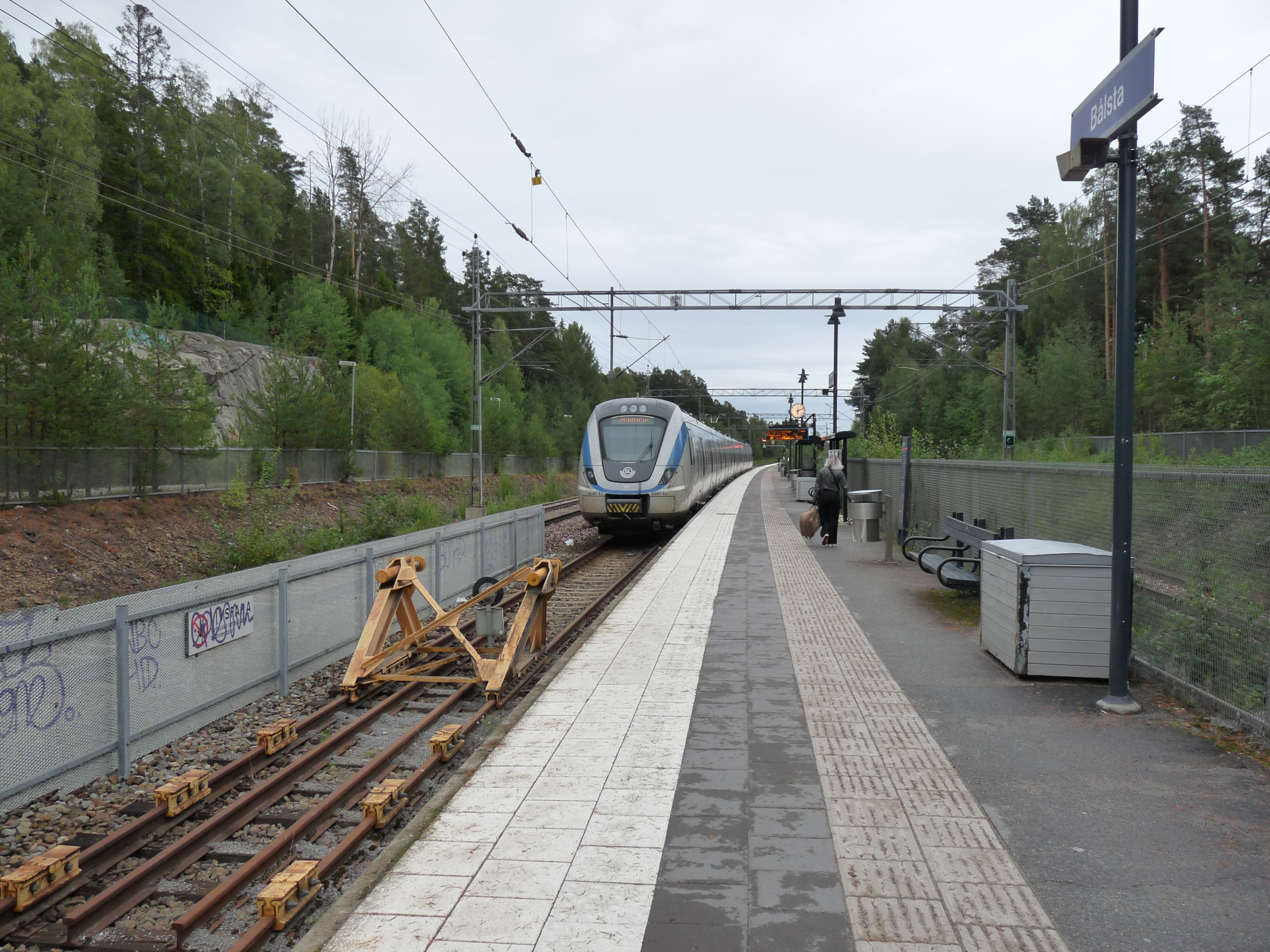
