= Håbo Municipality =

Håbo Municipality Håbo kommun
- Municipality
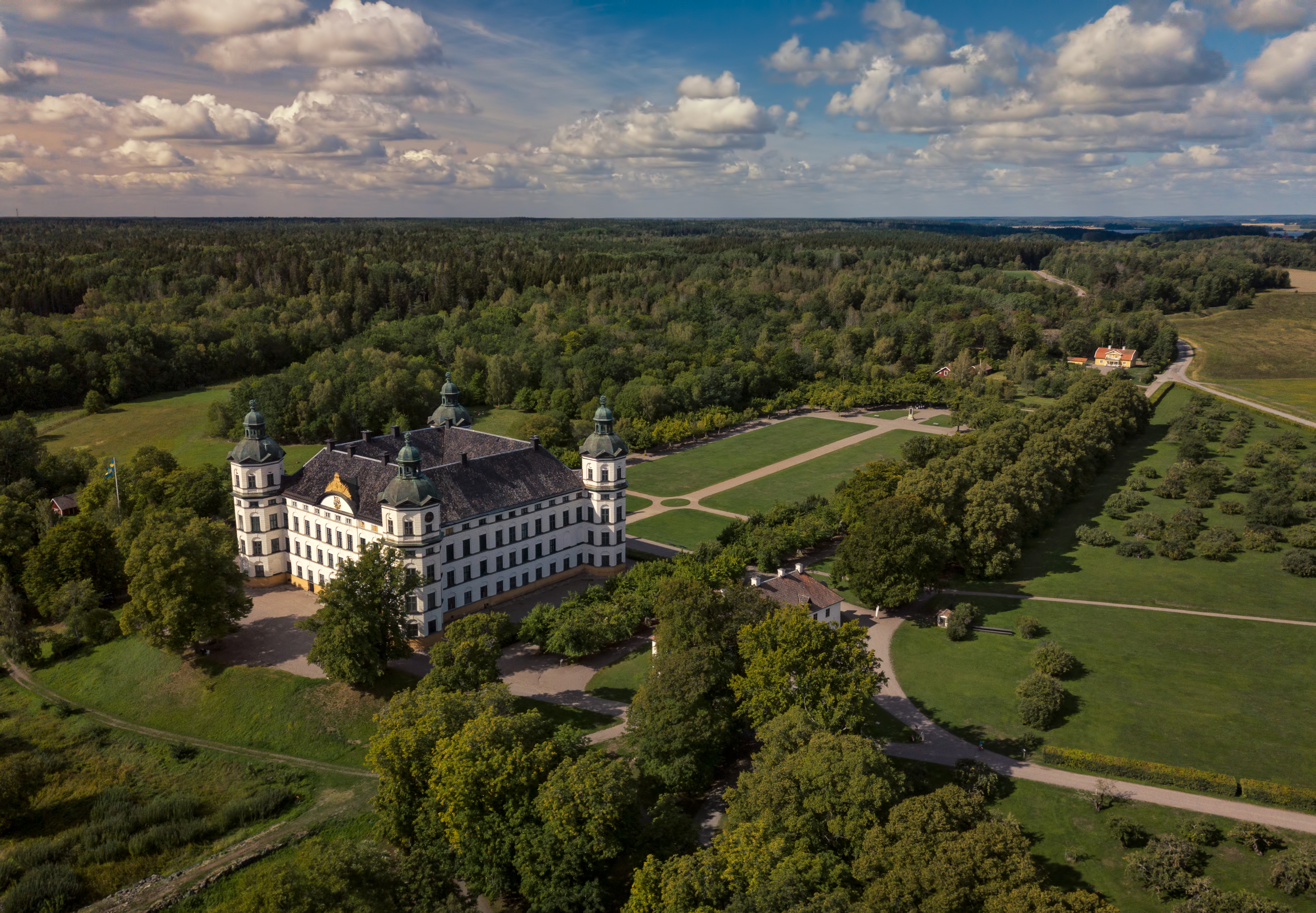
- Skokloster castle

- Coat of arms

- Coordinates: 59°35′N 17°30′E
- Country: Sweden
- County: Uppsala County
- Seat: Bålsta

Area
  - Total: 186.47 km^{2} (72.00 sq mi)
  - Land: 143.75 km^{2} (55.50 sq mi)
  - Water: 42.72 km^{2} (16.49 sq mi)
- Area as of 1 January 2014.

Population (30 June 2025)
  - Total: 23,098
  - Density: 160.68/km^{2} (416.16/sq mi)
- Time zone: UTC+1 (CET)
  - Summer (DST): UTC+2 (CEST)
- ISO 3166 code: SE
- Province: Uppland
- Municipal code: 0305
- Website: www.habo.se

Håbo Municipality (Swedish: Håbo kommun) is a municipality in Uppsala County in east central Sweden. Its seat is located in the town of Bålsta.

The municipality was formed in connection with the local government reform of 1952.

== Localities ==
- Bålsta (seat)
- Slottsskogen

Since 2001, the municipality is connected with the Stockholm commuter rail system by an extension to Bålsta railway station. Coming with this, Bålsta now also offers interchange to regional railways, similar to Märsta, Sundbyberg and Södertälje.

== Demographics ==
This is a demographic table based on Håbo Municipality's electoral districts in the 2022 Swedish general election sourced from SVT's election platform, in turn taken from SCB official statistics.

In total there were 22,319 residents, including 16,323 Swedish citizens of voting age. 36.4% voted for the left coalition and 62.5% for the right coalition. Indicators are in percentage points except population totals and income.

Location	Residents	Citizen adults	Left vote	Right vote	Employed	Swedish parents	Foreign heritage	Income SEK	Degree
Location			%	%					
Gamla Bålsta-Pomona	1,895	1,520	42.9	55.9	78	75	25	23,146	30
Häggeby-Övergran	1,917	1,502	33.6	65.4	83	82	18	30,238	37
Krägga-Graneberg	2,107	1,564	33.4	65.3	84	80	20	30,393	31
Mansängen-Draget	2,094	1,535	45.1	53.0	72	62	38	21,088	27
Råby-Frösunda	2,004	1,412	32.4	67.1	89	85	15	33,616	42
Skokloster	2,041	1,419	29.3	69.5	83	76	24	27,552	29
Skörby-Gillmarken	2,128	1,491	33.2	65.8	88	82	18	33,033	39
Väppeby-Kalmarsand	2,004	1,499	38.2	60.9	81	79	21	27,979	33
Väppebyberget-Viby	2,327	1,566	37.3	61.9	88	82	18	32,791	39
Västerängen-Åkerby	1,956	1,380	36.8	62.0	85	78	22	29,405	40
Åsenområdet	1,846	1,435	38.4	60.8	87	83	17	31,385	37
Source: SVT

== See also ==
- Håbo Hundred
