= Mälaren Line =

Railway line in Sweden

Mälarbanan
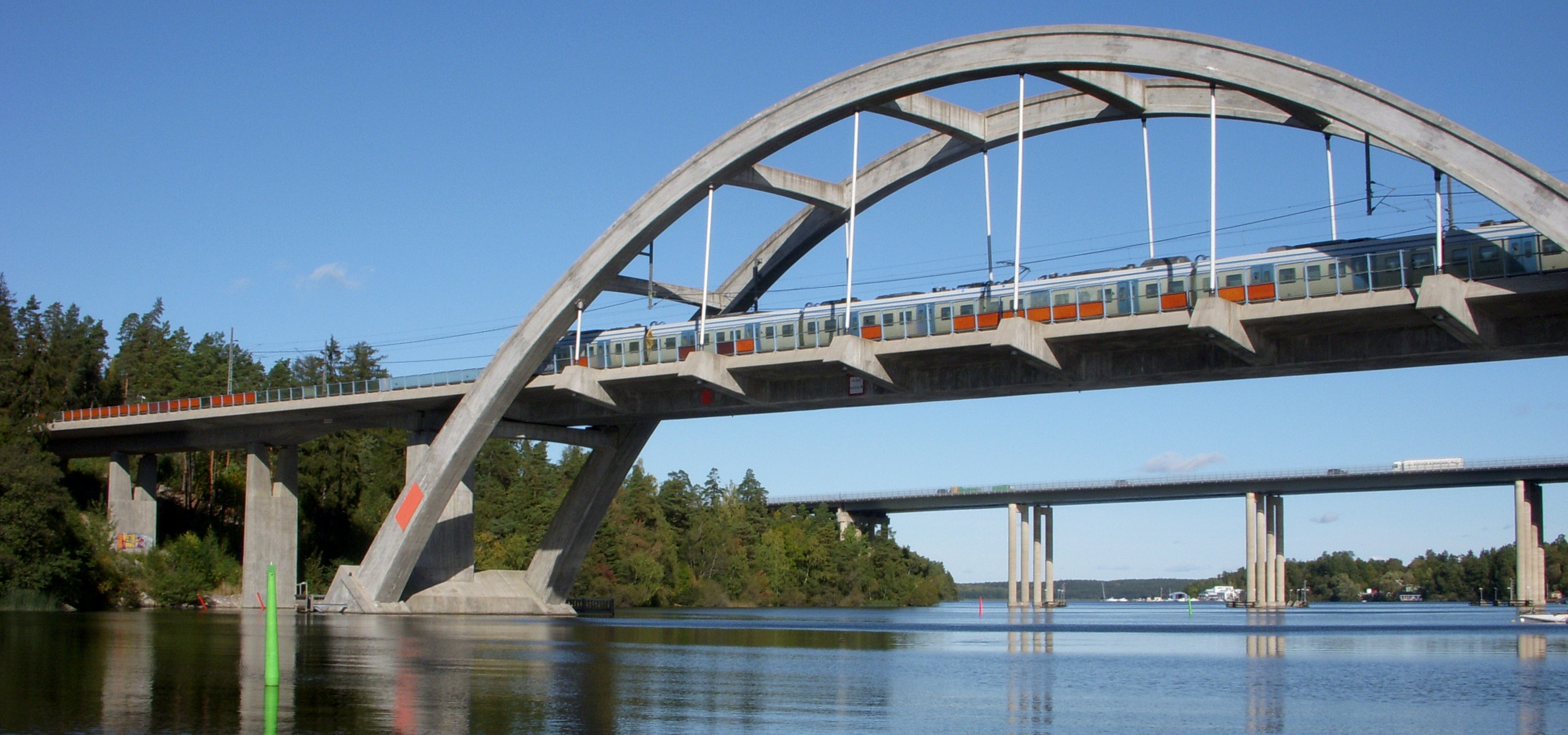
- Stäketbron

Overview
- Owner: Swedish Transport Administration
- Locale: Sweden
- Termini: Stockholm; Hovsta/Frövi (Örebro)

Technical
- Line length: 187 km (116.20 mi)
- Track gauge: 1,435 mm (4 ft 8 1/2 in) standard gauge
- Operating speed: Service: 200 km/h (125 mph); Design: 250 km/h (155 mph)

The Mälaren Line (Swedish: Mälarbanan) is a railway line from Stockholm via Västerås to Örebro in Sweden. The section from Stockholm to Kolbäck and from Valskog to Arboga has double track. The line was upgraded to high-speed in 2005. The line is mostly used by passenger trains, although it is also served by some freight trains. It takes its name from lake Mälaren, along the northern edge of which the railway runs. To the west, the line connects with the Freight Line Through Bergslagen. The Stockholm commuter rail system uses the tracks east of Bålsta, in addition to the intercity trains.
