= Bålsta =

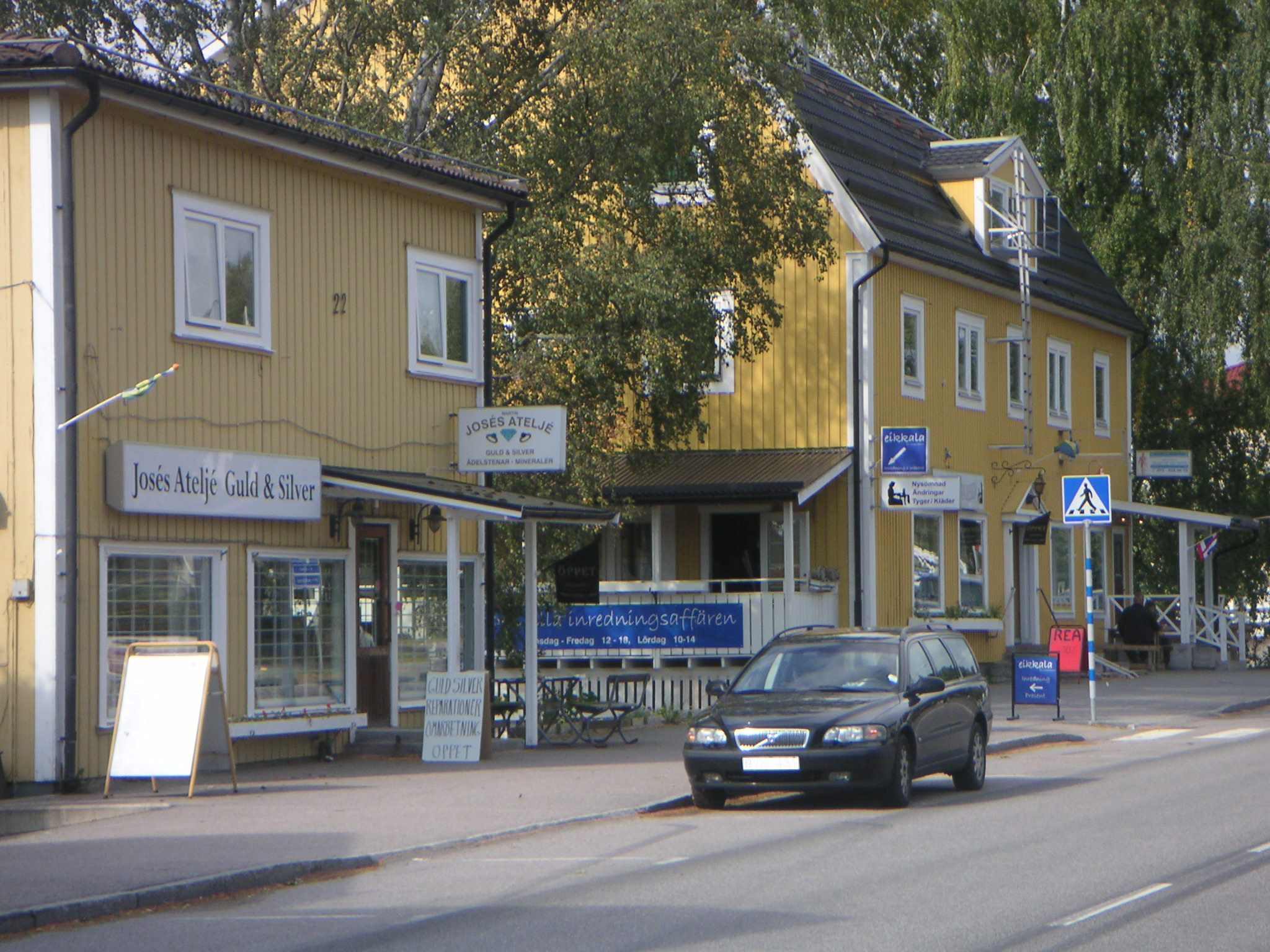
- Stockholmsvägen in Old Bålsta

- Location within Uppsala Location within Sweden
- Coordinates: 59°35′N 17°30′E
- Country: Sweden
- Province: Uppland
- County: Uppsala County
- Municipality: Håbo Municipality

Area
  - Total: 10.97 km^{2} (4.24 sq mi)

Population (31 December 2020)
  - Total: 15,436
  - Density: 1,407/km^{2} (3,644/sq mi)
- Time zone: UTC+1 (CET)
  - Summer (DST): UTC+2 (CEST)

Bålsta is a locality and the seat of Håbo Municipality, Uppsala County, Sweden with 13,138 inhabitants in 2015.

Although not in Stockholm County, it has Bålsta railway station, the north-western terminus of the Stockholm commuter rail system. Many inhabitants commute to Stockholm. The travel time is 40 minutes by suburban train, and less than 30 minutes by commuter-or intercity rail. Lasse Åberg, a famous Swedish actor, musician and artist, lives in Bålsta and has opened a museum there.

Even though Bålsta's relatively small size, there are many organizations and activity-centers in the town, such as a hockey-arena hosting the team Bålsta HC. It also has a mall with several stores.

== Famous people from Bålsta ==
- Martin Björk, Swedish television presenter
- Daniel Jarl, Swedish football player
- Marcus Nilson, Swedish professional ice hockey player
- Kim Amb, Swedish professional javelin thrower
- Filip Windlert, Swedish professional Ice hockey player for AIK in HockeyAllsvenskan
- Lasse Åberg, Swedish actor, musician, film director and artist.

== See also ==
- Bålstaåsen
