= Strand =

Strand or The Strand may refer to:

== Topography ==
- The flat area of land bordering a body of water, a:
  - Strand plain
  - Beach
  - Shoreline
- Strand swamp, a type of swamp habitat in Florida

== Places ==
=== Africa ===
- Strand, Western Cape, a seaside town in South Africa
- Strand Street, a road in Cape Town, South Africa

=== Asia ===
- A park alongside the river Ganges in Chandannagar, India
- Strand Road, Kolkata, a road alongside the river Ganges in Kolkata, India

=== Australia ===
- The Strand Arcade, a Victorian shopping arcade in Sydney, Australia
- The Strand, Townsville, a beachside foreshore in Townsville, Australia

=== New Zealand ===
- The Strand, Auckland, a street in Auckland, New Zealand
- The Strand, Tauranga, Tauranga, New Zealand
- The Strand Station, the former main railway station of Auckland, New Zealand, known as The Strand for excursion trains

=== United Kingdom ===
- Strand (London County Council constituency), former constituency
- Strand (UK Parliament constituency), former constituency in the City of Westminster
- Strand, County Down, a townland in County Down, Northern Ireland
- Strand, London, a street in Central London
- St Mary le Strand (parish), City of Westminster
- Strand District (Metropolis), a local government district within the metropolitan area of London, England, from 1855 to 1900
- The Strand, Wiltshire, a hamlet
- The Strand, recreation area in Gillingham, Kent
- New Strand Shopping Centre, a shopping centre in Bootle, Merseyside
- Strands, Cumbria, Cumbria

=== Europe ===
==== Norway ====
- Strand Municipality, a municipality in Rogaland county
- Strand, Akershus, a village area in Bærum municipality in Akershus county
- Strand, Nordland, a village in Sortland municipality in Nordland county
- Strand, Vestfold, a village in Sandefjord municipality in Vestfold county

==== Other ====
- Strand (island), a German island that was split into two by the Burchardi Flood of 1634
- Ștrand, a district of Sibiu, Romania
- Štrand, a beach on the Danube in Novi Sad, Serbia
- Strand, Friesland, a hamlet in Súdwest-Fryslân, Friesland, the Netherlands

=== North America ===
==== Canada ====
- Strand Fiord Pass, a pass on Axel Heiberg Island, Nunavut, Canada

==== United States ====
- Strand, Iowa
- Grand Strand, a stretch of beaches in North and South Carolina
- Silver Strand (San Diego), or The Strand, a narrow isthmus connecting Coronado Island with Imperial Beach, California
- Strand National Historic Landmark District, a neighborhood in Galveston, Texas
- The Strand (bicycle path), a pedestrian/bike path along the coast of the South Bay, Los Angeles

== Art, entertainment, and media ==
=== Music ===
- The Strand (band), a British hard rock band that evolved into the Sex Pistols
- Strand (album), by the Spinanes, 1996
- Strand Records, an American budget label, a subsidiary of a company founded in 1958 by Jack Kent Cooke

=== Periodicals ===
- The Strand, a publication of Victoria University in the University of Toronto
- The Strand Magazine, a British monthly founded in the 1890s (named after the street in London)

=== Other art, entertainment, and media ===
- Strand (film), a 2009 Iranian film
- The Strand (radio), a daily BBC World Service arts programme
- Victor Strand, a character in Fear the Walking Dead
- T. K. Strand, a character in 9-1-1: Lone Star
- The New York Times Strands, an online word game

== Biology ==
- Coding strand, a strand of DNA
- A strand of hair

== Brands and enterprises ==
- Strand (cigarette), a 1950s/1960s brand of cigarette notorious for its failed advertising campaign, "You're never alone with a Strand"
- Strand Bookstore, a famous bookstore in New York City
- Strand Cinema, art deco cinema in Belfast, Northern Ireland
- Strand Hotel (also known as The Strand), a colonial-style hotel in Yangon, Myanmar
- Strand Lighting, a company supplying lighting equipment to the entertainment industry
- Strand Publishing, a publishing company based in Sydney, Australia; publisher of books by Grenville Kent
- Strand Releasing, a theatrical distribution company based in Culver City, California
- The Strand (Providence theater), a live music venue and theater in Providence, Rhode Island

== Other uses ==
- Strand (programming language), a parallel programming system
- Strand (surname)
- Strand, part of an electrical cable
- Strand (mathematics), part of a knot as meant in the definition of tricolorability

== See also ==
- Strand Church (disambiguation)
- Strand station (disambiguation)
- Strand Theatre (disambiguation)
- Stranded (disambiguation)
- Strandloper (disambiguation)
