= Solna strand metro station =

Stockholm Metro station

Solna strand
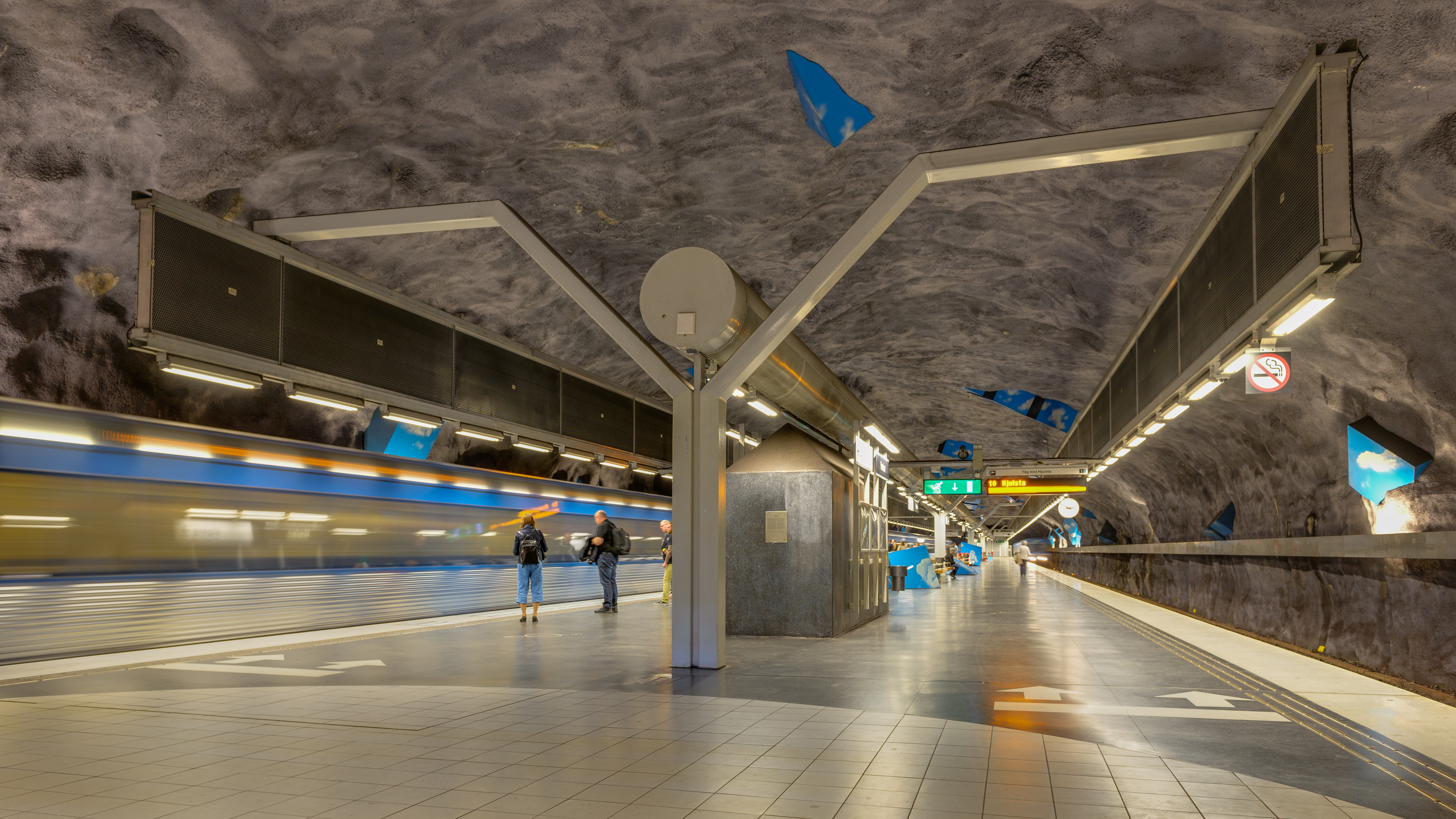
- Platform

General information
- Location: Huvudsta, Solna
- Coordinates: 59°21′15″N 17°58′26″E
- Elevation: 8.4 m (28 ft) under sea level
- System: Stockholm Metro station
- Owner: Storstockholms Lokaltrafik
- Platforms: 1 island platform
- Tracks: 2

Construction
- Structure type: Underground
- Depth: 28 m (92 ft) below ground
- Accessible: Yes

Other information
- Station code: SSD

History
- Opened: 18 August 1985; 41 years ago

Passengers
- 2019: 4,500 boarding per weekday

Services
Preceding station	Stockholm Metro	Following station
Huvudsta towards Kungsträdgården	Line 10	Sundbybergs centrum towards Hjulsta
Location
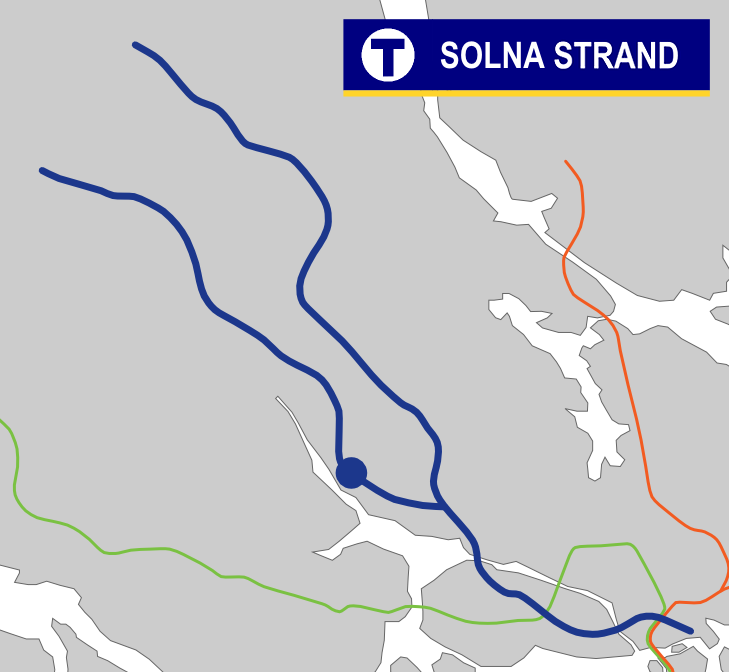

Solna strand (known as Vreten until 18 August 2014) is a subway station on the Blue Line of the Stockholm Metro. It was opened on 18 August 1985 as part of the extension between Västra skogen and Rinkeby and is located in the Huvudsta region of the Solna Municipality. The platform is located in bedrock, 28 m (92 ft) below ground level under Vretenvägen. The entrance is in the north end at Korta gatan. The station's theme is defined by artwork created by the Japanese-Swedish sculptor Takashi Naraha in 1985 called Himmelen av kub (The heaven of cube).

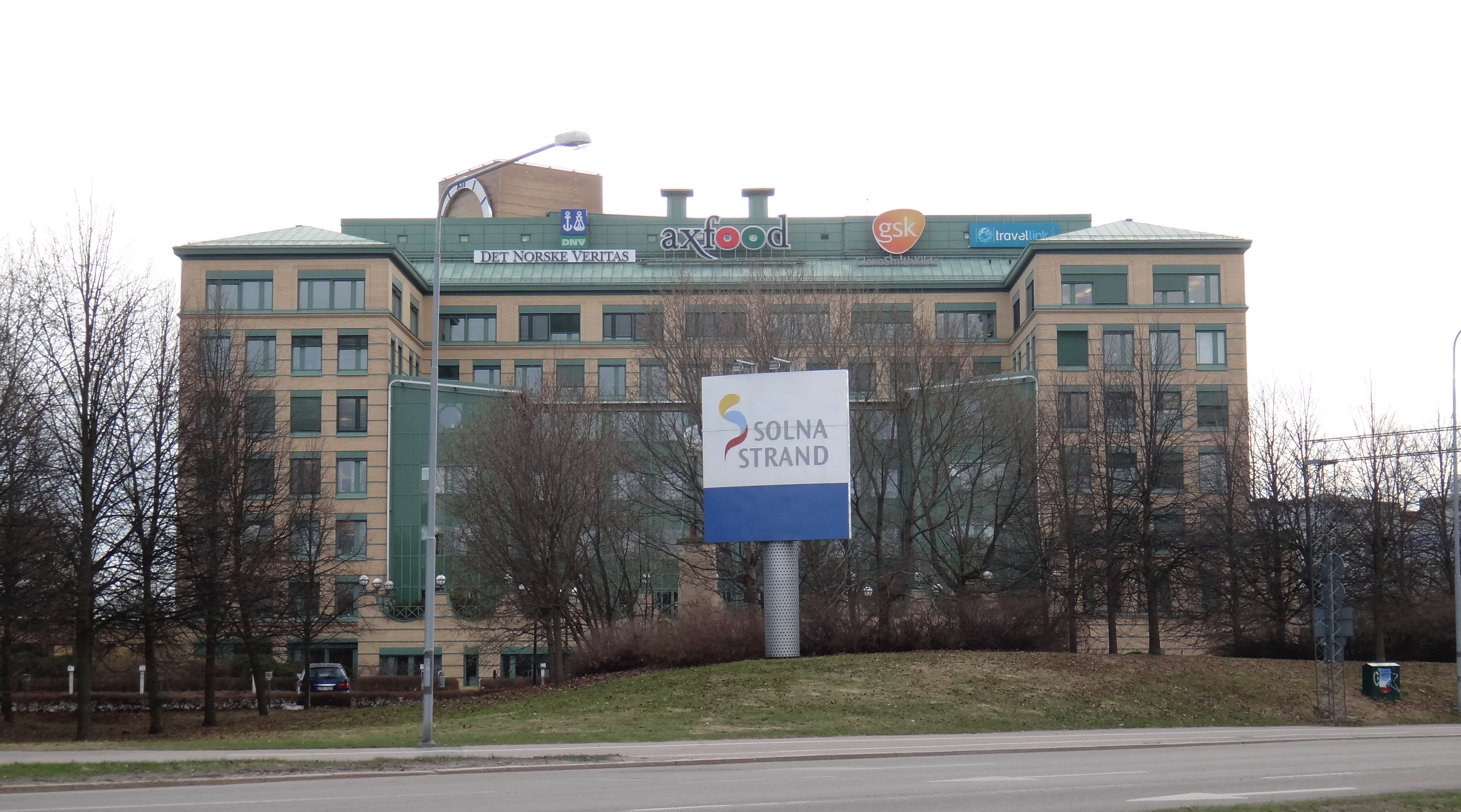
An office building in Solna strand

It is located in and named after Solna Strand, a former industrial area on the shore of Lake Mälaren that has since developed into an area of office buildings. Organisations here include the Swedish Tax Authority, Hewlett-Packard and Axfood. There is also a power plant by the coast. Until 2014 the area was called Vretens industriområde (Vreten industrial area), after the farmstead called Vreten which was located here in the 19th century. Solna Business Park is located across the Mälaren Line railway to the north, and the Sundbyberg Municipality districts Lilla Alby and Central Sundbyberg are located to the west.

== Gallery ==
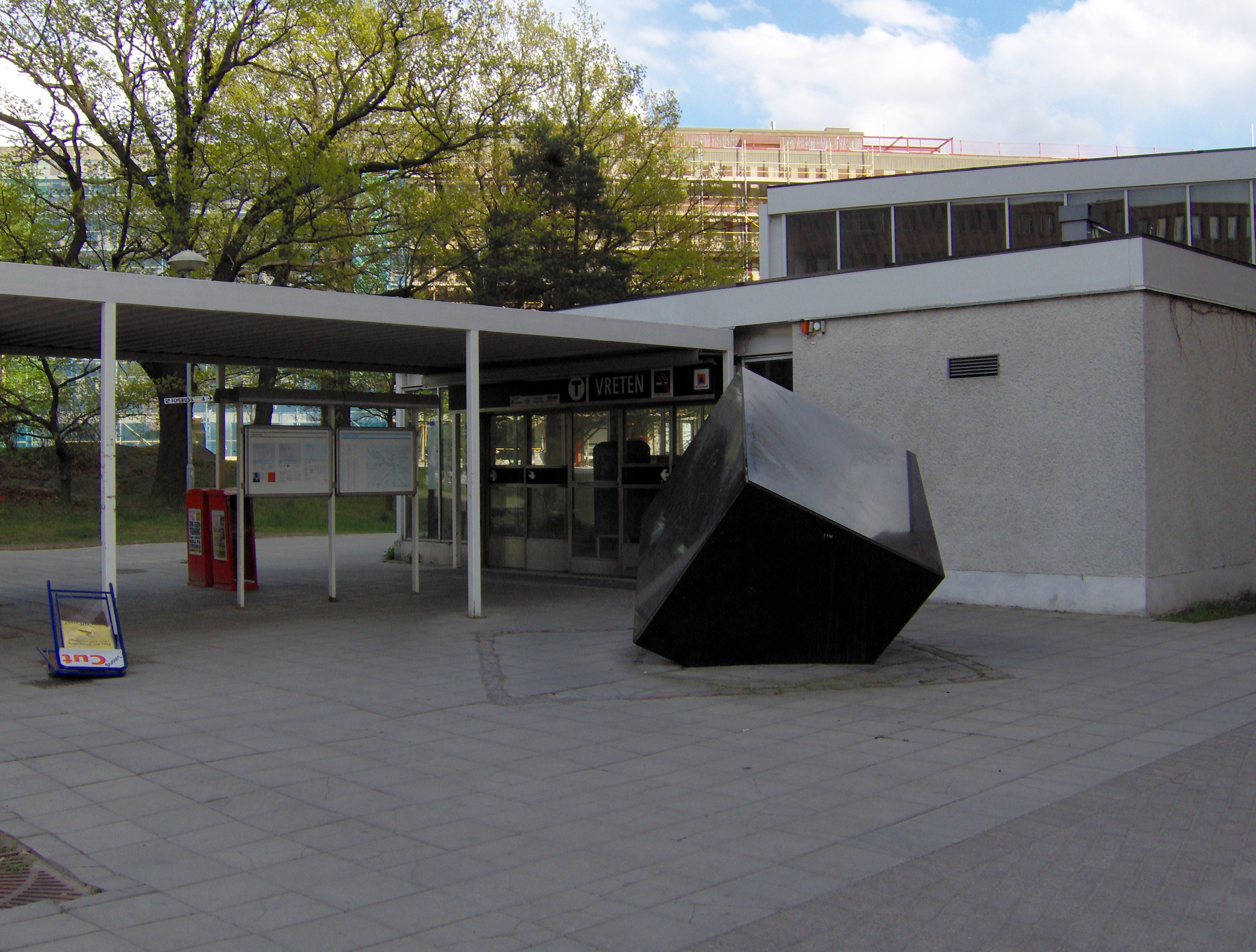
Entrance

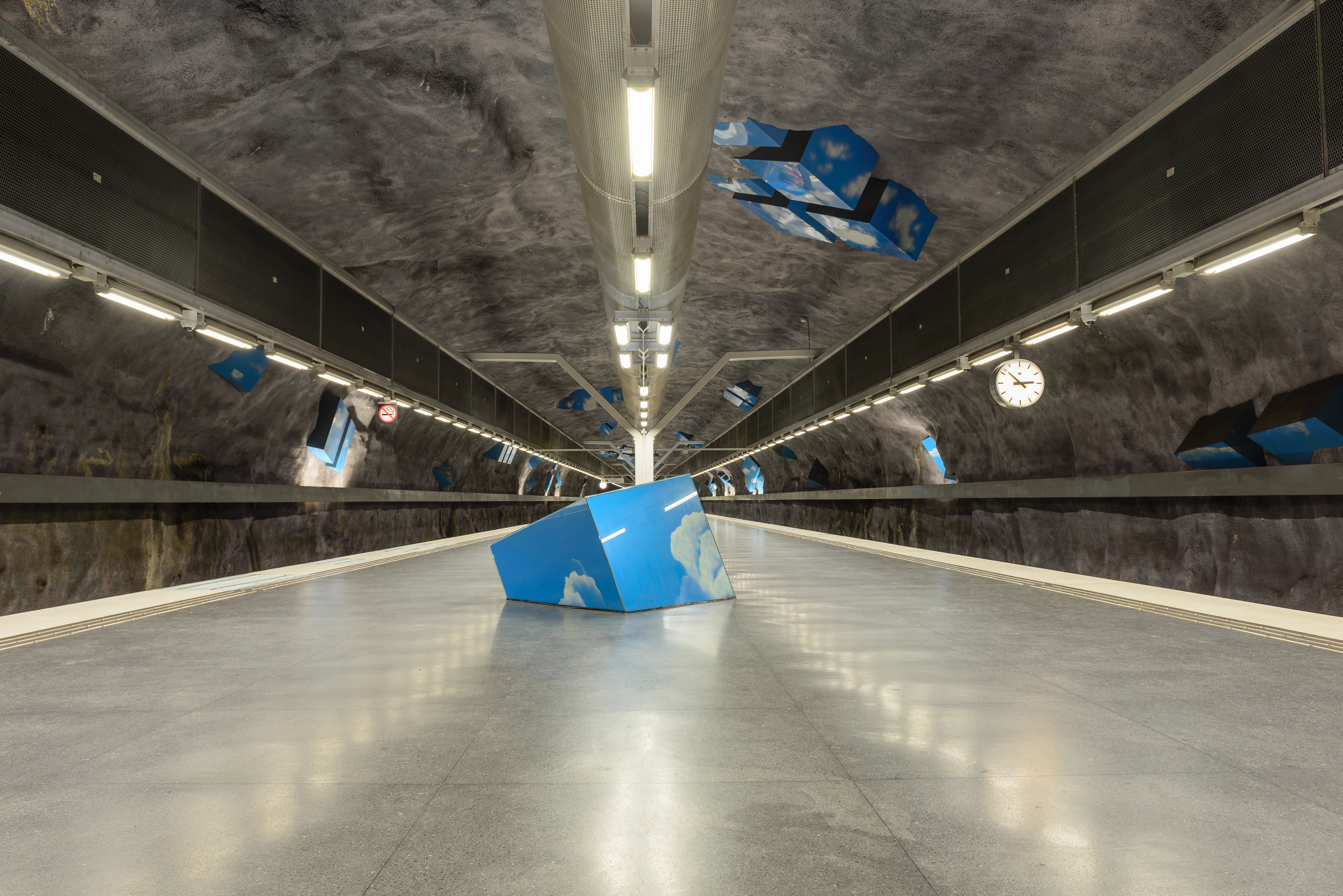
Artwork on the platform
