= Stranded =

Stranded may refer to:

== Music ==
=== Albums and EPs ===
- Stranded (album), a 1973 album by Roxy Music
- Stranded, a 1990 album by Tangier
- Stranded, a 1992 EP by Konkhra
- (I'm) Stranded, a 1977 album by Australian rock group The Saints
  - "(I'm) Stranded" (song), a single from the album

=== Songs ===
- "Stranded" (Heart song), 1990
- "Stranded" (Lutricia McNeal song), 1998
- "Stranded" (Plumb song), 1999
- "Stranded" (Van Morrison song), 2005
- "Stranded (Haiti Mon Amour)", a 2010 song by Jay-Z, Bono, Rihanna and the Edge
- "Stranded", a song by Rainbow from the album Bent Out of Shape, 1983
- "Stranded", a song by Royal Hunt from the album Land of Broken Hearts, 1992
- "Stranded", a song by 'No Fun At All' from the album Out of Bounds, 1995
- "Stranded", a song by Alien Ant Farm from the album ANThology, 2001
- "Stranded", a song by Saybia from the album These Are the Days, 2004
- "Stranded", a song by Agnes from the album Agnes, 2005
- "Stranded", a song by Gojira from the album Magma, 2016
- "Stranded", a 2000 song by Blue October
- "Stranded", a 2017 song by Flight Facilities, Broods, Reggie Watts, and Saro

== Television ==
- Stranded, a five-part survival miniseries by Les Stroud; see Survivorman
- Stranded (1986 film), a 1986 TV movie starring William Hickey
- Stranded (TV series), a 2013 paranormal reality series broadcast on Syfy
- Stranded with Cash Peters, a travel show
- "Stranded" (Jimmy Neutron episode)
- "Stranded" (The Outer Limits), a 1999 episode of The Outer Limits television series
- "The Stranded", the twenty-seventh episode of the sitcom Seinfeld
- The Stranded (TV series), a 2019 Netflix-series about a group of children stranded on an island after a tsunami

== Film ==
- Stranded (1916 comedy film), a silent film starring Oliver Hardy
- Stranded (1916 drama film), a silent film directed by Lloyd Ingraham
- Stranded (1927 film), a 1927 American film directed by Phil Rosen
- Stranded (1935 film), a drama directed by Frank Borzage and starring Kay Francis
- Stranded (1965 film), film directed by Juleen Compton
- Stranded (1987 film), a science fiction film starring Ione Skye
- Stranded (2001 film), a science fiction film starring Vincent Gallo and Maria de Medeiros
- Stranded (2002 film), a made-for-television drama based on Swiss Family Robinson
- Stranded (2002 action film), a direct-to-video action film a.k.a. Black Horizon, with Yvette Nipar
- Stranded (2005 film), a 2005 Australian short film
- Stranded (2007 film), a 2007 documentary of 1972 Andes plane crash survivors
- Stranded (2013 film), a science fiction/horror movie directed by Roger Christian and starring Christian Slater
- Stranded (2015 film), a 2015 comedy film directed by José Corbacho and Juan Cruz

== Other uses ==
- Stranded (painting), an 1898 painting by Alfred Munnings
- Stranded (video game), a 2003 video game or its sequel Stranded II
- Stranded: Alien Dawn, a 2023 video game
- Stranded: The Secret History of Australian Independent Music 1977–1991, a 1996 book by Clinton Walker

== See also ==
- Strand (disambiguation)
- Double-stranded
- Single-stranded
