= The Young Runaways =

The Young Runaways may refer to:

- The Young Runaways (1968 film), an American teen drama film
- The Young Runaways (1978 film), an American made-for-television drama film
