= Strand station =

Strand station may refer to:

- Strand Station, a former railway station in Bærum, Norway
- The Strand Station, a railway station in Auckland, New Zealand
- Aldwych tube station, a former Underground station in London, England, named Strand until 1915
- Charing Cross tube station, an Underground station in London, England, named Strand from 1915 to 1973

== Other stations with "Strand" in the name ==
=== Denmark ===
- Amager Strand Station, a metro station in Copenhagen
- Brøndby Strand station, an S-train station in Copenhagen
- Gammel Strand Station, a metro station in Copenhagen
- Solrød Strand station, an S-train station in Copenhagen

=== England ===
- Barrow-in-Furness Strand railway station, in Barrow-in-Furness
- Bootle New Strand railway station, in Merseyside, sometimes called New Strand station

=== Netherlands ===
- Almere Strand railway station, a former railway station in Almere
- Hoek van Holland Strand metro station, a rapid transit station outside of Rotterdam

=== Sweden ===
- Farsta strand metro station, in Stockholm
- Farsta strand railway station, a commuter rail station in Stockholm
- Hässelby strand metro station, in Stockholm
- Solna strand metro station, in Stockholm

=== Elsewhere ===
- Lübeck-Travemünde Strand station, in Travemünde, Germany
- Rosslare Strand railway station, in County Wexford, Ireland
- Zeebrugge-Strand station, in Bruges, Belgium

== See also ==
- Strand tube station (disambiguation)
- Strand (disambiguation)
