= The Night They Took Miss Beautiful =

- Television poster
- Genre: Mystery
- Written by: George Lefferts
- Story by: Lou LaRose
- Directed by: Robert Michael Lewis
- Starring: Chuck Connors; Sheree North
- Theme music composer: Walter Murphy
- Country of origin: United States
- Original language: English

Production
- Executive producers: Don Kirshner; Merrill Grant
- Producer: George Lefferts
- Cinematography: Jules Brenner
- Editors: Les Green; Robert L. Swanson
- Running time: 100 minutes
- Production companies: Don Kirshner Productions; La Rose Productions Ltd.

Original release
- Network: NBC
- Release: October 24, 1977

The Night They Took Miss Beautiful is a 1977 American made-for-television drama film appearing on the NBC network that was produced by Don Kirshner. The film features a large number of stars in a story about "skyjacking beauty queens" on a Consolidated PBY Catalina. The passengers include five beauty pageant contestants, their entourage, and a secret agent carrying a vial of a secret and highly fatal biological warfare toxin that if opened can cause a pandemic.

== Plot ==
Following a Miss Universe-style contest in Miami, Florida, the five semi-finalists are flown to Nassau, Bahamas in a flying boat along with the American contestant's stage mother; the group's escort, Kate Malloy (Stella Stevens); Miss Beautiful Master of Ceremonies Marv Barker (Phil Silvers) and a deadheading pilot, Paul Fabiani (Gary Collins).

At the airport, no one notices two men in flight mechanic's coveralls board the aircraft and conceal themselves. The two, members of a Symbionese Liberation Army-type revolutionary terrorist group, hijack the aircraft, killing the co-pilot when he attempts to send a warning over the radio. The surviving pilot lowers the aircraft to 200 feet to avoid radar and lands on a small uninhabited island that has World War II-vintage buildings. What the two terrorists do not know is that a deadly contagious nerve agent is aboard.

Awaiting the kidnapped passengers is Layla Burden (Sheree North), de facto leader of the terrorists who will kill the captives one by one until a $5 million ransom is paid.

Back at the small Miami airport the flying boat left from, security manager Mike O'Toole (Chuck Connors) meets two government agents, who are not from the Federal Bureau of Investigation but from an unnamed government agency with higher authority. The two agents are accompanied by several soldiers wearing American combat uniforms without insignia carrying automatic weapons.

Mike is shocked that the government agents not only have no intention of paying the ransom, but will instead get a fix on their position from the next radio transmission of their demands and launch an airstrike to kill the lot of them, including the hostages. Mike concludes that the captive's only hope rests with him.

== Cast ==
- Chuck Connors as Mike O'Toole
- Gary Collins as Paul Fabiani
- Henry Gibson as Rolly Royce
- Peter Haskell as Damon Faulkner
- Karen Lamm as Cindy Lou Barrett
- Sheree North as Layla Burden
- Victoria Principal as Reba Bar Lev, Miss Israel
- Gregory Sierra as Omar Welk
- Phil Silvers as Marv Barker
- Stella Stevens as Kate Malloy
- Rosanne Katon as April Garland, Miss Virgin Islands
- Jonathan Banks as Buck
- William Bassett as Smitty
- Marcia Lewis as Mrs. Barrett
- Burke Byrnes as Barney Jessup
- Paul Kent as Director
- Marguerite Steele as Miss India

== Production ==
The Night They Took Miss Beautiful featured a Consolidated PBY Catalina, a flying boat that dates back to the 1930s and 1940s. It was used as a patrol, reconnaissance and night bomber during World War II.

== Reception ==
The Night They Took Miss Beautiful was not critically reviewed, but People in its "Picks and Pans" review was succinct: "Terrorists hold a planeload of beauty pageant finalists for ransom in this TV movie starring Phil Silvers, Stella Stevens, Sheree North and Chuck Connors. Better they should keep them."

In a later 2007 DVD release, The Night They Took Miss Beautiful was bundled with The Woman Hunter, a 1972 made-for-television mystery film.
