= Huvudstabron =

Bridge in Stockholm, Sweden

Coordinates: 59°21′1″N 17°58′22″E

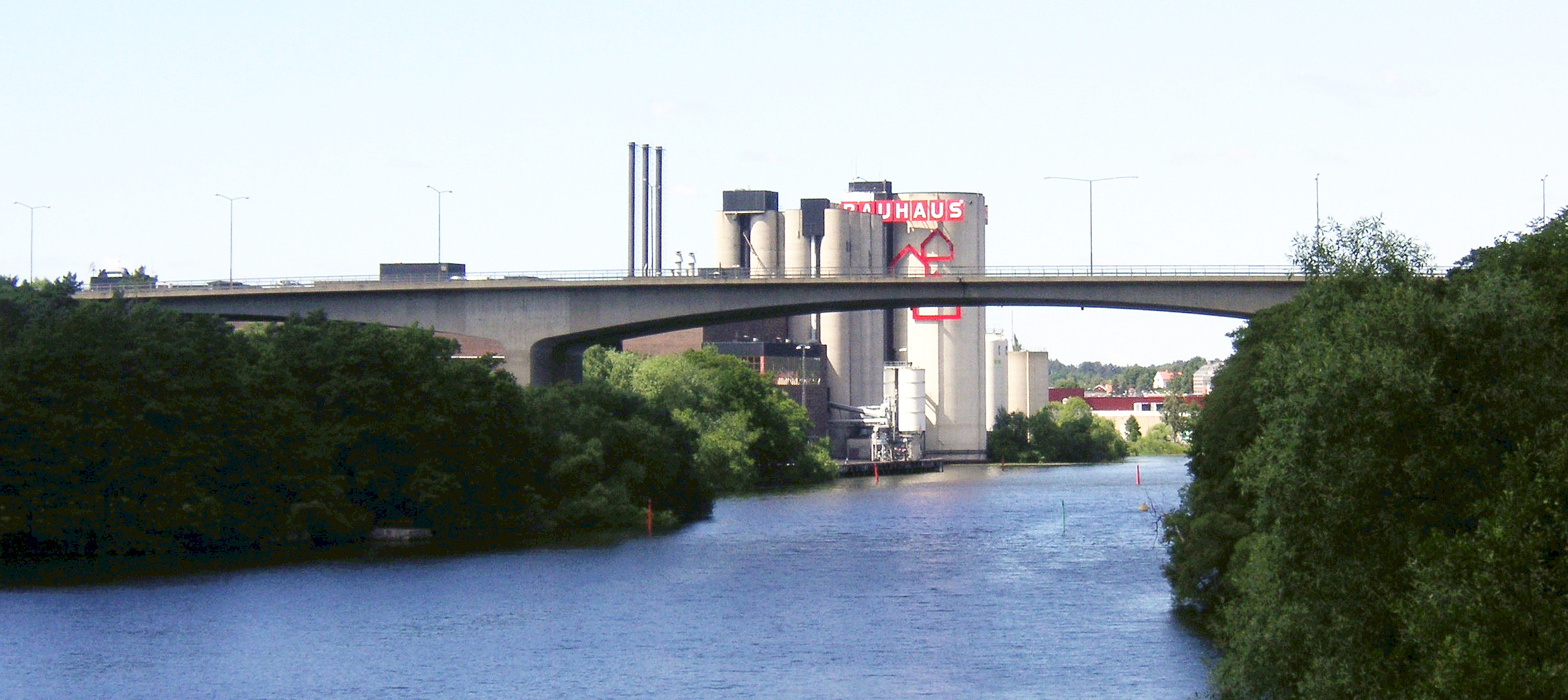
Huvudstabron

Huvudstabron (Swedish: "The Huvudsta Bridge") is a bridge in Sweden. Stretching over Bällstaviken it connects the industrial area Ulvsunda in the municipality Stockholm to the city district Huvudsta in the municipality Solna.

I first bridge at the location was put forward in the 1930s, but was never realized until the general plan of 1960 when plans for the never realized arterial road Huvudstaleden was being discussed. Huvudstabron was built 1964–67 as a first stage in the project.

It is a pre-stressed concrete structure, 286 metres in length with six spans of which the central passing over the strait below is the longest with a span of 100 metres; it is 28.2 metres wide with two 3 metres wide footways separated from the roadway by railings; and a horizontal clearance of 24 metres.

== See also ==
- List of bridges in Stockholm
- Västerbron
- Ekelundsbron
- Tranebergsbron
