= The Plastic Dome of Norma Jean =

1966 American independent film directed by Juleen Compton

- Directed by: Juleen Compton
- Written by: Juleen Compton
- Produced by: Stuart Murphy
- Starring: Sharon Henesy; Robert Gentry; Marco St. John; Sam Waterston; Skip Hinnant; Arthur Hughes; Henry Oliver
- Music by: Michel Legrand
- Release date: 1966
- Running time: 82 minutes
- Country: United States
- Language: English
- Budget: $125,000

The Plastic Dome of Norma Jean is a 1966 independent film about a young psychic woman whose powers are exploited by a boy band, directed by Juleen Compton. It was written by Compton and filmed in the Ozark mountains, and was the feature film debut of Sam Waterston. The film was shown at Cannes, which awarded the film as part of its International Female Week series, and at the San Francisco International Film Festival.

== Synopsis ==
Norma Jean and her friend Vance go to pick up a large wooden crate that Norma Jean ordered through a catalog and drive it to an empty lot on the side of the road to figure out what to do with the large plastic dome inside. Vance suggests Norma Jean touch the dome to get one of her prescient “feelings." She does so, hearing music before a group of three men arrive in a car playing instruments (“Poor Boy”). She touches each of the men in turn, using her clairvoyance to learn the men’s names: Andy, Francis, and Bobo. The men agree to help Norma Jean and Vance set up the dome so their band can play inside. As Norma Jean, Andy, and Francis explore the surrounding woods, they encounter a tramp. Meanwhile, a cave-in traps a man in a nearby cave.

The group drives Norma Jean and Vance’s truck through Table Rock advertising the show, but the first performance is a flop. Bobo gets the idea to use Norma Jean’s clairvoyance as a draw, while Vance is resistant to the idea. Eventually, Norma Jean agrees, and during the first performance an audience member becomes extremely distressed while Norma Jean uses her preternatural ability to “read” the woman’s pocket watch. At a later performance, Norma Jean collapses after having a vision of a body hanging in a well. At the cave-in, a man volunteers to go crawl inside to look for the survivors, but becomes trapped himself.

After Norma Jean’s vision, the mayor of Table Rock shows up to the dome, concerned over reports of her visions. Upon interrogating her, the sheriff guesses the location of the well in Norma Jean’s vision, and they discover the woman with the pocket watch hanged herself inside. Norma Jean is distraught, but Bobo is insistent that they continue the performances, as he has set up a corporation so the group can make money off her abilities. Norma Jean continues her performances, but falls ill from the toll of the visions (“Norma Jean”). Vance and Norma Jean conspire to run away, and Norma Jean hides herself in a junkyard. There, she befriends the tramp they met in the woods, who introduces himself as Christopher Montague Forsythe. While playing with a rabbit in the junkyard, Norma Jean and Chris are attacked by a pair of men who hit Chris over the head and chase Norma Jean away.

Afterwards, the men realize Norma Jean is the missing psychic and tell the mayor and sheriff that they saw a Chris attacking her. Vance goes to the junkyard to help Norma Jean, but the two men, the mayor, and the sheriff arrive as well. When they see Norma Jean trying to help an injured Chris, they mistakenly believe he is attempting to kidnap her; the sheriff fires his gun at them, shooting Norma Jean, and she dies in Vance’s arms.

== Cast ==
- Sharon Henesy as Norma Jean, a young woman whose psychic abilities cause her to see visions when she touches objects and people
- Robert Gentry as Vance, Norma Jean's boyfriend
- Marco St. John as Bobo, the leader of a band who tries to exploit Norma Jean's abilities
- Sam Waterston as Andy, a member of Bobo's band
- Skip Hinnant as Francis, a member of Bobo's band
- Arthur Hughes as Chris, a tramp who Norma Jean befriends

== Production ==
The Plastic Dome of Norma Jean was filmed on location in the Ozarks and was financed entirely by Juleen Compton, who had made some money in real estate while working in film. It was the feature film debut of actor Sam Waterston, who portrayed Andy. The character Norma Jean was named after Marilyn Monroe; according to Compton, the film depicts the dangers of fame for a young woman.
