= Västra skogen metro station =

Stockholm Metro station

Västra skogen
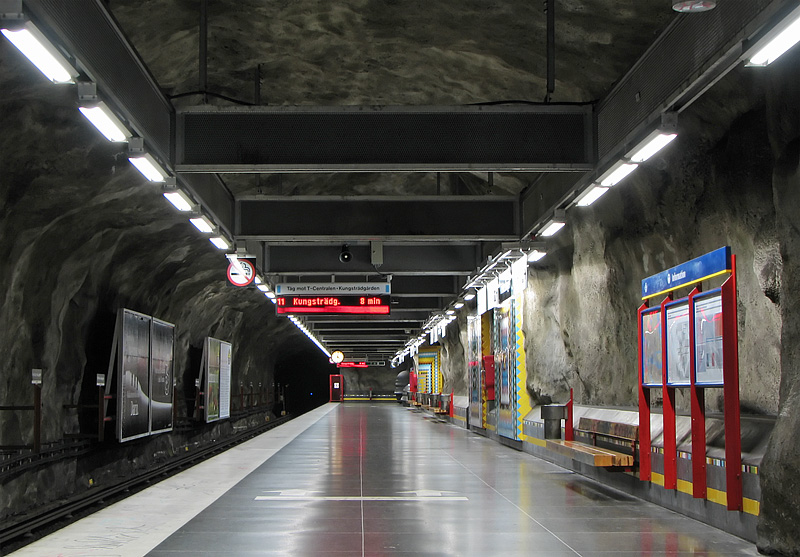

General information
- Location: Huvudsta, Solna
- Coordinates: 59°20′51″N 18°0′14″E
- Elevation: 3.3 m (11 ft) under sea level
- System: Stockholm Metro station
- Owner: Storstockholms Lokaltrafik
- Platforms: 2
- Tracks: 3

Construction
- Structure type: Underground
- Depth: 40 m (130 ft)
- Accessible: Yes

Other information
- Station code: VÄS

History
- Opened: 31 August 1975; 51 years ago

Passengers
- 2019: 7,850 boarding per weekday

Services
Preceding station	Stockholm Metro	Following station
Stadshagen towards Kungsträdgården	Line 10	Huvudsta towards Hjulsta
Stadshagen towards Kungsträdgården	Line 11	Solna centrum towards Akalla
Location
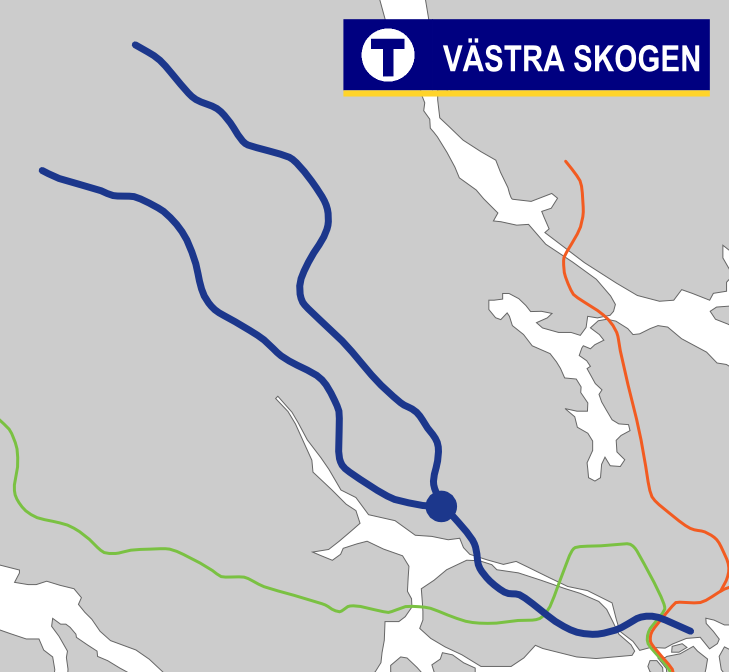

Västra skogen (Swedish: The Western Forest) is a station on the Blue Line of the Stockholm Metro, in Huvudsta, Solna Municipality. The station was opened on 31 August 1975 as part of the first stretch of the Blue Line between T-Centralen and Hjulsta. The trains were running via Hallonbergen and Rinkeby. On 18 August 1985 the extension to Rinkeby was opened, and the stretch between Hallonbergen and Rinkeby was closed for passenger traffic. It features one of the longest escalators in western Europe, 66 meters and with a vertical rise of 33 meters. This part of Huvudsta was earlier called Ingentingskogen (The Nothing Forest) after a small farm called Ingenting; the name Ingenting (Nothing) was suggested as a name for the new station, but rejected.

The station has three platforms, one for trains towards Hjulsta and Akalla, and two platforms towards Kungsträdgården, to allow trains from the two branches of the line to wait in the station before the two lines merge beyond the station.

== Gallery ==
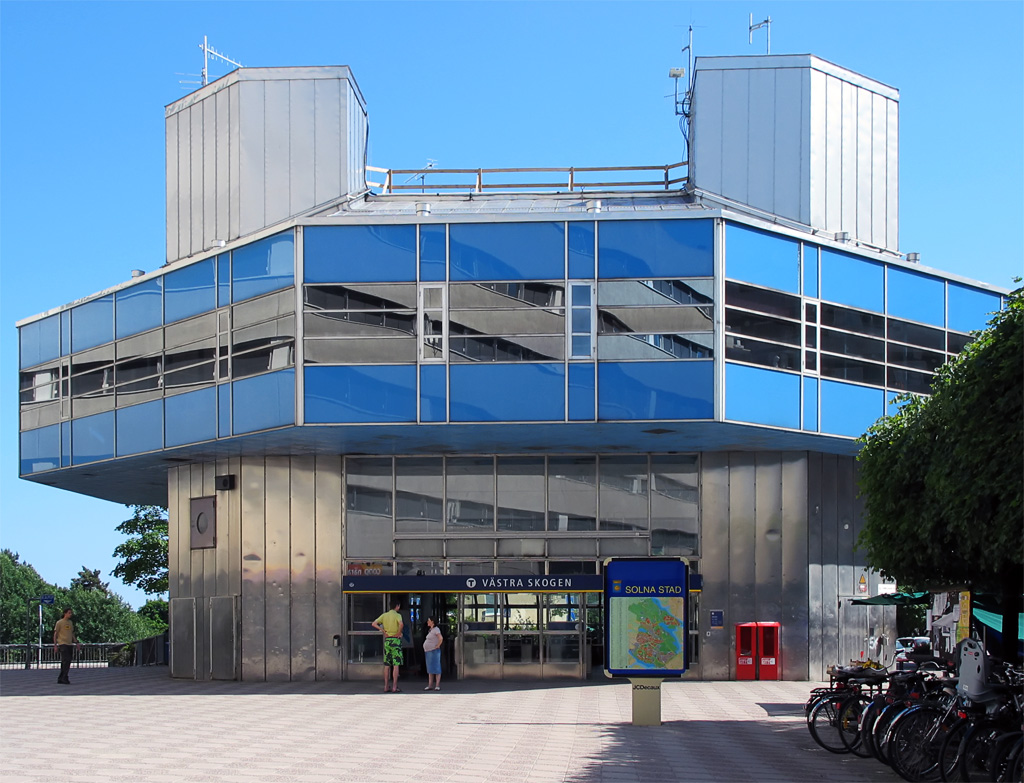
Entrance

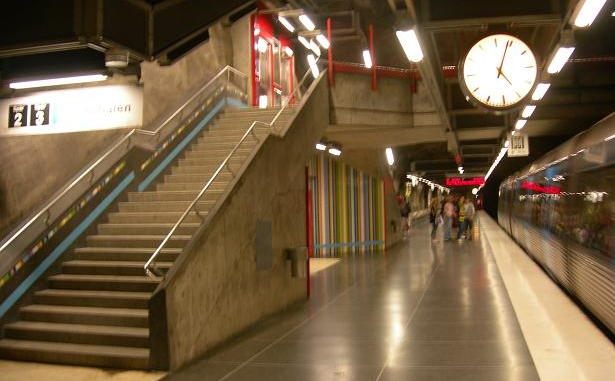
Platform and train

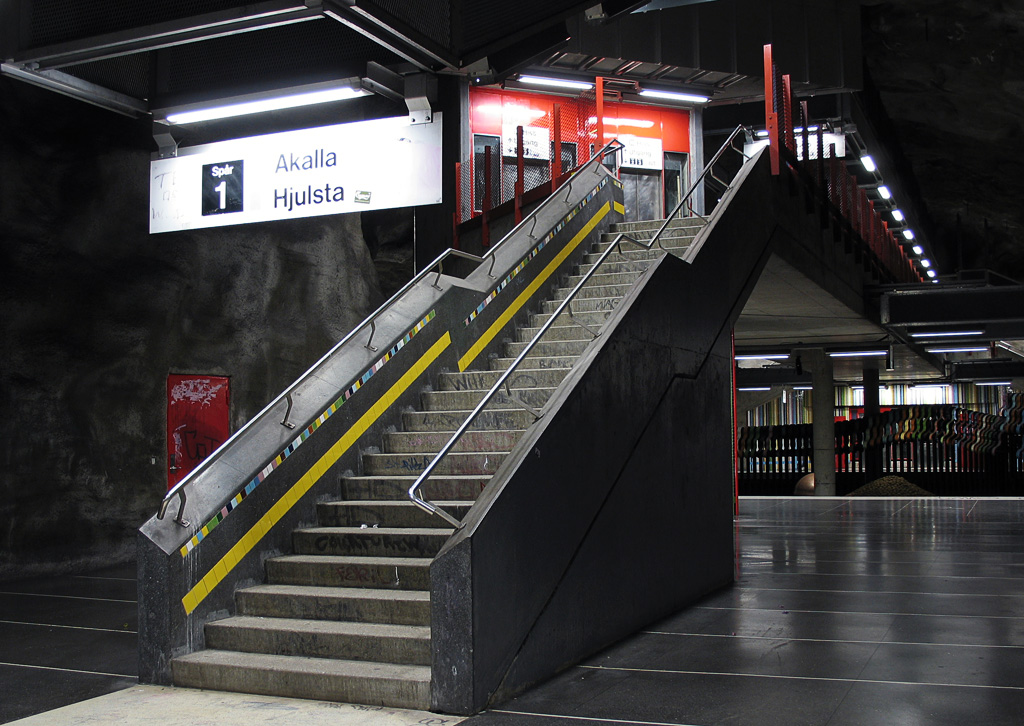
Platform stairs

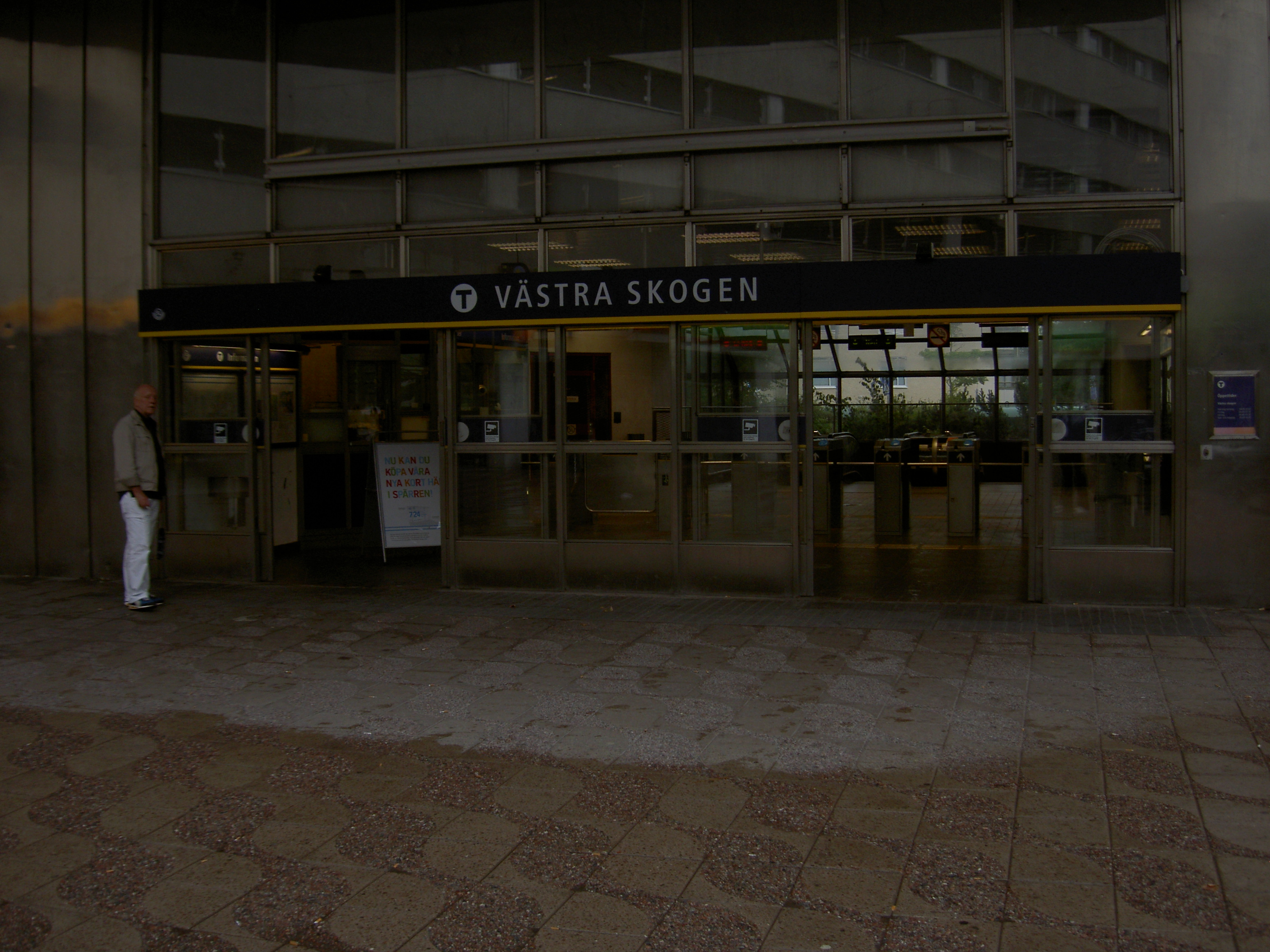
Entrance detail

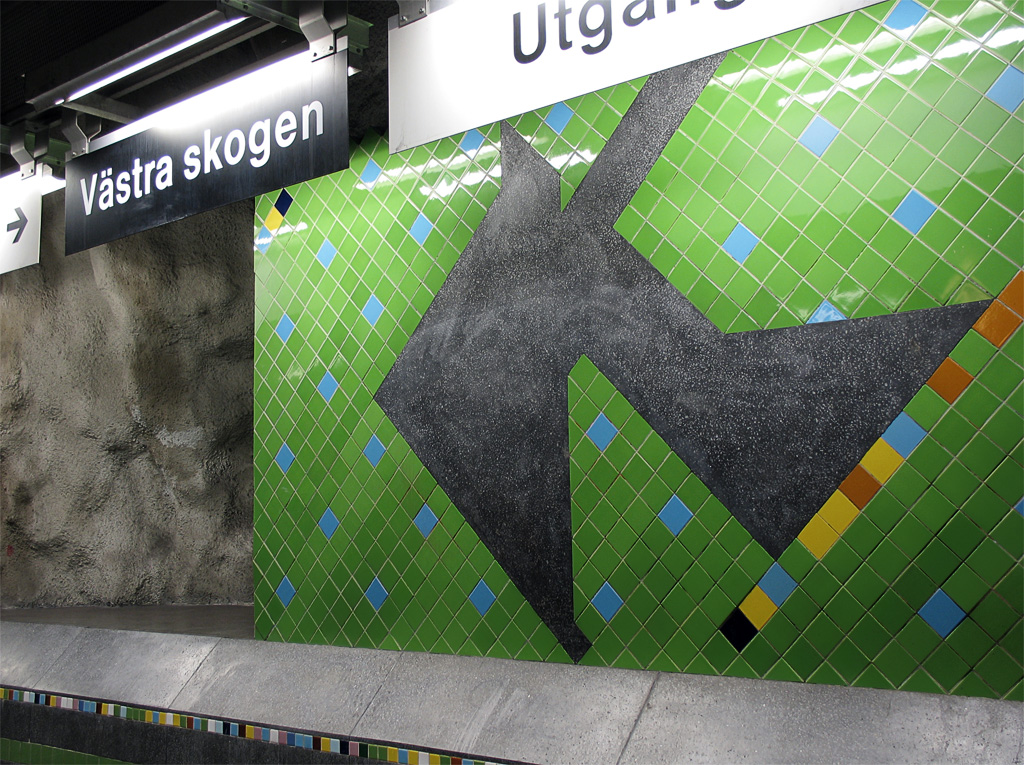
Station's artwork

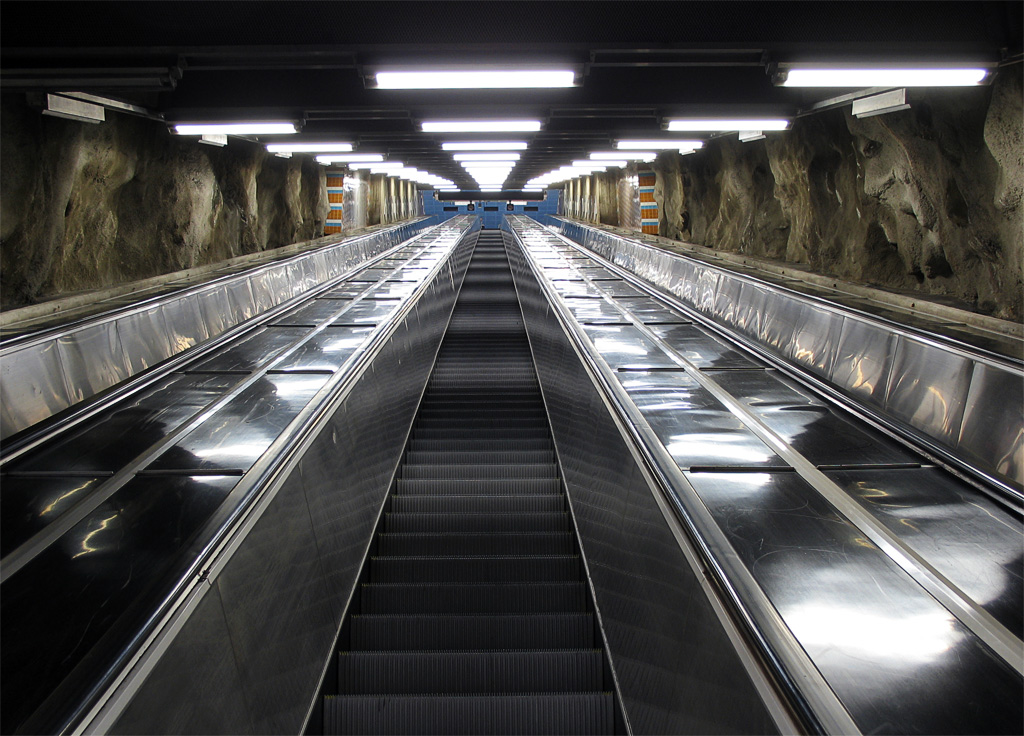
Escalators

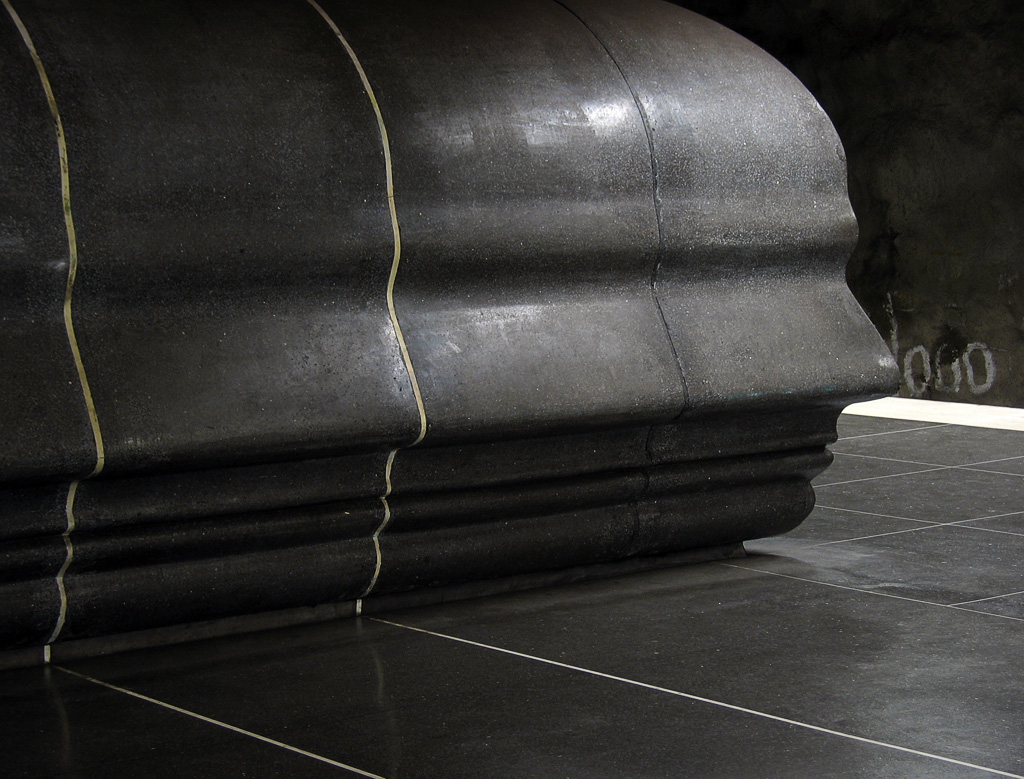

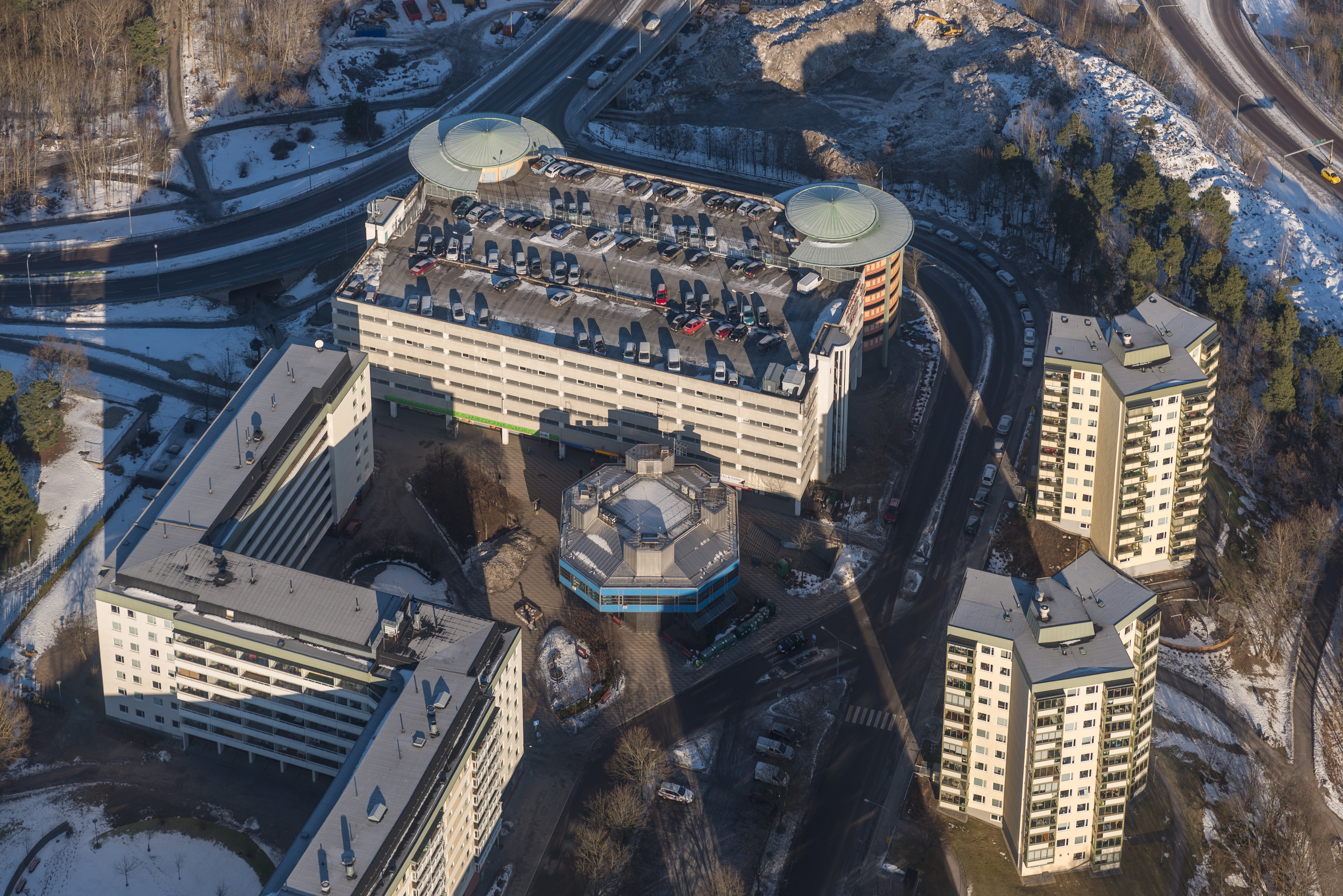
Bird's eye view of the station
