= Saints and Sinners (1962 TV series) =

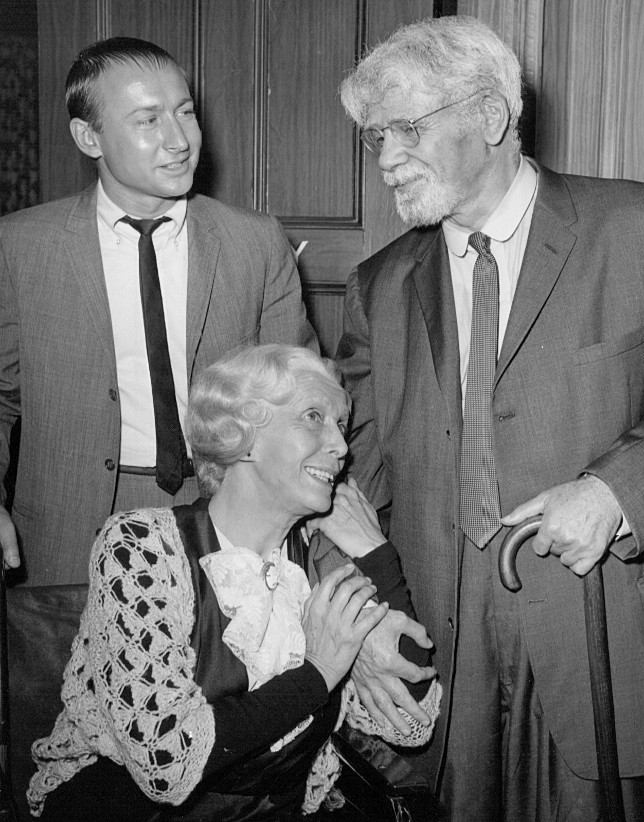
- Nick Adams, Lili Darvas and Paul Muni in "A Shame for the Diamond Wedding".
- Genre: Drama
- Created by: Adrian Spies
- Written by: David Davidson; David Karp; Jo Pagano; Adrian Spies
- Directed by: Jus Addiss; Marc Daniels; Sutton Roley; Paul Wendkos
- Starring: Nick Adams; John Larkin; Richard Erdman; Barbara Rush; Sharon Farrell; Robert F. Simon
- Theme music composer: Elmer Bernstein
- Country of origin: United States
- Original language: English
- No. of seasons: 1
- No. of episodes: 18

Production
- Producers: Marc Daniels; Adrian Spies
- Camera setup: Single-camera
- Running time: 60 mins
- Production companies: Four Star Productions; Hondo

Original release
- Network: NBC
- Release: September 17, 1962 – February 4, 1963

Related
- The Dick Powell Show

Saints and Sinners is an American television drama that was broadcast on NBC September 17, 1962 - January 28, 1963. The program starred Nick Adams as newspaper reporter Nick Alexander. Saints and Sinners was created by Adrian Spies, who worked as a journalist before becoming a screenwriter.

== Overview ==
The character of Nick Alexander was first featured in The Dick Powell Show episode "Savage Sunday". The series featured the staff of a fictional newspaper, The New York Bulletin. The episodes' storylines had adult themes that featured moral dilemmas.

== Cast ==
John Larkin co-starred as Nick's mentor, newspaper editor Mark Grainger. The series also starred Richard Erdman as Kluge, the staff photographer and office philosopher, and Robert F. Simon as copy editor Dave Tabak. Other cast members were Barbara Rush as Lizzie Hogan, Sharon Farrell as Polly, and Nicky Blair as Charlie.

== Guest stars ==
Many stars and future stars had guest roles on the show. One episode featured the final screen appearance of Paul Muni, one of the most esteemed actors in the history of Broadway and Hollywood.

- Philip Abbott
- Leon Askin
- Red Buttons
- Jack Albertson
- James T. Callahan
- Irene Dunne
- Sharon Farrell
- Tab Hunter
- Barbara Eden
- Ron Hagerthy
- Harvey Korman
- Robert Lansing
- Cloris Leachman
- Scott Marlowe
- Elizabeth Montgomery
- Paul Muni
- Mike Ragan
- Charles Ruggles
- Barbara Rush
- Frank Sutton
- William Tannen
- Lurene Tuttle
- Ray Walston
- Simon Scott

== Episodes ==
Episode #	Episode Title	Original Airdate
1	"Dear George, the Siamese Cat Is Missing"	September 17, 1962
2	"All the Hard Young Men"	September 24, 1962
3	"The Man on the Rim"	September 24, 1962
4	"Judgement in Jazz Alley"	October 8, 1962
5	"Source of Information"	October 15, 1962
6	"Three Columns of Anger"	October 22, 1962
7	"A Servant in the House of My Party"	November 5, 1962
8	"Daddy's Girl"	November 12, 1962
9	"Luscious Lois"	November 19, 1962
10	"A Shame for the Diamond Wedding"	November 26, 1962
11	"Judith Was a Lady"	December 3, 1962
12	"A Night of Horns and Bells"	December 24, 1962
13	"A Taste of Evil"	December 31, 1962
14	"The Home-Coming Bit"	January 7, 1963
15	"Slug It, Miss Joyous"	January 14, 1963
16	"The Year Joan Crawford Won the Oscar"	January 21, 1963
17	"New Lead Berlin"	January 28, 1963
18	"Ten Days for a Shirt Tail"	February 4, 1963

== Production ==
Saints and Sinners was a production of Four Star Television with Hondo Productions, filmed at Republic Studios in Studio City, California. Dick Powell was the executive producer, and Marc Daniels was the producer. Elmer Bernstein composed the music.

== Critical response ==
A review of the premiere episode in the trade publication Variety said that it was hampered by cliches that "had been established years ago in 'B' movies" and had been used in earlier TV shows. The review said that Adams's performance and some elements of the story were appealing, but they "as mixed by Spies seemed worn and tired".

== Reception ==
Saints and Sinners was broadcast on Mondays 8:30-9:30 p.m. Eastern Time. It faced competition from Chuck Connors' The Rifleman and Jack Lord's Stoney Burke on ABC and The Lucy Show and The Danny Thomas Show on CBS. Due to low ratings, it was canceled after 18 episodes.
