= Huvudsta metro station =

Stockholm Metro station

Huvudsta
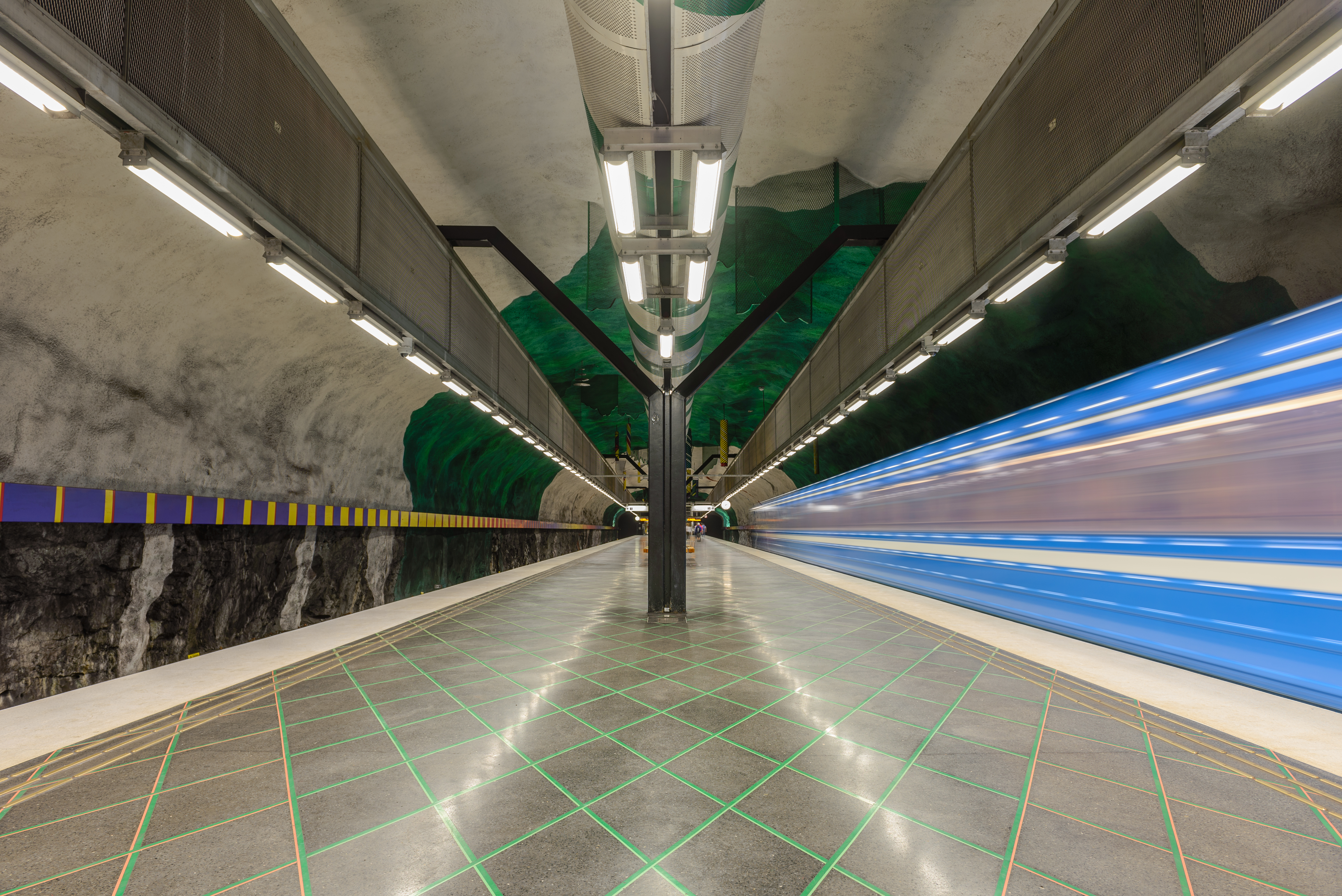

General information
- Location: Huvudsta, Stockholm
- Coordinates: 59°20′58″N 17°59′08″E
- Elevation: 4 m (13 ft) above sea level
- System: Stockholm Metro station
- Owner: Storstockholms Lokaltrafik
- Platforms: 1 island platform
- Tracks: 2

Construction
- Structure type: Underground
- Depth: 25 m (82 ft)
- Accessible: Yes

Other information
- Station code: HUV

History
- Opened: 18 August 1985; 41 years ago

Passengers
- 2019: 4,250 boarding per weekday

Services
Preceding station	Stockholm Metro	Following station
Västra skogen towards Kungsträdgården	Line 10	Solna strand towards Hjulsta
Location
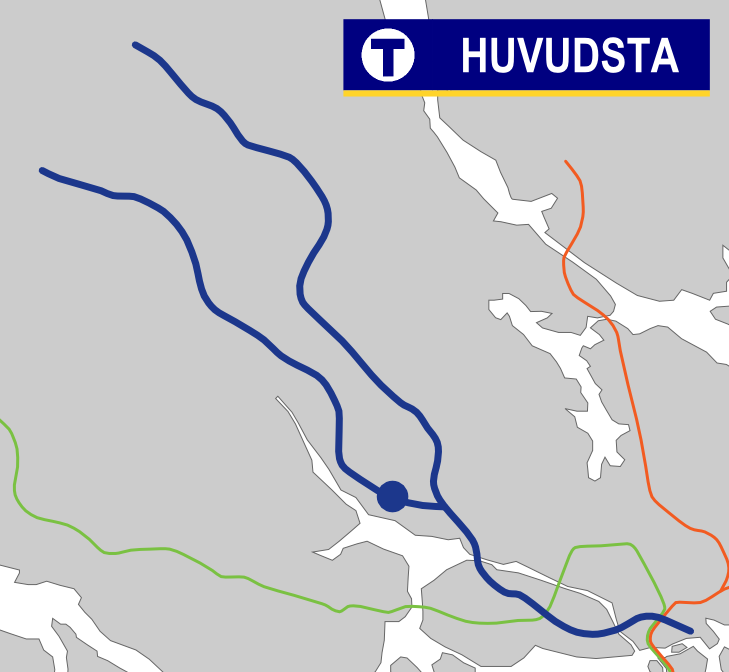

Huvudsta metro station is a station on the Blue Line of the Stockholm Metro, located in Huvudsta, Solna Municipality. The station was opened on 18 August 1985 as part of the extension between Västra skogen and Rinkeby. The distance to Kungsträdgården is 5.2 km (3.2 mi).

== Gallery ==
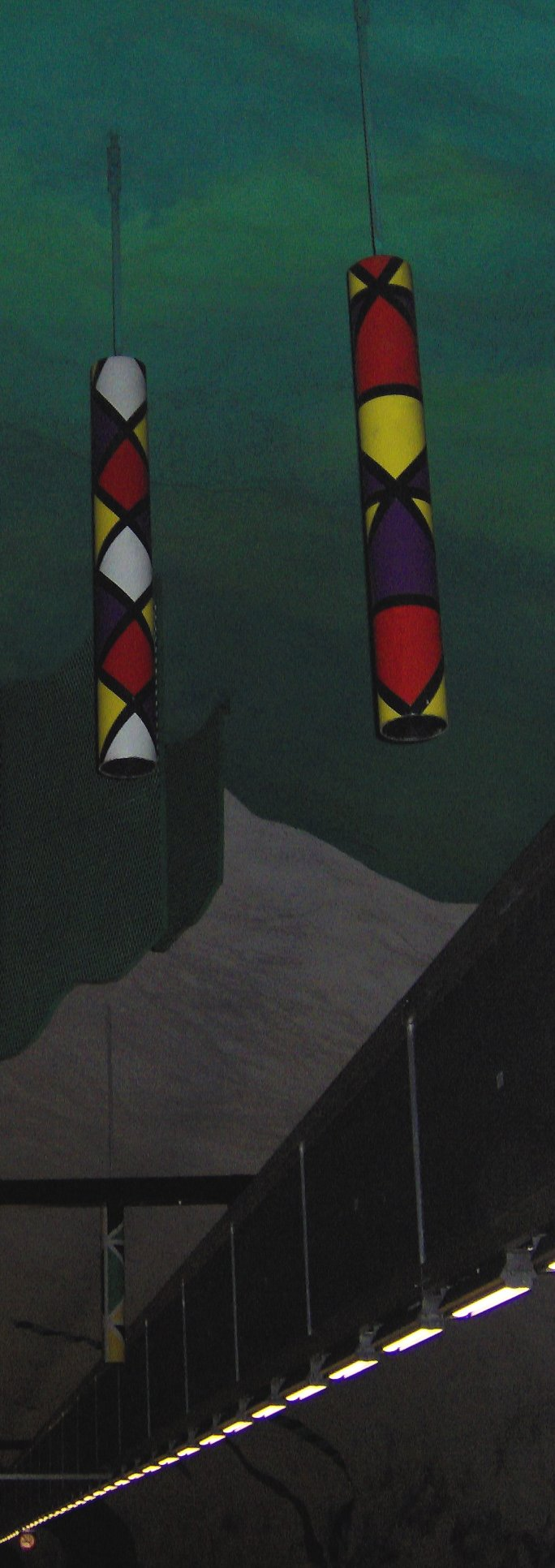
Artwork by Per Holmberg, 1985

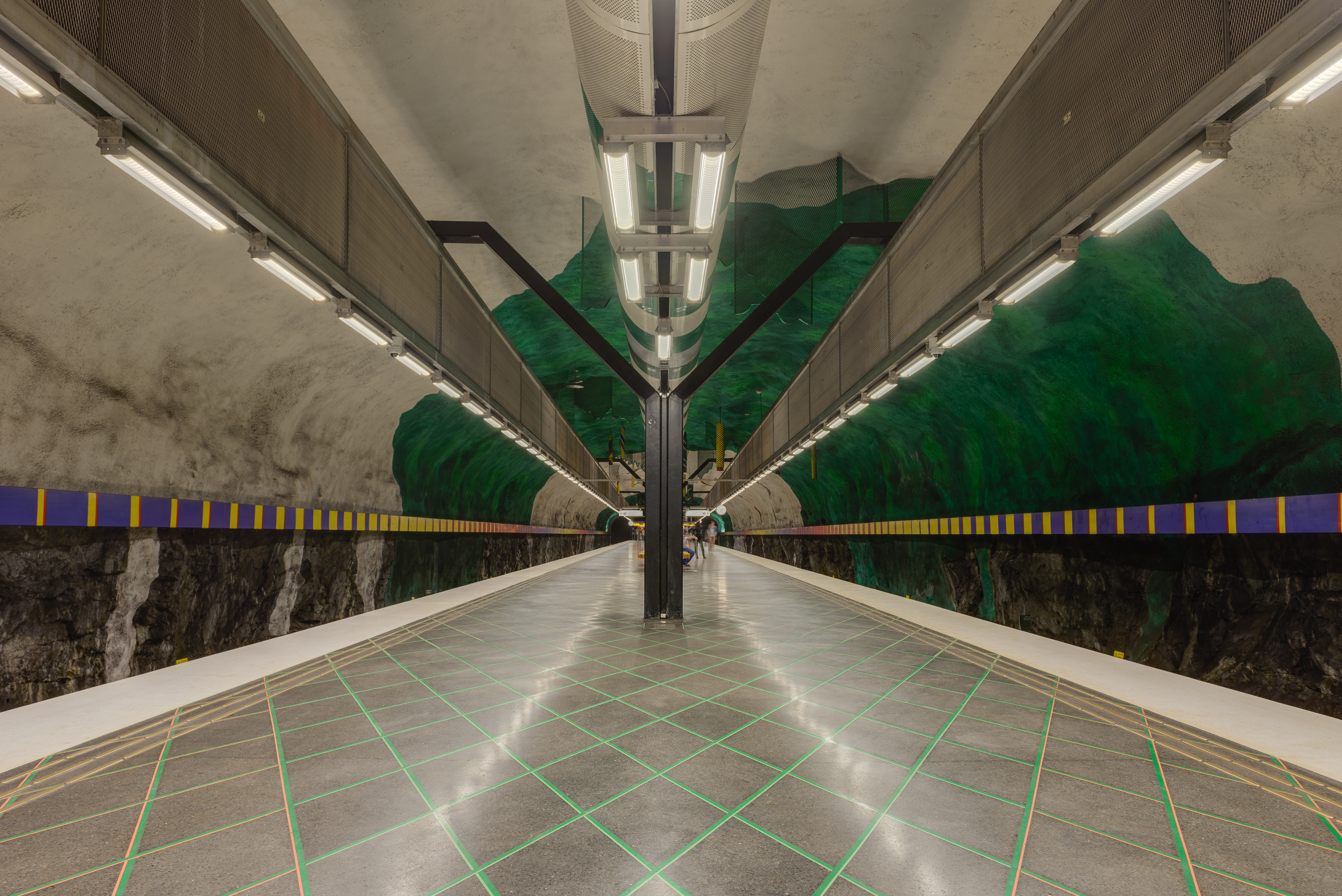
Platform with artwork on the tunnel walls
