= Sharon Farrell =

American actress (1940–2023)

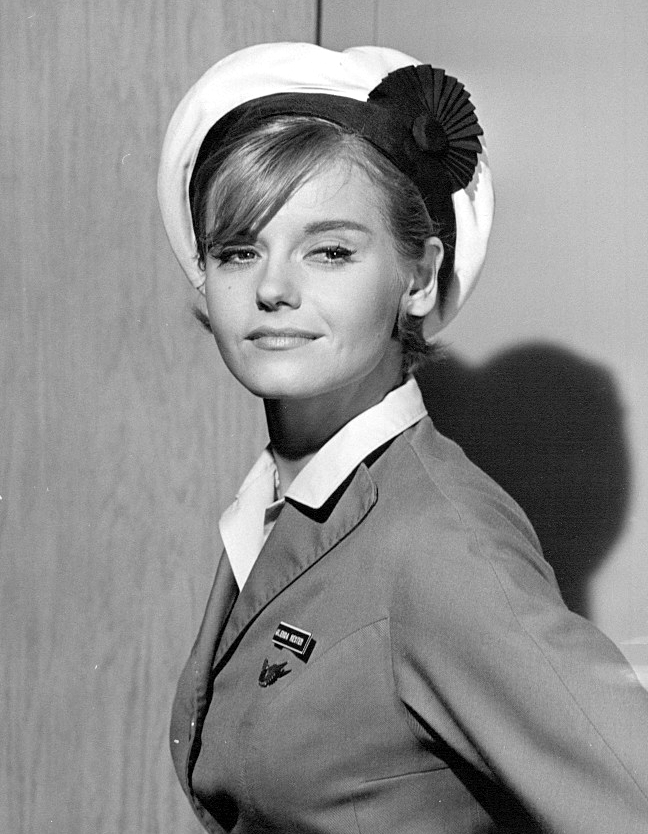
- Farrell in 1965
- Born: Sharon Lee Forsmoe; December 24, 1940; Sioux City, Iowa, U.S.
- Died: May 15, 2023 (aged 82); Orange County, California, U.S.
- Occupation: Actress
- Years active: 1959–1999; 2013–2014
- Spouses: Andrew Prine (m. 1962; ann. 1962) Ron DeBlasio (m. 1965; div. 1969) Steve Salkin (m. 1973; div. 1975) Dale Trevillion (m. 1974; div. 2006)
- Children: 1
- Parents: Darrel LaValle Forsmoe (father); Hazel Ruth Huffman Forsmoe (mother)

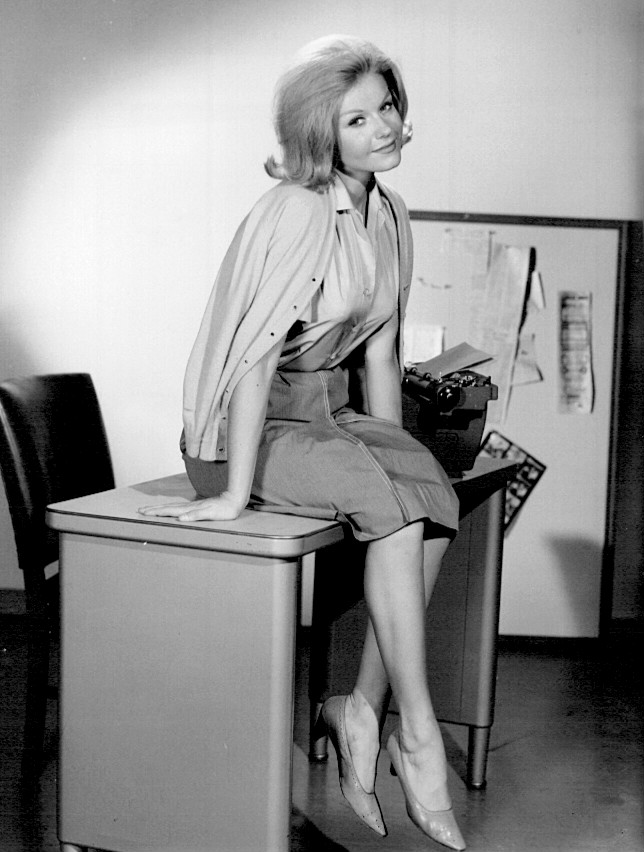
On TV's Saints and Sinners (1962)

Sharon Farrell (born Sharon Forsmoe, December 24, 1940 – May 15, 2023) was an American actress and dancer. Originally beginning her career as a ballerina with the American Ballet Theatre company, Farrell made her film debut in 1959 in Kiss Her Goodbye, followed by roles in 40 Pounds of Trouble (1962), and the neo-noirs A Lovely Way to Die (1968) and Marlowe (1969). She worked prolifically in television, including recurring parts in the series Saints and Sinners (1962), Dr. Kildare (1965), and Hawaii Five-O (1980).

Farrell's other roles include Larry Cohen's horror film It's Alive (1974), Dennis Hopper's drama film Out of the Blue (1980), and the teen comedy Can't Buy Me Love (1987). She continued to appear in television and film until 1999. In 2013, she reappeared in a minor role in the web series Broken at Love. Until her death in 2023, she was the last living Hawaii Five-O cast member.

== Early life ==
Born Sharon Forsmoe on Christmas Eve 1940 to Hazel Ruth (née Huffman) and Darrel LaValle Forsmoe in Sioux City, Iowa, she was of Norwegian descent and was raised with her sister, Dale Candice, in a Lutheran family. During her childhood, Farrell studied ballet and was involved in the theater department during high school. Farrell toured with the American Ballet Theatre Company as a dancer, which brought her to New York City.

== Career ==
Farrell made her acting debut at age 18 in the 1959 film Kiss Her Goodbye. She took her stage name from combining her surname and her father's given name Darrel, with "F" for Forsmoe and two "L"s.

From the 1960s to the 1980s, Farrell appeared in such films as The Reivers (1969), Marlowe (1969), It's Alive (1974), The Stunt Man (1980), Out of the Blue (1980), Night of the Comet (1984), and Can't Buy Me Love (1987).

In addition to film work, Farrell also appeared in guest roles on various television shows, including Death Valley Days, Gunsmoke, The Wild Wild West, The Man from U.N.C.L.E., I Dream of Jeannie, My Favorite Martian, The Beverly Hillbillies, The Alfred Hitchcock Hour, and Hawaii Five-O.

In 1991, she joined the cast of the long-running soap opera The Young and the Restless, remaining with the show until 1997. Farrell's last television role was in a 1999 episode of JAG.

Between 2013 and 2014, Farrell appeared in the web series Broken at Love, marking her first on-screen appearance in 14 years.

== Personal life and death ==
Farrell's first marriage was to actor Andrew Prine in 1962. They later divorced, reportedly after only living together for one month and ten days.

Farrell had one son, Chance Boyer, born when she was dating actor John F. Boyer. After Chance's birth in 1970, Farrell suffered an embolism that caused her heart to stop beating for four minutes. She incurred serious brain damage that resulted in memory loss and physical impairments. With the help of colleagues, Farrell worked to regain her abilities including her memory. She resumed her acting career, but for many years kept her illness a secret under the advice of friend and actor Steve McQueen who warned her that, if word got out, her career would be over.

Farrell was married to director Dale Trevillian for 32 years. In her autobiography Sharon Farrell: "Hollywood Princess" from Sioux City, Iowa, she claimed that she had romantic relationships with many famous people, including Che Guevara, Steve McQueen, and Bruce Lee.

Unreported until 5 August 2023, Farrell died on 15 May 2023, at the age of 82, possibly in Orange County, California, or Los Angeles Downtown Medical Center.

== Filmography ==
=== Film ===
Year	Title	Role	Notes
1959	Kiss Her Goodbye	Emily Wilson	
1962	40 Pounds of Trouble	Dolores	
1965	The Spy with My Face	Sandy Wister	
1968	A Lovely Way to Die	Carol	
1969	Marlowe	Orfamay Quest	
1969	The Reivers	Corrie	
1971	The Love Machine	Maggie Stewart	
1974	It's Alive	Lenore	
1976	The Premonition	Sheri Bennett	
1978	The Fifth Floor	Melanie	
1980	Out of the Blue	Kathy	
1980	The Stunt Man	Denise	
1981	Separate Ways	Karen Haskell	
1983	Sweet Sixteen	Kathy Hopkins	
1983	Lone Wolf McQuade	Molly McQuade	
1984	Night of the Comet	Doris	
1987	Can't Buy Me Love	Mrs. Mancini	
1989	One Man Force	Shirley	
1991	Lonely Hearts	Louise	
1993	Arcade	Alex's Mom	Video
1995	Beyond Desire	Shirley	
1995	A Gift from Heaven	Ma Samuels	
1996	Timeless Obsession	Mrs. Sparrow	
1997	Last Chance Love	Mrs. Worthington	

=== Television ===
Year	Title	Role	Notes
1961	Naked City	Actress (uncredited)	Episode: "The Hot Minerva"
1962	Alfred Hitchcock Presents	Lolly Wilkens	Episode: "The Matched Pearl"
1962	Wagon Train	Judy	Episode: "The Orly French Story"
1962–1963	Saints and Sinners	Polly Holloran	12 episodes
1963	Empire	Lisa Barry	Episode: "Stopover on the Way to the Moon"
1963	My Favorite Martian	Gloria Trimble	Episode: "There Is No Cure for the Common Martian"
1963	Death Valley Days	Cara Franklin	Episode: "The Holy Terror"
1963	Kraft Suspense Theatre	Althea Winton	Episode: "Are There Any More Out There Like You?"
1963	The Lieutenant	Pam Canford	Episode: "Alert"
1963	Ben Casey	Michael Ann Bowersox	Episode: "The White Ones Are Dolphins"
1963	Gunsmoke	Lottie; Belle	Episode: "With a Smile"; Episode: "Quint's Trail"
1964	Arrest and Trial	Angela	Episode: "Onward and Upward"
1964	Wagon Train	Pearlie Garnet	Episode: "The Pearlie Garnet Story"
1964	Bob Hope Presents the Chrysler Theatre	Melissa	Episode: "A Slow Fade to Black"
1964	Gunsmoke	Annie	Episode: "Trip West"
1964	Burke's Law	Libby Hale	Episode: "Who Killed the Surf Broad?"
1964	The Alfred Hitchcock Hour	Melanie Rydell	Episode: "The Second Verdict"
1964	Dr. Kildare	Jeanne Sawyer	Episode: "Night of the Beast"
1964	The Man from U.N.C.L.E.	Sandy Wister	Episode: "The Double Affair"
1964	Ben Casey	Ellen Hardin	Episode: "For a Just Man Falleth Seven Times"
1965	Ben Casey	Penny Carson	Episode: "The Day They Stole County General"
1965	The Alfred Hitchcock Hour	Rosie	Episode: "Final Performance"
1965	The Beverly Hillbillies	Kitty Devine	Episode: "The Movie Starlet"
1965	The Fugitive	Elvie	Episode: "Corner of Hell"
1965	Rawhide	Billie Lou	Episode: "Hostage for Hanging"
1965	I Dream of Jeannie	Nina Ferguson	Episode: "The Yacht Murder Case"
1965	My Three Sons	Cathy	Episode: "My Son, the Ballerina"
1965	Dr. Kildare	Glenda Hester; Rachel Field	3 episodes
1966	The Wackiest Ship in the Army		Episode: "Girl in Polka-Dot Swimsuit"
1966	Run for Your Life	Jenny; Louise	Episode: "The Night of Terror"; Episode: "The Sex Object"
1966	The Man from U.N.C.L.E.	Leslie Stemmler	Episode: "The Minus-X Affair"
1967	Iron Horse	Carrie	Episode: "The Pembrooke Blood"
1967	The Man from U.N.C.L.E.	Jacqueline Midcult	Episode: "The Pieces of Fate Affair"
1967	The Virginian	Mavis	Episode: "Execution at Triste"
1968	The Wild Wild West	Cloris Colton	Episode: "The Night of the Amnesiac"
1968	Insight		Episode: "Look Back to the Garden"
1968	Premiere	Joan Mears	Episode: "Lassiter"
1969	The Name of the Game	Jesse Boone	Episode: "A Hard Case of the Blues"
1970	Quarantined	Ginny Pepper	TV movie
1970	Medical Center	Linda Atwood	Episode: "Between Dark and Daylight"
1970	Men at Law	Donna Brooks	Episode: "Easy to Be Hard"
1971	The Name of the Game	Sandrelle	Episode: "LA 2017"
1971	Dr. Simon Locke	Maggie	Episode: "Target Ms. Blue"
1971	The D.A.	Georgia Young	Episode: "The People vs. Edwards"
1972	The Eyes of Charles Sand	Emily Parkhurst	TV movie
1972	Banyon	Wanda	Episode: "Meal Ticket"
1972	Marcus Welby, M.D.	Cecile Ramsey	Episode: "He Could Sell Iceboxes to Eskimos"
1973	The New Perry Mason	Pat Morrisey	Episode: "The Case of the Murdered Murderer"
1973	Police Story	Bobbie	Episode: "Requiem for an Informer"
1973	Wide World Mystery	Linda	Episode: "A Little Bit Like Murder"
1974	Wide World Mystery	Madeline Rivera	Episode: "The Cloning of Clifford Swimmer"
1974	Love, American Style	Sheila	Episode: "Love and the Flying Finletters"
1974	The F.B.I.	Lee Thomas	Episode: "The $20,000,000 Hit"
1974	Police Story	Bobbie	Episode: "The Hunters"
1974	Chase	Elaine	Episode: "Remote Control"
1974	Insight	Susan	Episode: "The Theft"
1974	The Underground Man	Marty Nickerson	TV movie
1974	Petrocelli	Arlene Johnson	Episode: "A Life for a Life"
1974	The Six Million Dollar Man	Angie Walker	Episode: "Stranger in Broken Fork"
1974	Police Woman	Marcia Gordon	Episode: "The Cradle Robbers"
1975	Emergency!	Catherine	Episode: "Smoke Eater"
1975	Harry O	Pauline	Episode: "For the Love of Money"
1975	Kolchak: The Night Stalker	Lila Morton	Episode: "Chopper"
1975	Police Story	Kathy Sherman	Episode: "The Execution"
1975	McCloud	Holly Dayton	Episode: "Showdown at Times Square"
1975	Bronk		Episode: "The Pickoff"
1976	Police Woman	Hallie	Episode: "The Death of a Dream"
1976	Gibbsville	Mildred	Episode: "Afternoon Waltz"
1978	Hawaii Five-O	Frankie Demara	
1978	Walt Disney's Wonderful World of Color	Mamma Doyle	Episode: "The Young Runaways"
1978	Match Game '78	Herself	5 Episodes
1978	Man from Atlantis	Charlene Baker	Episode: "Deadly Carnival"
1979	The Last Ride of the Dalton Gang	Flo Quick	TV movie
1979	Mrs. Columbo	Dorothy Hunt	Episode: "Falling Star"
1979-1980	Hawaii Five-O	Det. Lori Wilson	13 episodes
1980	Rage!	Dottie	TV movie
1981	Born to Be Sold	Joan Helick	TV movie
1983	T. J. Hooker	Irene Gordon	Episode: "Sweet Sixteen and Dead"
1983	Small & Frye	Rita	Episode: "The Case of the Street of Silence"
1984–1985	Rituals	Cherry Lane	TV series
1989	Freddy's Nightmares	Mrs. Wax	Episode: "Do You Know Where Your Kids Are?"
1991–1996	The Young and the Restless	Florence Webster	TV series
1992	Matlock	Rose Ballou	Episode: "The Abduction"
1993	Sworn to Vengeance	Sylvia Haskell	TV movie
1995	Yakuza Connection	Lois	TV movie
1999	JAG	Mary Hanratti	Episode: "Dungaree Justice"
2013–2014	Broken at Love	Grandma Geraldine	2 episodes
