= Juleen Compton =

American filmmaker, writer, and actress (born 1933)

- Born: 1933; Phoenix, Arizona, United States
- Occupation(s): Filmmaker, writer, actress

Juleen Compton (born 1933, Phoenix, AZ) is an American independent filmmaker, writer, and actor. She is best known for Stranded (1965) and The Plastic Dome of Norma Jean (1966), which she wrote, directed, and financed. She also starred in and distributed Stranded.

== Career ==
The Plastic Dome of Norma Jean won a special award at Cannes, as well as an award at the San Francisco Film Festival, and was screened at MoMA in 1970. She studied acting with Lee Strasberg, and performed in a production of Chekhov's The Cherry Orchard in 1955 and played the title role in a production of Jean Anouilh's Jeannette in 1960. She also originated the role of Fredrica in John Patrick's Broadway comedy Good As Gold in 1957, alongside Roddy McDowall and Zero Mostel, and played Myrrhina in a production of Lysistrata in 1959 that re-opened the East 74th Street Theater. The UCLA Film & Television Archive likens her work to that of the French New Wave. In 1974 she took part in the first Directing Workshop for Women at the American Film Institute. Compton also at one point began on a documentary of the history of women directors in Hollywood called Women in Action, "but there's no trace of it."

In the 1990s Compton moved to New York City to run the Century Center for the Performing Arts, an off-Broadway theater company. Compton's other writing credits include the TV movies Virginia Hill (1974), which starred Dyan Cannon and Harvey Keitel, and Women at West Point (1979). Her directing credits include Buckeye and Blue (1988). A script by Compton entitled Two Nice Girls is among a New York Public Library collection of scripts "produced, co-produced, or sponsored" by the New York Shakespeare Festival between 1972 and 1992.

In an article for The New Yorker in 2019, film critic Richard Brody, discussing Stranded, stated that with the film, Compton "places herself boldly in a tradition of director-stars that includes Charlie Chaplin and Erich von Stroheim, Orson Welles and Jacques Tati," as well as "Jean Seberg, Shirley MacLaine, and Judy Garland."

In February 2022, TIFF's Bell Lightbox Theater screened The Plastic Dome of Norma Jean as the first in its Midnight Madness screening series following closure due to the coronavirus pandemic.

== Personal life ==
She was married to director and drama critic Harold Clurman from 1960 until his death in 1980, according to some reports. In a 1979 interview in connection with a New York Times piece on Clurman's legacy, Clurman was Compton's "director and acting teacher," and their marriage "lasted anywhere from six months to five years; according to Miss Compton, there is still some question as to the legality of the divorce." According to a biography of Clurman's first wife, actress Stella Adler, Compton "never filed the papers [to divorce Clurman] and consequently inherited certain rights to his writings."

Compton has had a number of real estate dealings: in 1961, The New York Times profiled her on the occasion of her acquiring a $250,000 building on West Thirteenth Street with plans to turn it into a complex with theatres, a drama school, and a restaurant. The same article mentions she previously owned the East 74th Street Theater. A 1980 New York Times article on architecture mentioned that Compton owned a movie theater at 350 East 72nd Street, and that architect Philip Birnbaum was working on a project for her.

A 2019 Metrograph blog post by film critic Kristen Yoonsoo Kim stated: "Little is known about Compton now. By all accounts, she lives in the Hamptons and goes by the name Justine. Word has it that she dropped by previous Metrograph screenings of her films incognito."

In December 2019, Mexico's Museo Nacional de Arte acquired a 1956 portrait of Compton by Mexican artist Diego Rivera, which was given to the museum by Compton and her husband Nicholas Wentworth. It is possible a second portrait of Compton by Rivera exists, according to coverage by Mexican newspaper Excélsior. The Rivera portrait, along with a bust of Compton by Jacob Epstein, are mentioned as the two objects Compton kept across her many moves to different residences in a 1970 New York Times interview.

== Filmography ==
Year	Name	Director	Writer	Producer	Actress	Role	Notes
1965	Stranded	Yes	Yes	Yes	Yes	Raina	
1966	The Plastic Dome of Norma Jean	Yes	Yes	Yes			
1974	Virginia Hill		Yes				TV movie
1979	Women at West Point		Story				TV movie
1988	Buckeye and Blue	Yes					
