= Strand (surname) =

Strand is a surname. Notable people with the surname include:

- Andreas Strand (disambiguation)
- Anne Lilia Berge Strand, Norwegian artist and DJ
- Arne Strand, Norwegian journalist and politician for the Labour Party
- Asle Strand, Norwegian luger
- Athena Strand (2015–2023), American murder victim
- Brad Strand (born 1997), English professional boxer
- David Strand, American academic
- Embrik Strand (1876–1947), Norwegian zoologist, entomologist and arachnologist
- Ethan Strand (born 2002), American runner
- Hans E. Strand (1934–2000), Norwegian politician for the Conservative Party
- Harald Strand Nilsen (born 1971), Norwegian alpine skier
- Jack Strand (born 2004), American football player
- Joakim Strand, Finnish politician
- Johan Martin Jakobsen Strand (1873–1935), Norwegian farmer and politician for the Liberal Party
- John Strand, Founder and Owner of Black Hills Information Security. Author. Educator. Cybersecurity Thought Leader
- Kaj Aage Gunnar Strand (1907–2000), Danish astronomer
- Kjetil Strand, Norwegian handball player
- Knut Olaf Andreasson Strand (1887–1980), Norwegian politician for the Liberal Party
- Lars Iver Strand, Norwegian footballer
- Lars Ketil Strand (1924–2020), Norwegian forester
- Lasse Strand, Norwegian footballer
- Mark Strand (1934–2014), American poet, essayist and translator
- Morten Strand, Norwegian footballer and politician for the Conservative Party
- Odd Strand (1925–2008), Norwegian civil servant
- Olaf Strand (1899–1997), Norwegian middle distance runner
- Pål Strand, Norwegian footballer
- Paul Strand, an American modernist photographer
- Paul Strand (baseball) (1893-1974), American baseball player
- Petter Strand (born 1994), Norwegian footballer
- Richard Strand, an American linguist studying Afghanistan
- Roar Strand, Norwegian footballer
- Robert Ernest Strand, American farmer and politician
- Thomas Strand (born 1954), Swedish politician
- Tove Strand, Norwegian director and former politician for the Labour Party
- Wilhelm Strand (1892-1975), Norwegian footballer
- Christian Encarnacion-Strand (born 1999), American baseball player
- Erik Welle-Strand (1916–2001), Norwegian mining engineer and World War II resistance member

== Fictional characters ==
- Karl Strand, a character in Westworld
- Owen Strand, a character in 9-1-1: Lone Star
- Sam Strand, a character in Death Stranding
- T.K. Strand, a character in 9-1-1: Lone Star
- Victor Strand, a character in Fear the Walking Dead
