= Gary Collins (actor) =

American actor and TV host (1938–2012)

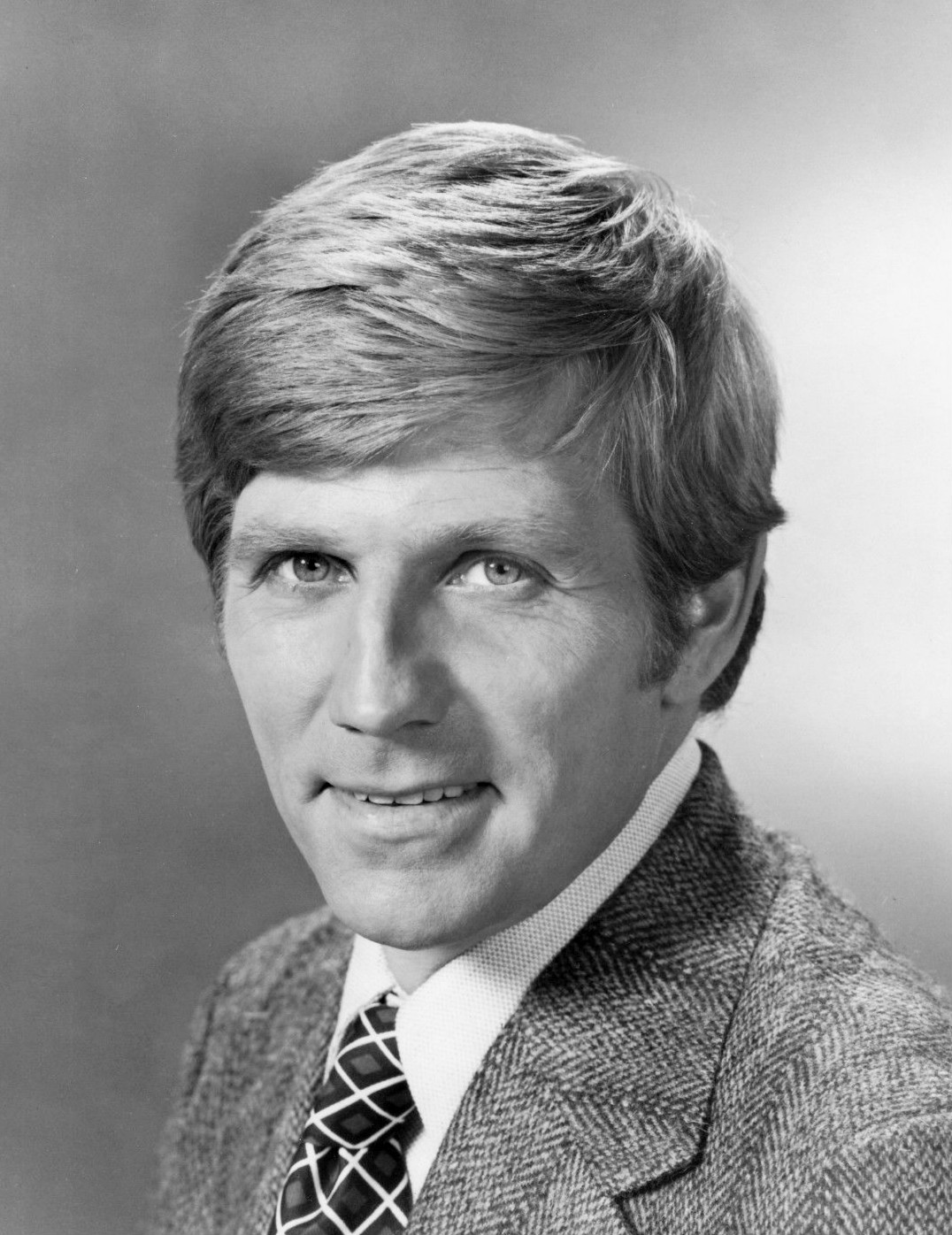
- Collins in 1972
- Born: Gary Ennis Collins; April 30, 1938; Los Angeles, California, U.S.
- Died: October 13, 2012 (aged 74); Biloxi, Mississippi, U.S.
- Resting place: Parkway Memorial Cemetery; Ridgeland, Mississippi, U.S.
- Education: Santa Monica College
- Occupations: Actor; television host
- Years active: 1962–2011
- Spouses: Susan Lachman (m. 1964; div. 1967); Mary Ann Mobley (m. 1967)
- Children: 3

Gary Ennis Collins (April 30, 1938 – October 13, 2012) was an American actor and television host. He won a Daytime Emmy Award in 1984 and received a star on the Hollywood Walk of Fame in 1985.

== Early life and education ==
Collins was born on April 30, 1938, in Los Angeles, and raised in the Venice neighborhood by a single mother, who was a waitress and factory worker. Collins attended Venice High School and graduated with the class of 1955. After attending Santa Monica Community College, he went into the United States Army.

== Early career ==
Collins enlisted in the Army and served in Europe, where he was a radio and television performer for the Armed Forces Network. After his return, he performed at the Barter Theatre, a year-round repertory theatre in Abingdon, Virginia, whose director Robert Porterfield provided chances for many aspiring actors.

== Film and television ==
Collins made a career in television, co-starring, with Jack Warden and Mark Slade, in the 1965 series The Wackiest Ship in the Army. He co-starred, with Dale Robertson and Robert Random, in the 1966–1968 series Iron Horse. He starred in the 1972 television series The Sixth Sense, in syndication part of Rod Serling's Night Gallery, as the parapsychologist and extrasensory perception-gifted Dr. Michael Rhodes. In 1974, he starred in the series Born Free, based on the life of George Adamson, a wildlife conservationist best known for his work with lions. Collins appeared in two episodes of Perry Mason: in 1965, he played assistant district attorney and defendant Larry Germaine in the 1965 episode, "The Case of the Fatal Fetish", and in 1966, he played murderer Alex Tanner in "The Case of the Crafty Kidnapper".

Collins guest-starred in dozens of television shows beginning in the 1960s, including The Virginian, The F.B.I., Hawaii Five-O, The Six Million Dollar Man, ALF, Alice, The Love Boat, The Bionic Woman, Charlie's Angels, Roots, Gimme a Break!, Friends, Vega$, Yes, Dear, JAG, and Dirty Sexy Money. Collins also appeared in an episode of Barnaby Jones titled "Deadly Reunion" (02/12/1976). He appeared in the episode "You're Not Alone" from the 1977 anthology series Quinn Martin's Tales of the Unexpected (known in the United Kingdom as Twist in the Tale). He also starred in three episodes of the British TV series Thriller; 'Only A Scream Away' (1973), 'The Double Kill' (1975) and 'Dial a Deadly Number' (1976). He is the only actor to have appeared in more than two episodes of Thriller during its three-year run.. Collins and his wife Mary Ann Mobley played Dr and Mrs. Diller on "The Love Boat" S2 E6 "Ship of Ghouls" (1978).

Collins also had many movie roles, including The Pigeon That Took Rome (1962), Angel in My Pocket (1969) also starring Andy Griffith, the original Airport (1970), Quarantined (1970), Houston, We've Got a Problem (1974), The Night They Took Miss Beautiful (1977), the horror thriller Killer Fish (1979), starring Lee Majors, Watchers Reborn (1998), and The Jungle Book: Search for the Lost Treasure (1998). He also played an American astronaut involved in a UFO coverup in the 1980 film Hangar 18.

Collins hosted the television talk show Hour Magazine from 1980 to 1988, and co-hosted the television series Home from 1989 to 1994. He was the host of the Miss America Pageant from 1982 to 1990. His wife Mary Ann Mobley and he replaced Bob Barker as co-hosts of the Pillsbury Bake-Off from 1984 to 1988.

== Awards ==
Collins was nominated for an Emmy Award six times and won in 1983 for Outstanding Talk Show Host. In 1985, he received a star on the Hollywood Walk of Fame.

== Personal life and death ==
Collins was first married to Susan Peterson, with whom he had two children. They divorced.

In 1967, Collins married Mary Ann Mobley, Miss America (1959). They had one child, a daughter. They separated in 2010, but reconciled soon after. He moved to her home state of Mississippi to be with her in 2012 while she battled breast cancer.

Collins died around 1:00 am on October 13, 2012, at Biloxi Regional Medical Center in Biloxi, Mississippi, of natural causes.

== Legal issues ==
The final decade of Collins's life was marred by several run-ins with the law. In January 2008, Collins served four days in jail in Glendale, California, for his second DUI conviction. He was arrested a year later, on January 31, 2009, in Santa Barbara County, California, and pleaded no contest to driving a motor home while drunk. Collins was then sentenced to 120 days home detention, according to a Santa Barbara County Sheriff's Office spokesperson. His blood alcohol content was measured at 0.29, more than three times the legal limit.

In November 2010, Collins was charged with a misdemeanor for leaving the scene of an accident in Jackson, Mississippi, and fined $500. On January 5, 2011, Collins was charged with defrauding an innkeeper, a felony, in Harrison County, Mississippi, for allegedly failing to pay his bill at Jazzeppi's Restaurant, according to a statement released by the Biloxi Police Department. Collins said the restaurant was taking too long to deliver his dinner, so he left and refused to pay the bill. The restaurant owner later said the arrest was due to a misunderstanding, and the charges against Collins were dropped.

== Filmography ==
Year	Title	Role	Notes
1962	The Pigeon That Took Rome	Major Wolff	
1962	King Kong vs. Godzilla	Submariner	Uncredited
1962	The Longest Day	Officer On Bridge	Uncredited
1965	Stranded	Bob	
1968	Ironside	Captain Larkin	Return of the Hero
1969	Angel in My Pocket	Art Shields	
1970	Quarantined	Dr. Larry Freeman	TV movie
1970	Airport	Cy Jordan	
1972	Getting Away from It All	Mark Selby	TV movie
1974	Houston, We've Got a Problem	Tim Cordell	TV movie
1977	Roots	Grill	TV miniseries (Part III)
1977	The Night They Took Miss Beautiful	Paul Fabiani	TV movie
1978	The Young Runaways	Lt. Ray Phillips	TV movie
1978	Fantasy Island	Bill Jordan	
1979	Killer Fish	Tom	
1979	The Kid From Left Field	Pete Sloane	TV movie
1980	The Secret of Lost Valley	Ned Harkness	TV movie
1980	Hangar 18	Steve Bancroft	
1981	Jacqueline Susann's Valley of the Dolls	Kevin Gilmore	TV miniseries
1986	Gimme a Break!	Himself	
1992	Secrets	Zack Taylor	TV movie
1994	Bandit Bandit	Governor Denton	TV movie
1998	Friends	Himself	Season 5, Episode 4
1998	Watchers Reborn	Gus Brody	
1998	The Jungle Book: Search for the Lost Treasure	Professor Warren Miller	
2000	Beautiful	Miss American Miss Host	
