= Quarantined (film) =

1970 American TV film

- Genre: Drama
- Written by: Norman Katkov
- Directed by: Leo Penn
- Starring: Gary Collins; John Dehner; Gordon Pinsent; Susan Howard; Dan Ferrone
- Theme music composer: George Duning
- Country of origin: United States
- Original language: English

Production
- Producer: Lou Merheim
- Cinematography: Howard Schwartz
- Running time: 74 minutes
- Production company: Paramount Television

Original release
- Network: ABC
- Release: February 24, 1970

Quarantined is a 1970 American TV movie starring Gary Collins, John Dehner, Gordon Pinsent, Susan Howard and Dan Ferrone. It was aired on February 24, 1970, as an ABC Movie of the Week.

== Plot ==
A group of doctors operating a medical clinic suddenly find themselves in a crisis that threatens to turn into an epidemic.

== Cast ==
- Gary Collins as Dr. Larry Freeman
- John Dehner as Dr. John Bedford
- Gordon Pinsent as Dr. Bud Bedford
- Susan Howard as Dr. Margaret Bedford
- Dan Ferrone as Dr. Tom Bedford
- Sharon Farrell as Ginny Pepper
- Wally Cox as Wilbur Mott
- Sam Jaffe as Mr. Berryman
- Terry Moore as Martha Atkinson
- Vince Howard as James Barning
- Virginia Gregg as Nurse Nelson
