= Strand tube station =

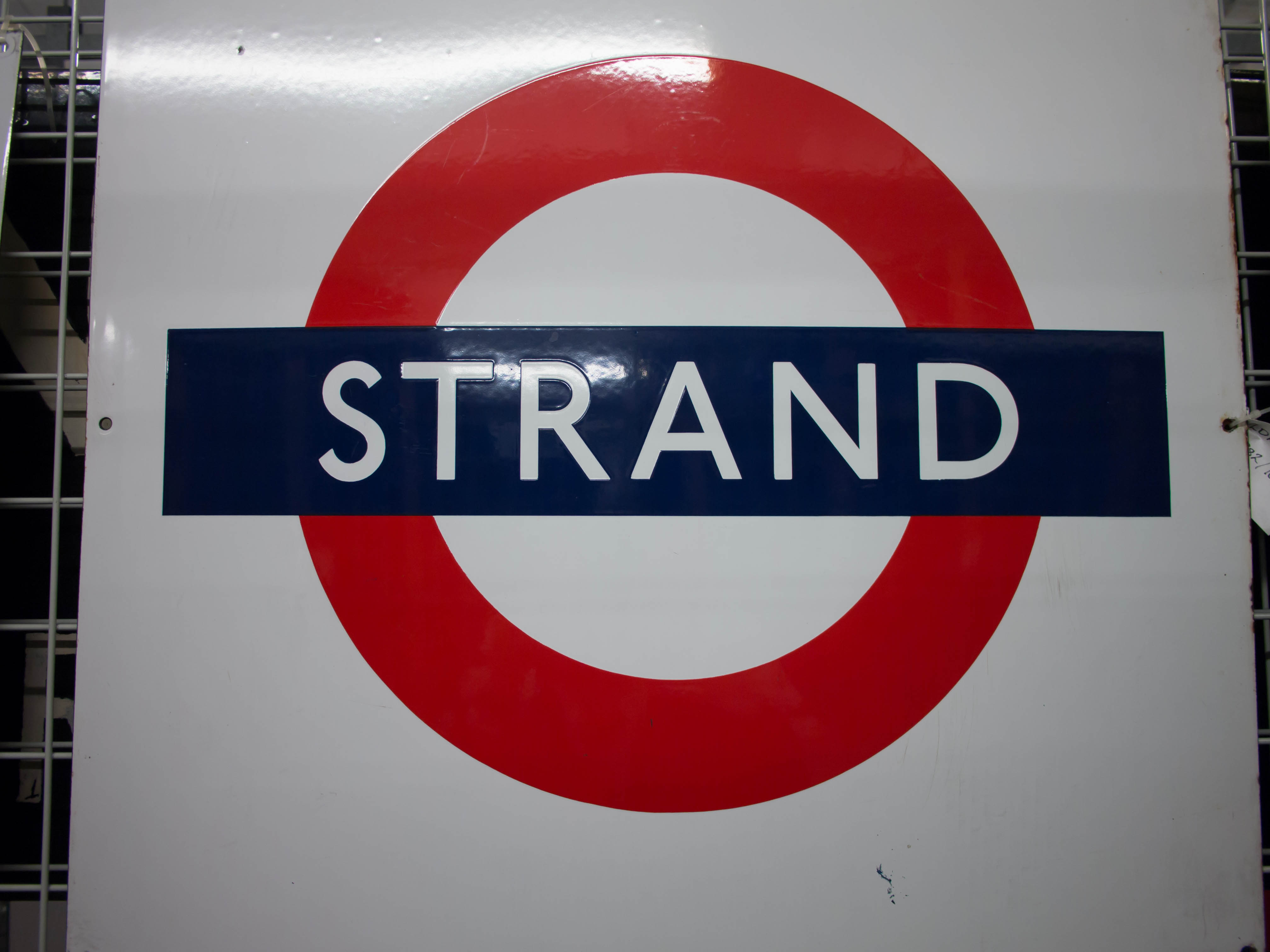

Strand tube station may refer to two different London Underground stations:

- Aldwych tube station, a disused Piccadilly line station, originally known as Strand until 1915
- Charing Cross tube station; the Northern line part of this station, known as Strand from 1915 to 1973

== See also ==
- Strand station (disambiguation)
