= Andreas Strand =

Andreas Strand may refer to:

- Andreas Strand (gymnast)
- Andreas Strand (entomologist)
- Andreas Strand (footballer)
