= Ștrand =

Ștrand is a residential district of Sibiu, Romania, located in the western part of the city.

The district is located around the swimming pool complex of the city, the name deriving from that fact. It is separated into two smaller neighborhoods: Ștrand I and Ștrand II.

== History ==
In 1920 the first outdoor swimming pool complex of Sibiu was built and in the year 1970, during the communist regime industrialization program, new streets and apartment buildings in the typical communist style were built.
