= Strandloper =

Strandloper may refer to:

- Strandloper (novel), novel by English writer Alan Garner
- Strandloper (people), ethnic group of south-western Africa
- Harry die strandloper (fl. c.1625-1665), Khoikhoi tribal leader
- Sandpiper (Dutch: Strandlopers en snippen), a large family of shorebirds or waders
- Straandlooper, a Northern Irish animation studio
