= The Young Runaways (1978 film) =

- Genre: Adventure; Drama; Family
- Written by: Sy Gomberg
- Directed by: Russ Mayberry
- Starring: Gary Collins; Anne Francis; Sharon Farrell; Robert Webber
- Music by: Robert F. Brunner
- Country of origin: United States
- Original language: English

Production
- Executive producer: Ron Miller
- Producer: Jerome Courtland
- Cinematography: Charles F. Wheeler
- Editor: Bob Bring
- Running time: 120 minutes
- Production company: Walt Disney Productions

Original release
- Network: NBC
- Release: May 28, 1978

The Young Runaways is a 1978 American made-for-television drama family film produced by Walt Disney Productions starring Gary Collins, Anne Francis, Sharon Farrell and Robert Webber. It originally aired on NBC as part of The Wonderful World of Disney on May 28, 1978.

== Synopsis ==
"The Young Runaways" are a 12-year-old girl (Alicia Fleer) and her 5-year-old brother (Tommy Crebbs), while on a mission to "kidnap" their brother and sister from a foster home, accidentally become entangled with bank robbers (Anne Francis and Robert Webber) and a precocious, wealthy youngster eager to mastermind the caper.

== Cast ==
- Gary Collins as Lt. Ray Phillips
- Anne Francis as Mrs. Lockhart
- Sharon Farrell as Mamma Doyle
- Robert Webber as Fred Lockhart
- Alicia Fleer as Rosebud Doyle
- Chip Courtland as Eric
- Tommy Crebbs as Joseph T. Doyle
- Pat Delany as Katherine
- Sonny Shroyer as C.L. Doyle
- Dick Bakalyan as Jocko
- Howard T. Platt as Bubba
- Walter Barnes as Sgt. Abel
- Lucille Benson as Grandma Hopkinson
- Jennifer Jason Leigh as Heather
- Tim Pellegrino as Sam

== Home video ==
To date, The Young Runaways has never been released on any physical format by Walt Disney Studios Home Entertainment.
