= Strand (film) =

- Directed by: Rouzbeh Rashidi
- Written by: Rouzbeh Rashidi
- Produced by: Rouzbeh Rashidi
- Starring: Mahdi Safarali
- Release date: May 2009 (Cannes Film Festival)
- Running time: 35 minutes
- Country: Iran
- Language: English

Strand is a 2009 Iranian experimental film directed by Rouzbeh Rashidi that tells the visual bond between nostalgia and physical reality, the liquid phase produced by the condensation of Stream of consciousness will evolve through the film and manifests itself using images and sounds. Strand is a personal journey in memory and time using human models, landscapes and cityscapes of Iran in order to explore the emotion hidden in past and future.

== Production ==
Rashidi made this film with no/low budget over a three months period in summer 2008. Shot in stark black and white, the film deals with images of love, friendship, separation, loneliness and isolation; a "strand" of life in modern-day Iran. The usage of Direct Cinema and cinéma vérité techniques, non-diegetic sound, Super 8mm, stock footage and heavily manipulative editing are the common stylistic styles that shapes Strand.

== Reception ==
Strand premiered in Short Film Corner of Cannes Film Festival (May 2009 Cannes - France). Shortlisted for Culture Unplugged filMedia platform, Culture Unplugged (Online Festival) efforts are focused on enabling networks of socially & spiritually conscious content and its creators. With presence in India, US, UK, Indonesia and New Zealand. The film "Strand – 2008" remained at this venue for 6 months (180 days).
