= Strand Fiord Pass =

Mountain pass in Nunavut, Canada

- Location within Nunavut

Third Approach
- Location: Nunavut, Canada
- Coordinates: 79°16′07″N 88°45′00″W
- Topo map: NTS 59H8 Strand Fiord Pass

Strand Fiord Pass is a mountain pass on southern Axel Heiberg Island, Nunavut, Canada.
