= Stranded (1965 film) =

1965 film directed by Juleen Compton

- Directed by: Juleen Compton
- Written by: Juleen Compton
- Produced by: Juleen Compton
- Starring: Juleen Compton; Gary Collins; Alkis Giannakas
- Cinematography: Demos Sakeyyariose
- Edited by: Claude Plouganou; A. Siaskas
- Music by: Giannis Sakellaridis
- Production company: Compton Films
- Distributed by: Compton Film Distributors
- Release date: May 1965
- Running time: 90 minutes
- Country: United States
- Language: English

Stranded is a 1965 film directed by Juleen Compton. The film, shot largely in Greece, stars Compton as one of three people on a barge voyage in the region of Athens.

== Cast ==
- Juleen Compton as Raina
- Gary Collins as Bob
- Alkis Giannakas as Nicos
- Gian Pietro Calasso as The Painter
