= Strand Church =

Strand Church may refer to:

- Strand Church (Nord-Aurdal), a church in Nord-Aurdal municipality in Innlandet county, Norway
- Strand Church (Rogaland), a church in Strand municipality in Rogaland county, Norway
- Strand Church (Stor-Elvdal), a church in Stor-Elvdal municipality in Innlandet county, Norway

== See also ==
- St Mary le Strand, a church in London, England
- Stranda Church, a church in Sunnmøre, Norway
- Stranda Church (Leksvik), a church in Trøndelag, Norway
