= Strand Theatre =

Strand Theatre or Strand Theater may refer to:

== Australia ==
- Strand Theatre, Toowoomba, Queensland, Australia

== England ==
- Royal Strand Theatre, London, demolished 1905
- Strand Theatre, London, called the Novello Theatre since 2005

== United States ==
- Strand Theatre, former movie house in Ocean Beach, San Diego, California, built in 1925
- Strand Theatre (San Francisco), reopening in 2015 now owned by American Conservatory Theater, originally opened in 1917 and shuttered in 2003, in San Francisco, California
- Strand Theatre (Jennings, Louisiana), listed on the National Register of Historic Places in Jefferson Davis Parish, Louisiana
- Strand Theatre (Shreveport, Louisiana), listed on the National Register of Historic Places in Caddo Parish, Louisiana
- Strand Theatre (Rockland, Maine), listed on the National Register of Historic Places in Knox County, Maine
- Strand Theatre, Brockton, Massachusetts, site of a fire that killed 13 firefighters in 1941
- Strand Theatre (Boston), a restored vaudeville house located in Uphams Corner in Boston, Massachusetts
- Strand Theater (Lexington, Mississippi), a Mississippi Landmark
- Strand Theater (Louisville, Mississippi), a Mississippi Landmark
- Strand Theater (Vicksburg, Mississippi); listed on the National Register of Historic Places under the name "Adolph Rose Building"
- Strand Theater (Manchester, New Hampshire), theater portion destroyed by fire in 1985
- Strand Theatre (Lakewood, New Jersey), listed on the National Register of Historic Places in Ocean County, New Jersey
- Strand Theatre (Brooklyn), a former vaudeville house now home to BRIC Arts and UrbanGlass
- Strand Theatre (Ithaca, New York), listed on the National Register of Historic Places in Tompkins County, New York
- Strand Theatre (Manhattan), demolished Broadway movie theatre opened in 1914
- Strand Theater (Plattsburgh, New York), listed on the National Register of Historic Places in Clinton County, New York
- Strand Theater (Syracuse, New York), theatre in Syracuse, New York from 1915 to 1958
- Strand Theatre (Grafton, North Dakota), listed on the National Register of Historic Places in Walsh County, North Dakota
- Strand Theatre (Delaware, Ohio), movie theatre opened in 1916
- Strand Theater (Zelienople, Pennsylvania), a community theatre
- Strand Theater (Washington, D.C.), theater located on Nannie Helen Burroughs Avenue in Washington, D.C.
- Strand Theatre (Washington, D.C.), theater located at the corner of 9th and D Streets in Washington, D.C.
- Strand Theatre (Moundsville, West Virginia), home of the Wheeling Jamboree radio program
- Strand Theater (Allentown, Pennsylvania), a former cinema in Allentown, Pennsylvania
- Strand Theatre (Marietta, Georgia), a performing arts and film center in Marietta, Georgia, United States of America
