= Huvudsta =

Coordinates: 59°20′58″N 17°59′08″E

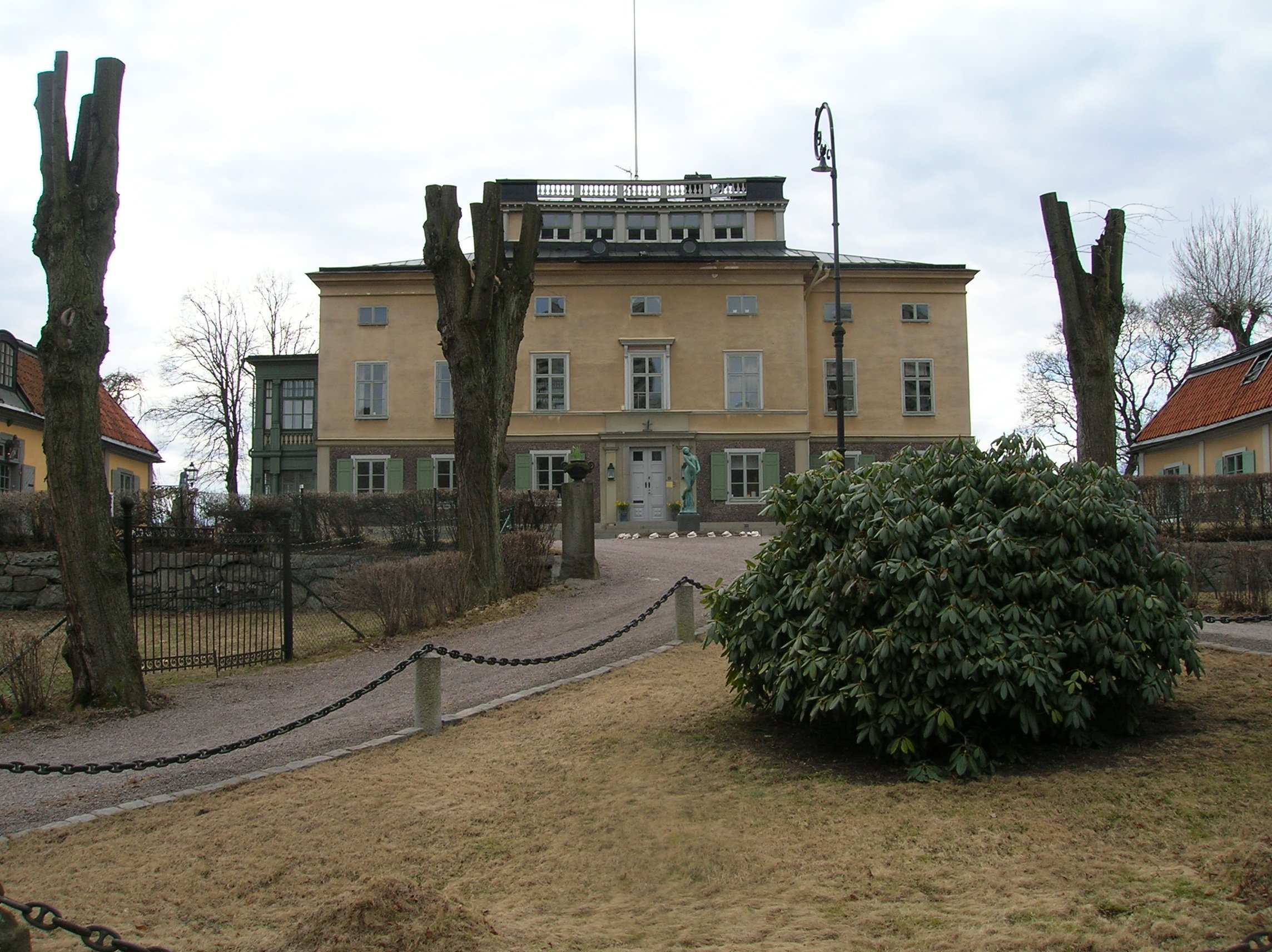
Huvudsta gård (estate) mansion

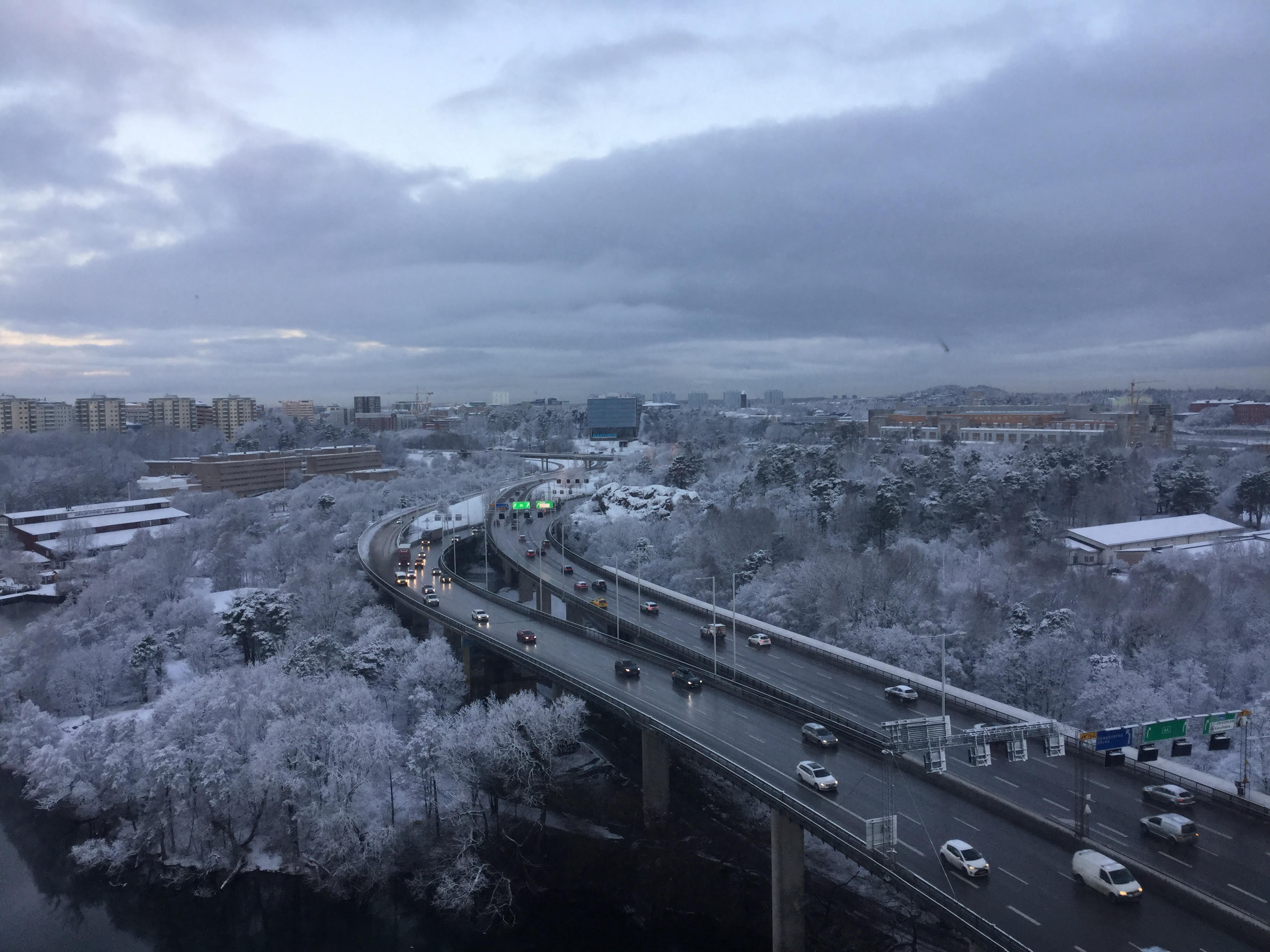
Looking north from Kungsholmen over to Huvudsta

Huvudsta is a suburb of Stockholm Located in Solna Municipality, Sweden, it has a rich history, including its development as a residential area with areas such as Jungfrudansen as well as its connection with Karlberg Palace which was built in the 17th century. Huvudsta metro, as part of the Blue line, opened in 1985, is an important landmark in the area, connecting it to the rest of Stockholm The suburb is connected to Ulvsunda by the Huvudstabron.
