= Barkarbystaden metro station =

Future Stockholm Metro station

Barkarbystaden
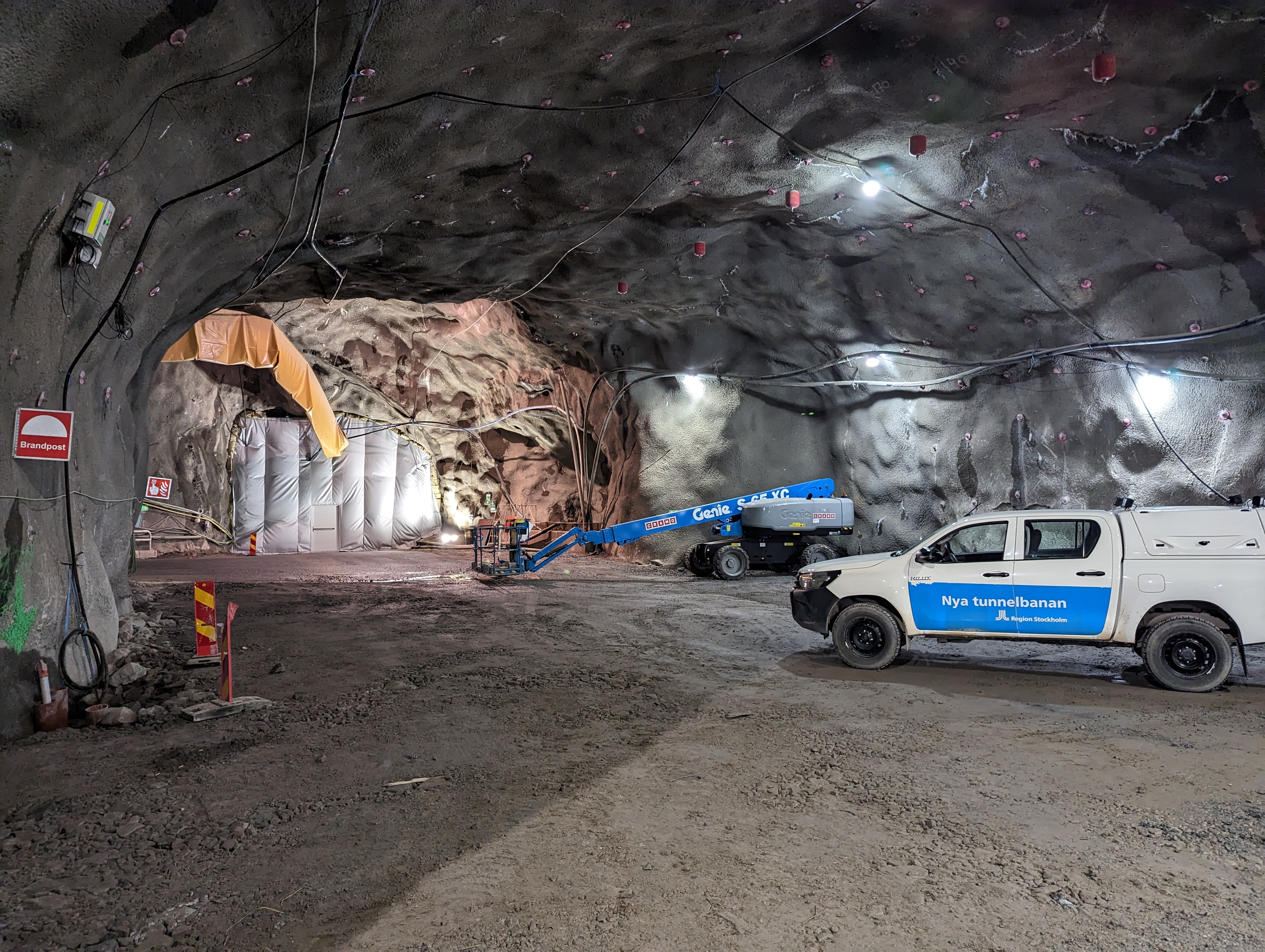
- Tunnel construction in Barkarby in 2023

General information
- System: Stockholm mMtro station
- Owner: Storstockholms Lokaltrafik
- Platforms: 1 island platform
- Tracks: 2

Construction
- Structure type: Underground
- Depth: ca. 30m
- Accessible: Yes

History
- Opening: 2027; 1 year's time

Services
Preceding station: Barkarby station
Proceeding station: Akalla metro station
Location

Barkarbystaden is a future station on the Blue Line of the Stockholm Metro, located in the Järfälla Municipality, Stockholm County. It is part of the extension from Akalla to Barkarby station, which includes two new stations. The station will be situated in the emerging city center of Barkarbystaden, a district being developed on the site of a former airport.

== Design ==
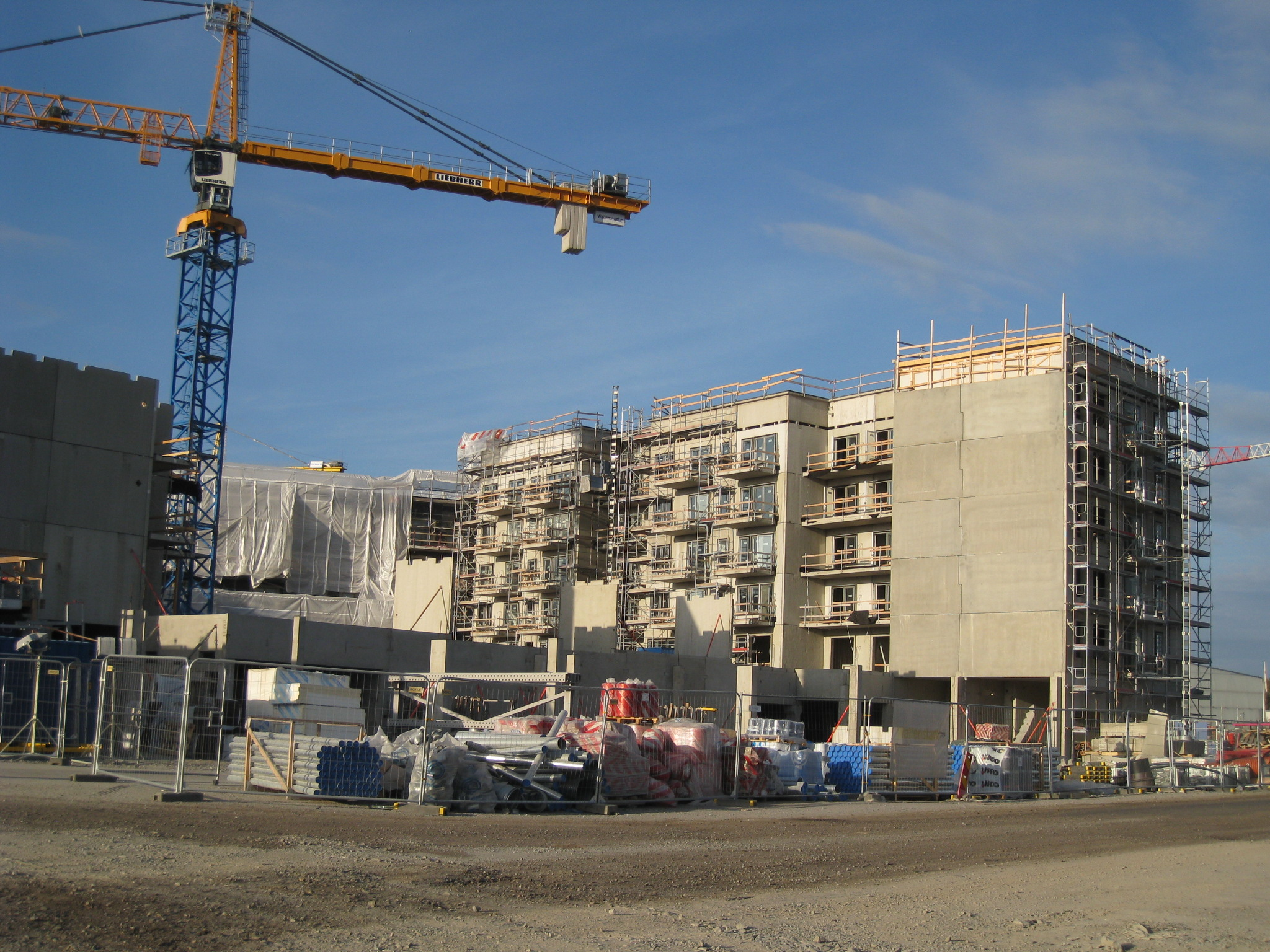
Barkarbystaden area under development

The station will feature a single underground island platform, and will have two entrances: An eastern entrance, integrated into a new building on the ground floor; and a western entrance, designed as a pavilion located in a central square called Sveatorget.

Both entrances will lead to ticket halls at ground level, from which escalators and lifts will provide access to the underground platforms. The design aims to create a bright atmosphere, incorporating artistic elements by Helena Byström.

== Construction ==
Construction for Barkarbystaden station began in 2018, with an expected opening in 2027. The station will be situated approximately 30 meters underground and is designed to accommodate future growth in the surrounding Barkarbystaden area, which is projected to include 14,000 new homes and various commercial spaces.
