= Barkarby =

Barkarby Barkarbystaden
- District
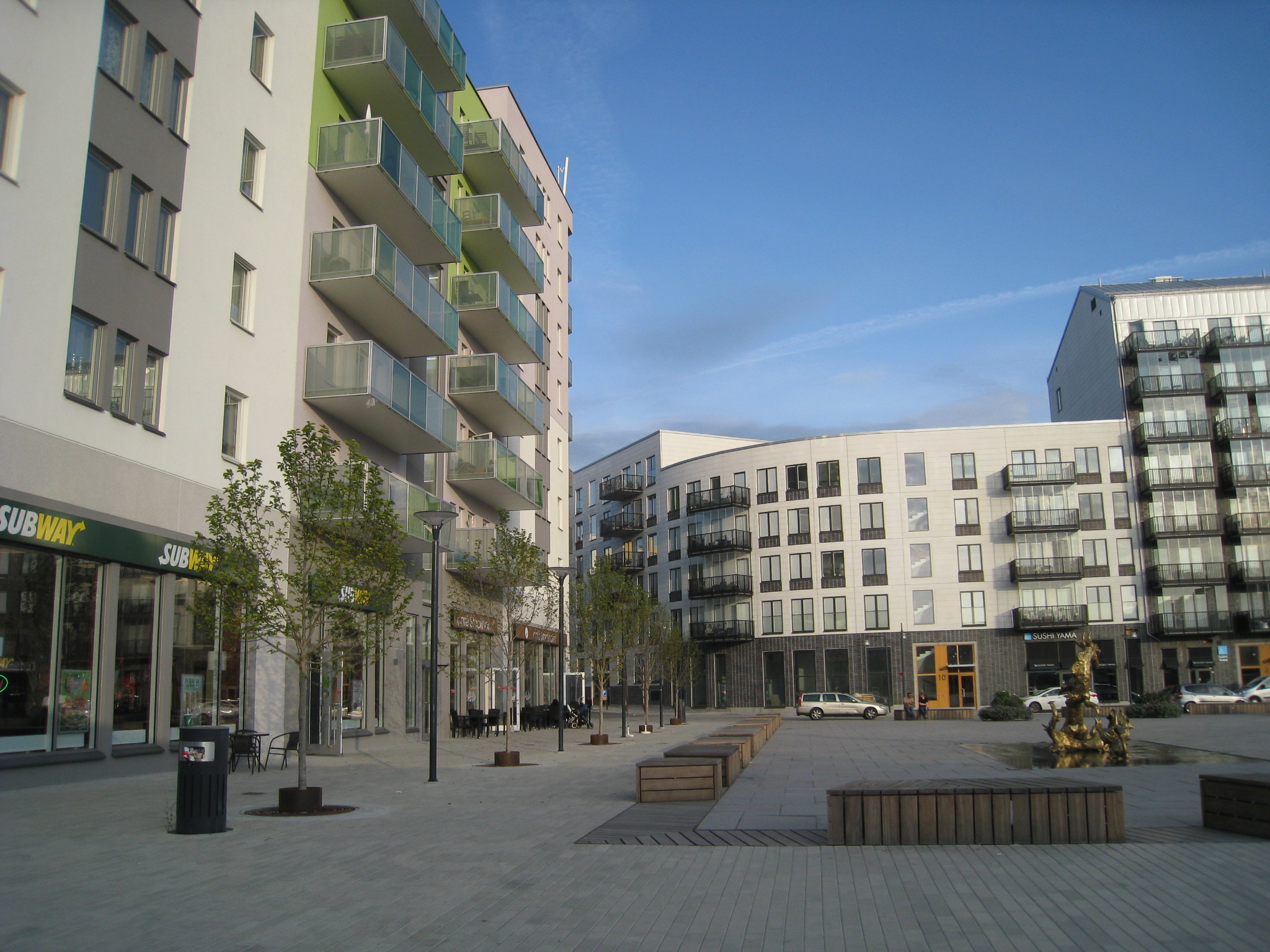
- Stora Torget at Barkarbystaden

- Location in Stockholm County Barkarby (Sweden)
- Coordinates: 59°24′01″N 17°51′45″E
- Country: Sweden
- County: Stockholm County
- Municipality: Järfälla Municipality

Area
  - Total: 15 km^{2} (5.8 sq mi)
- Time zone: UTC+1 (CET)
  - Summer (DST): UTC+2 (CEST)
- Area code: +46
- Website: Järfälla Municipality

Barkarby, also known as Barkarbystaden is an area in Järfälla Municipality, Stockholm County, Sweden, and part of the contiguously built-up Stockholm urban area. It is currently undergoing a large urban development through the Barkarbystaden project, transforming a former military airbase and airport area into an urban district.

Barkarby has a station on the Stockholm commuter rail network, and two metro stations, Barkarby and Barkarbystaden are set to open in 2027 as an extension of the Stockholm Metro Blue Line.

== History ==
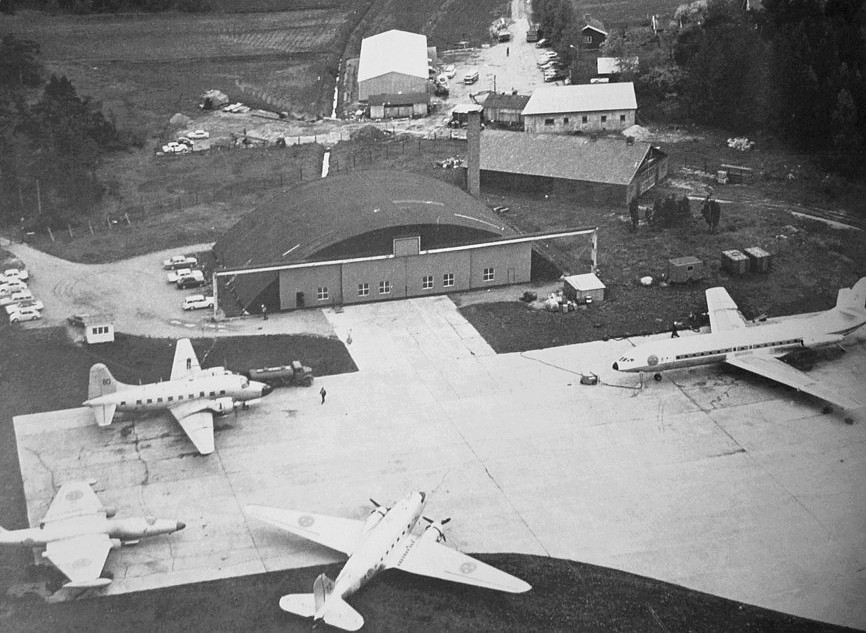
Barkarby airfield in the 1960s

During the 1912 Summer Olympics, Barkarby hosted the endurance trials for the equestrian eventing competition. Additionally, the equestrian portion of the modern pentathlon competition took place in Barkarby.

== Barkarbystaden ==
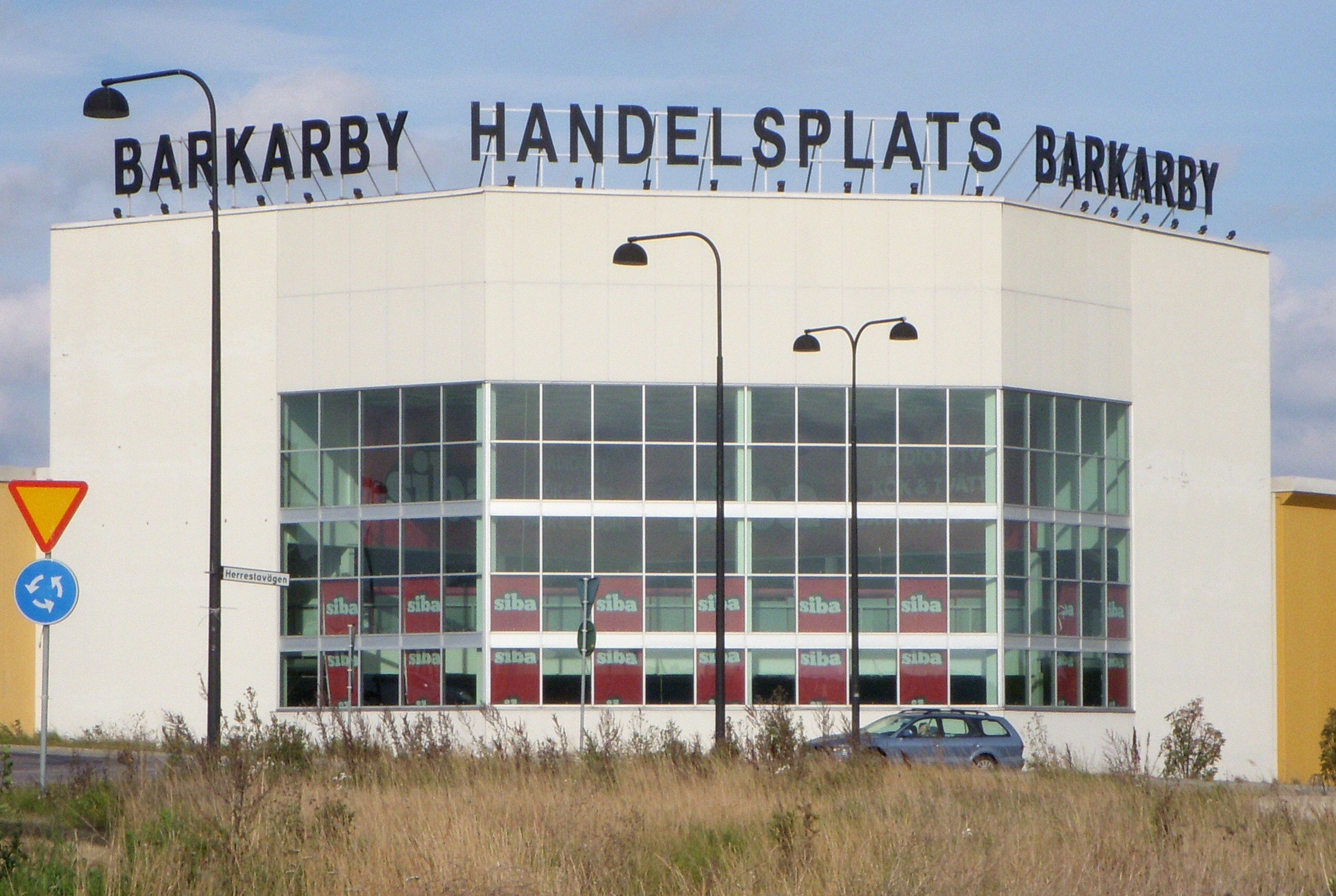
Barkarby Retail Park in 2010

Barkarbystaden is a large-scale urban development project located within the Barkarby-Skälby district in Järfälla Municipality and the built-up area of Stockholm. The area is primarily situated on the former site of the Svea Air Wing and later the Svea Air Corps, adjacent to the now-closed Barkarby Airfield.

Barkarbystaden is one of the largest expansion areas in the Stockholm region, with plans to develop 14,000 new homes for 30,000 new residents and thousands of new workplaces in offices and commercial spaces by 2035. The ambition is to transform Järfälla from a suburb into a city, positioning it as a new hub for western Stockholm and the Mälardalen region.

=== Development plans ===
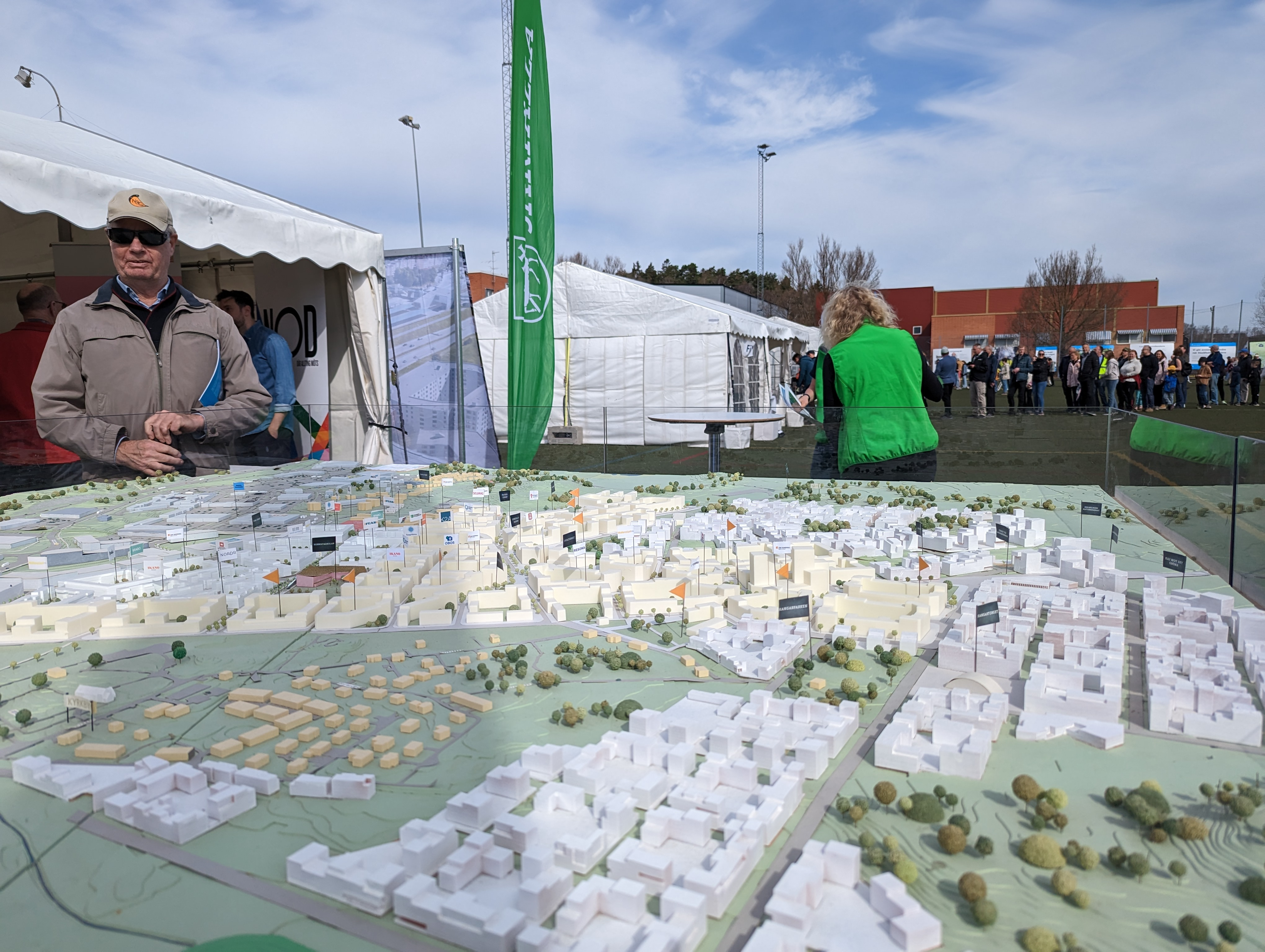
Model of Future Developments

The project includes the construction of 18,000 new homes, comprising both rental and condominium apartments, as well as townhouses and villas. In addition to the existing Barkarby Retail Park, the development plans include up to 10,000 new workplaces by 2030.

The first residents moved into the area on May 23, 2014, with twenty apartments ready for occupancy.

In January 2016, Herrestaskolan, a new primary and secondary school, was completed. It is Sweden's first major school built entirely from cross-laminated timber and features a dance hall, a large library, and a spacious sports hall with stands. The school is equipped with 1,400 square meters of solar panels to cover a significant portion of its energy needs.

=== Infrastructure and green spaces ===
The development area spans approximately 15 hectares and includes streets, squares, and "Å-rummet" featuring the Bällsta River. This area is designed as a prominent parkland with greenery, water features, logs, stones, bridges, and attractions, scheduled to be inaugurated at the end of June 2024. The river not only provides recreational opportunities but also aids in managing flow changes and stormwater.

Järfälla Municipality is expanding roads, water, sewage, and waste systems to support the new housing.

Bas Barkarby, a multifunctional block serving as a meeting place for businesses, education, sports, health, and culture, was completed in early 2022. It includes a full-sized sports hall and a stage for theater and seminars.

Seven additional blocks are planned, including Parkkvarteret with 220 apartments already occupied since fall 2023, Brokvarteret with over 400 apartments scheduled for 2025, and other properties designated for hotels, offices, and housing. The area is being developed with ground-level commercial spaces to create a vibrant urban district, featuring squares, offices, hotels, and parking garages.

Skanska, involved in developing the district's infrastructure, has built a bridge over the E18 motorway connecting Barkarbystaden with Veddesta. This bridge is a crucial link to the emerging transportation hub at Barkarby station, which will integrate commuter trains, the metro, buses, regional trains, long-distance trains, and the upcoming metro extension on the Blue Line from Akalla.

== Transport ==
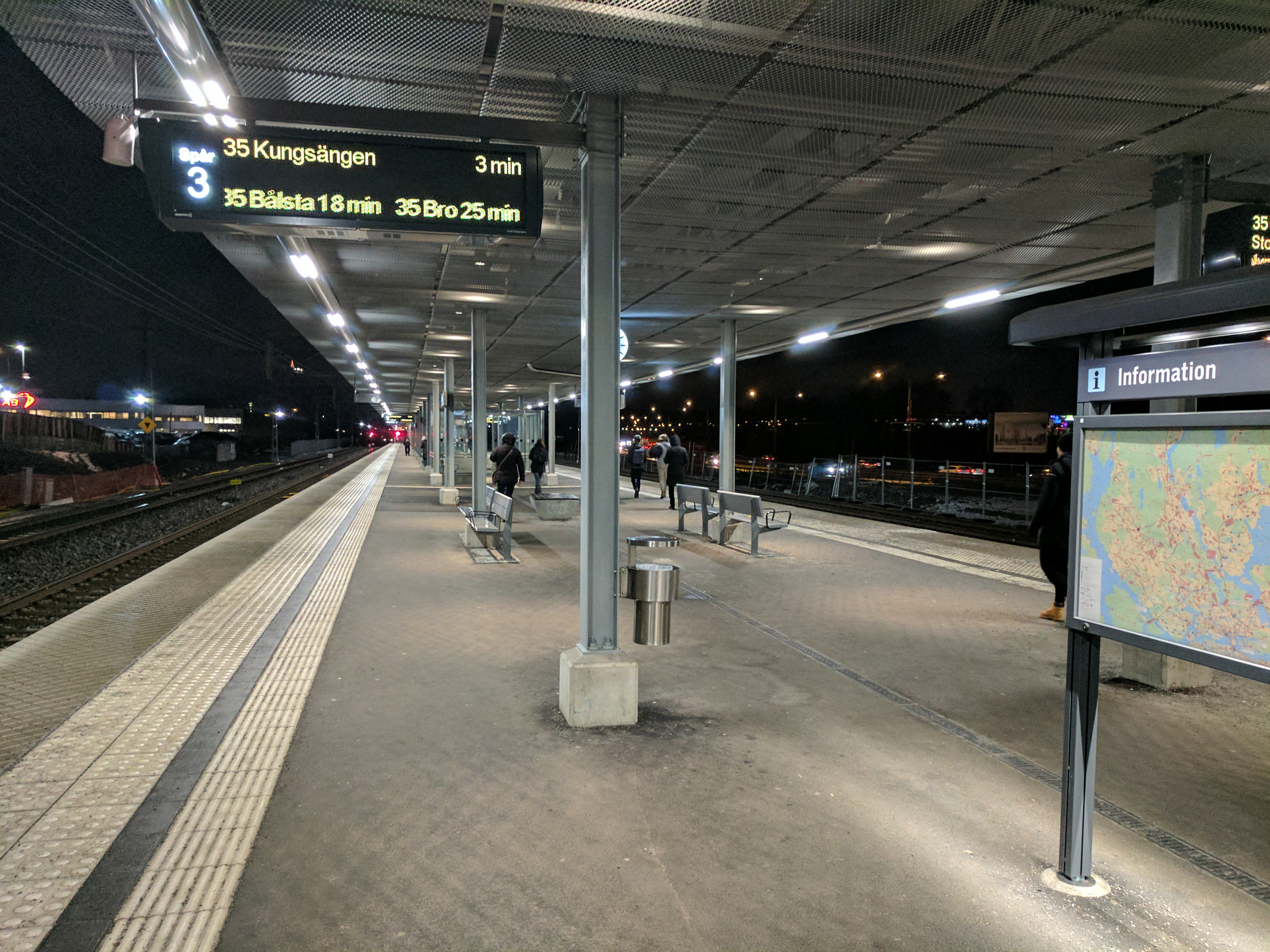
Barkarby Station

Barkarby is well-connected via the Stockholm commuter rail network. Additionally, as part of the Stockholm Agreement of 2013, the Stockholm Metro's Blue Line will be extended to Barkarbystaden, with operations expected to begin around 2027. This extension includes two new stations: Barkarbystaden and Barkarby, extending approximately 4 kilometers from the current terminus at Akalla station.

=== Metro extension ===
The construction of the Stockholm Metro extension to Barkarby began in August 2018, with an estimated completion time of six years. The extension will feature two new stations, Barkarbystaden and Barkarby, located approximately 30 meters below ground level. The travel time between Barkarby station and Kista is expected to be 9 minutes, and 17 minutes to Solna Centrum. All tracks are being constructed from the bedrock, excavating 710,000 m^{3} of hard rock and using 32,000 m^{3} of concrete.

Upon completion, the Barkarby station will facilitate easy transfers between the metro, commuter trains, buses, and regional trains from Mälardalen. The new stations are expected to handle approximately 2,800 passengers per hour during peak times by 2030.

=== Driverless buses ===
Barkarbystaden was one of the first areas in Sweden to introduce driverless buses. The trial program concluded on September 30, 2023.

== Awards ==
Each year, Järfälla Municipality awards a "building award" to recognize and honor good architectural practices in new constructions and the preservation of culturally, environmentally, or artistically valuable buildings. The award is decided and presented by the environmental and building permit committee.

In 2015, the award was given to the apartment building at Ålsta Square in Barkarbystaden. The building was developed by Viktor Hanson and designed by Joliark, through architects Per Johanson and Annika Högsander.

In 2014, the local "building award" was shared between the Kyrkparken development in Barkarbystaden and the Kallhälls gård redevelopment, with an honorable mention for the "Flottiljens äldreboende" in Barkarbystaden.

== See also ==
- Barkarby Airport
