= Sundbybergs centrum metro station =

Stockholm Metro Station

Sundbybergs centrum
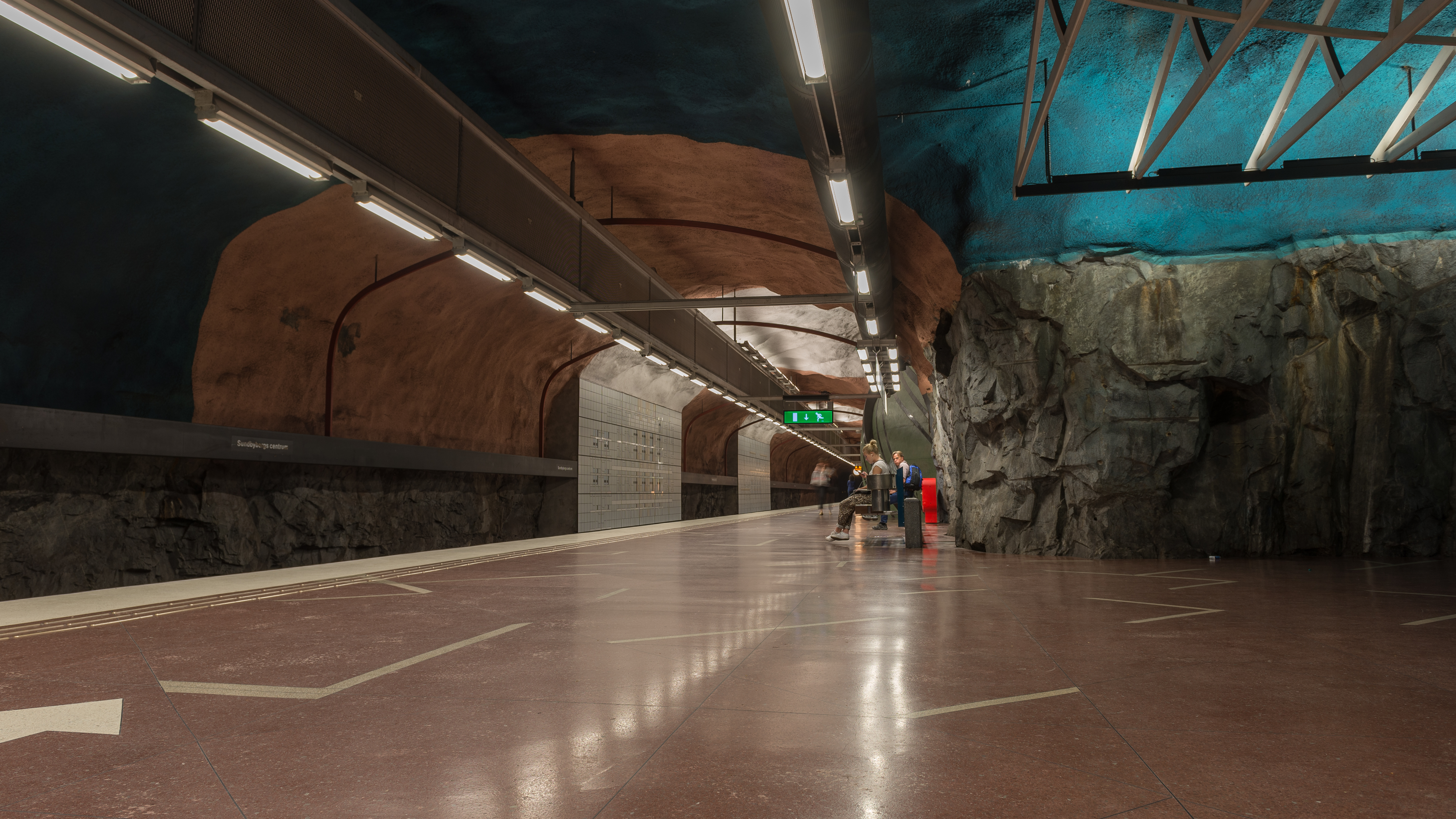

General information
- Location: Sundbyberg
- Coordinates: 59°21′39″N 17°58′14″E
- Elevation: 11.5 m (38 ft) below sea level
- System: Stockholm Metro station
- Owner: Storstockholms Lokaltrafik
- Platforms: 1 island platform
- Tracks: 2

Construction
- Structure type: Underground
- Depth: 26 m (85 ft)
- Accessible: Yes

Other information
- Station code: SBG

History
- Opened: 19 August 1985; 41 years ago

Passengers
- 2019: 12,300 boarding per weekday (metro)
- 2019: 14,300 boarding per weekday (commuter rail)
- 2019: 5,300 boarding per weekday (Tvärbanan)

Services
Preceding station	Stockholm Metro	Following station
Solna strand towards Kungsträdgården	Line 10	Duvbo towards Hjulsta
Location
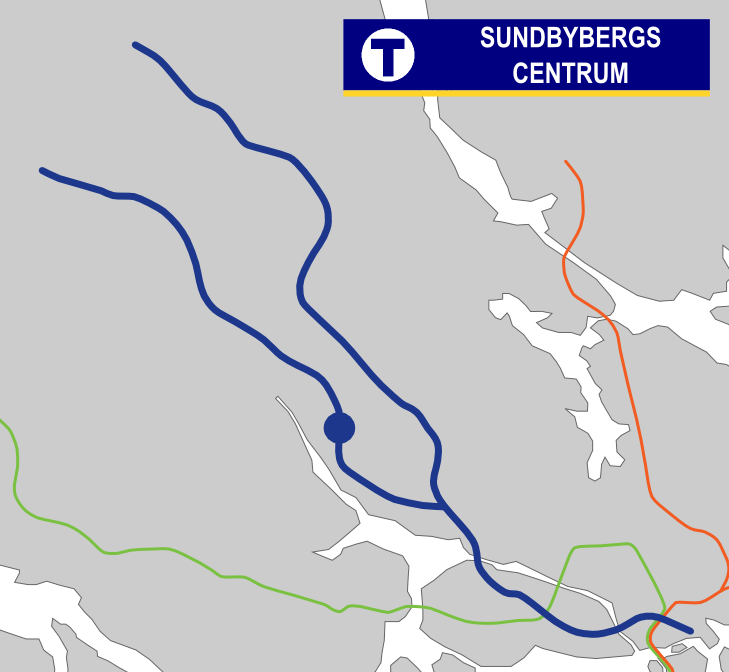

Sundbybergs centrum (Sundbyberg Centre) is a Metro station, located in Sundbyberg Municipality, approximately 8 km (5.0 mi) from the centre of Stockholm. It opened on 19 August 1985 as part of the extension to between Västra skogen and Rinkeby. The metro station is connected to a stop on Tvärbanan with the same name, as well as to Sundbyberg railway station served by the Stockholm commuter rail and long-distance trains.

== Gallery ==
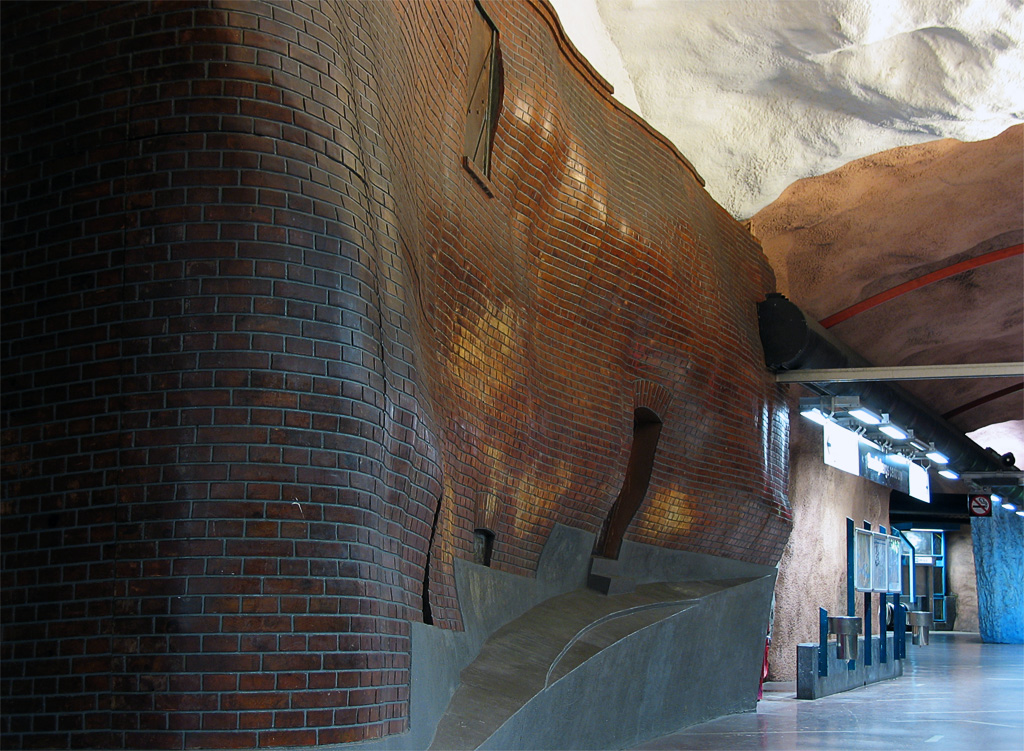
Artwork

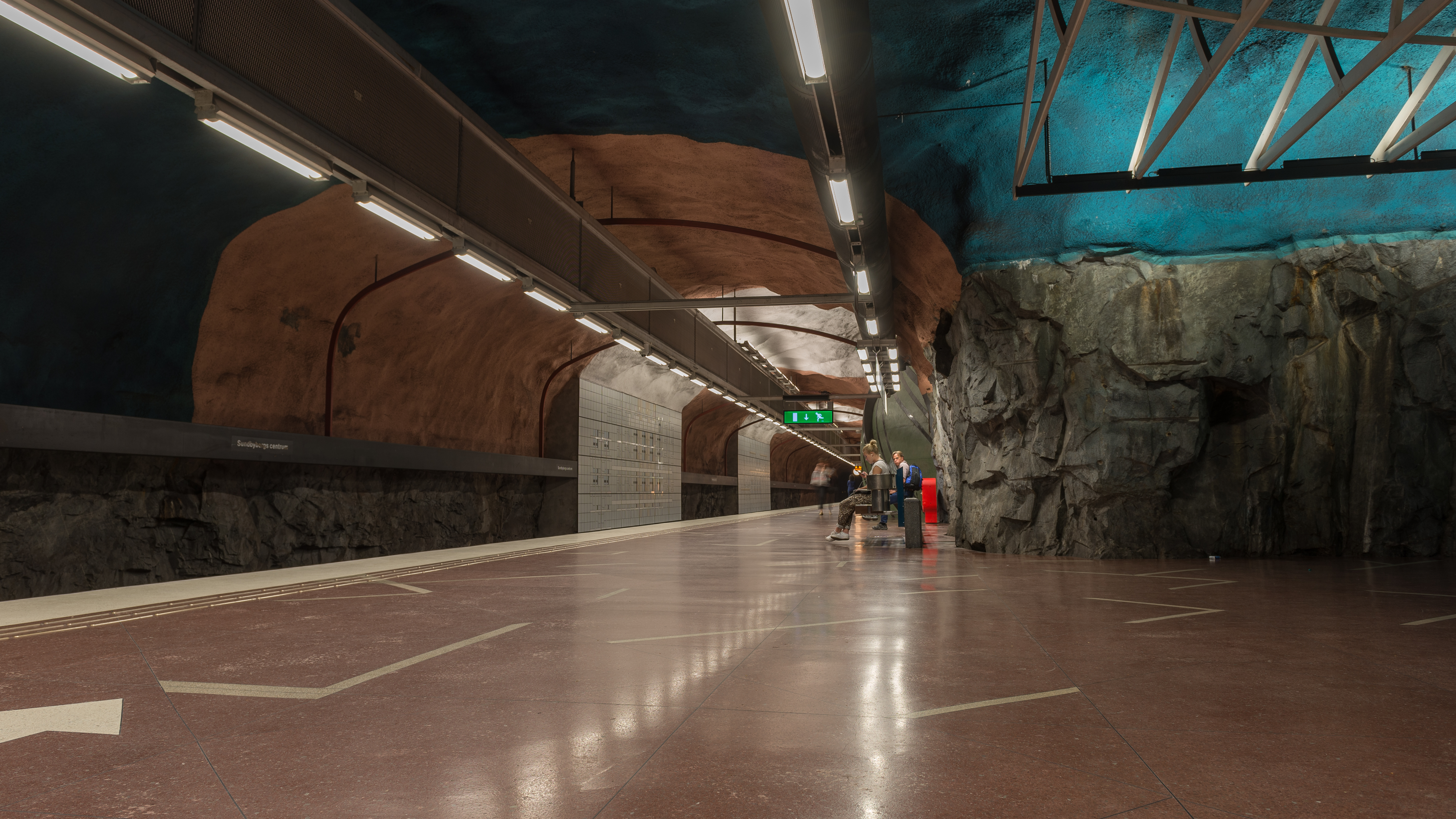
Platform

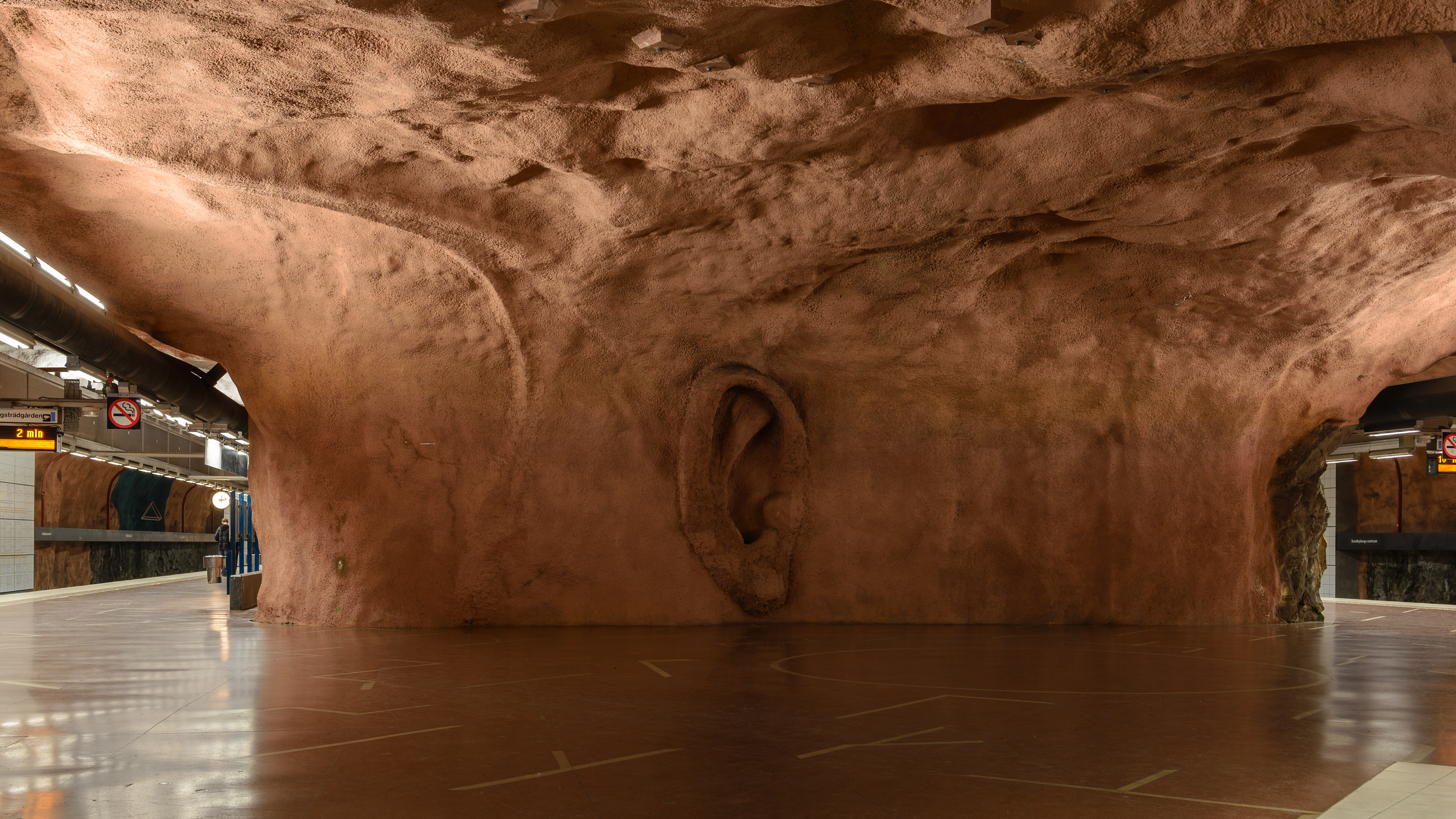
Artwork

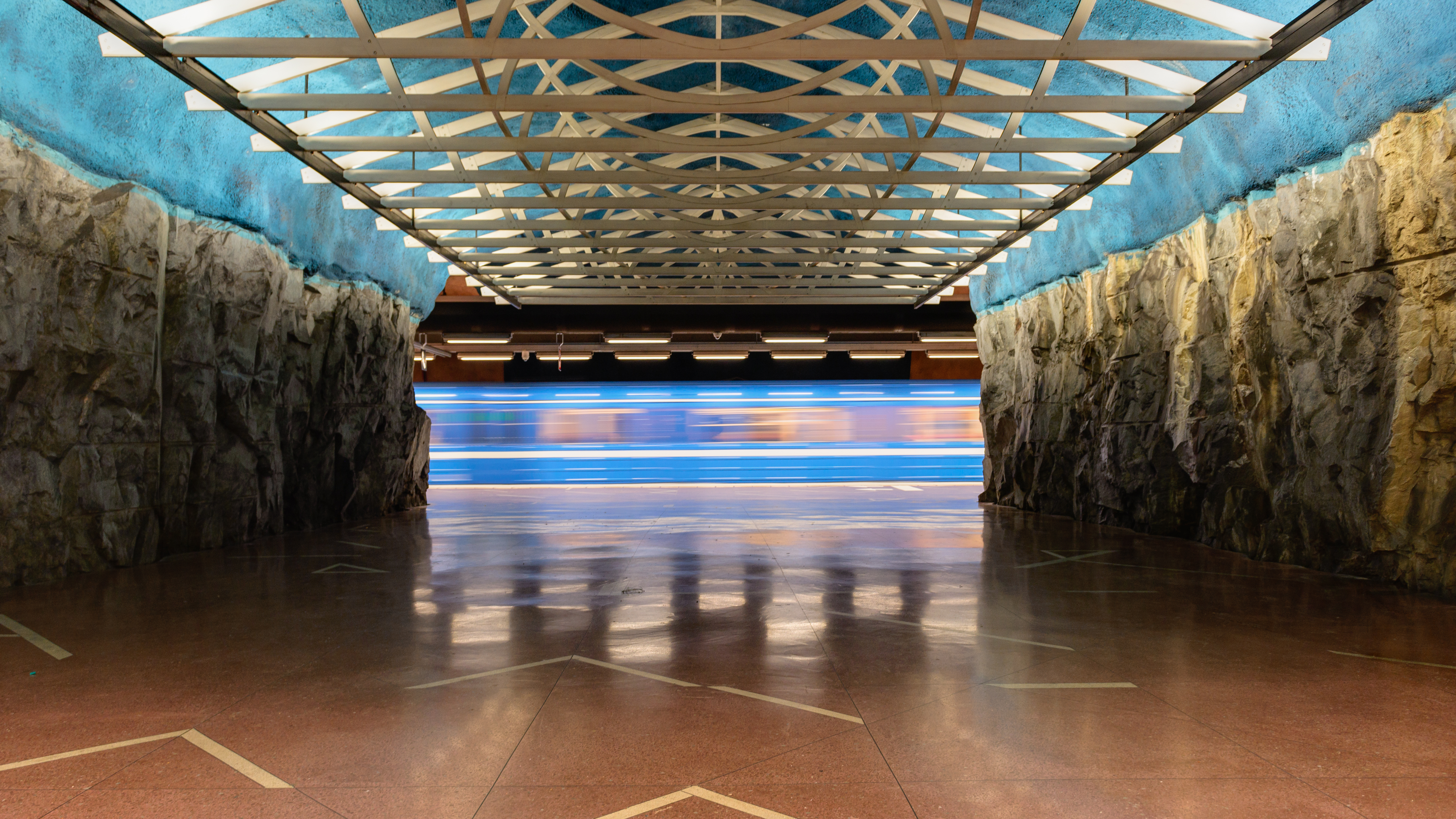
Artwork (sides) with train passing (middle)
