= Sundbyberg railway station =

Railway station in Sundbyberg, Sweden

Sundbyberg
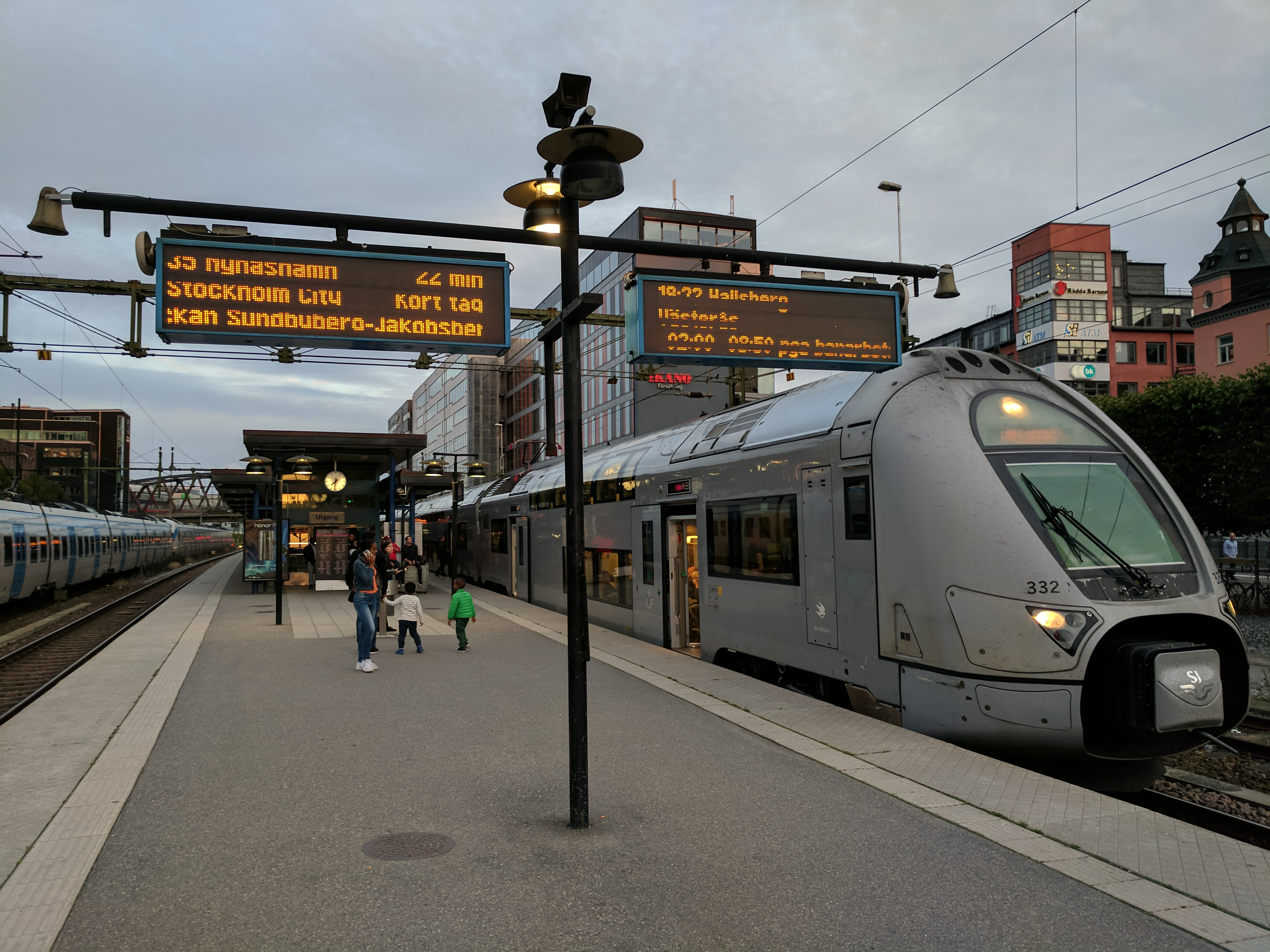

General information
- Coordinates: 59.3609°N 17.9714°E
- System: Pendeltåg, SJ Regional
- Owner: Trafikverket
- Platforms: 1 island platform
- Tracks: 2
- Connections: Blue Line (Stockholm Metro)

Construction
- Structure type: At-grade
- Accessible: Yes

History
- Opened: 1876

Passengers
- 2022: 12,900 boarding per weekday (Commuter Rail)

Services
Preceding station	Stockholm commuter rail	Following station
Spånga towards Bålsta	43	Stockholm Odenplan towards Nynäshamn
Spånga towards Kallhäll	43X	Stockholm Odenplan towards Nynäshamn
Spånga towards Bro	44	Stockholm Odenplan towards Tumba

Other services
Preceding station	SJ	Following station
Stockholm C Terminus	Mälaren Line and Western Main Line	Bålsta towards Göteborg C via Örebro C

Tvärbanan
Preceding station	SL Local & Light Rail	Following station
Solna Business Park towards Solna station	Tvärbanan Line 30	Bällsta bro towards Sickla
Location

Sundbyberg is a railway station in central Sundbyberg, Sweden, 6.4 kilometers from Stockholm Central Station. It opened in 1876 as part of the Mälaren Line. The station serves both Stockholm commuter rail trains around Stockholm County, and regional trains operated by SJ to Västerås and Gothenburg. It is located directly adjacent to the border with Solna Municipality.

The station features a central platform accessible via a pedestrian tunnel. Approximately 12,900 passengers use the commuter trains at this station daily as of 2022. Adjacent transport includes Sundbybergs centrum metro station on the Blue Line of the Stockholm Metro, Sundbybergs centrum stop on the Tvärbanan light rail system, and local busses. Sundbyberg is one of the few stations in the network where regional and commuter trains operate from the same platform.

== History ==
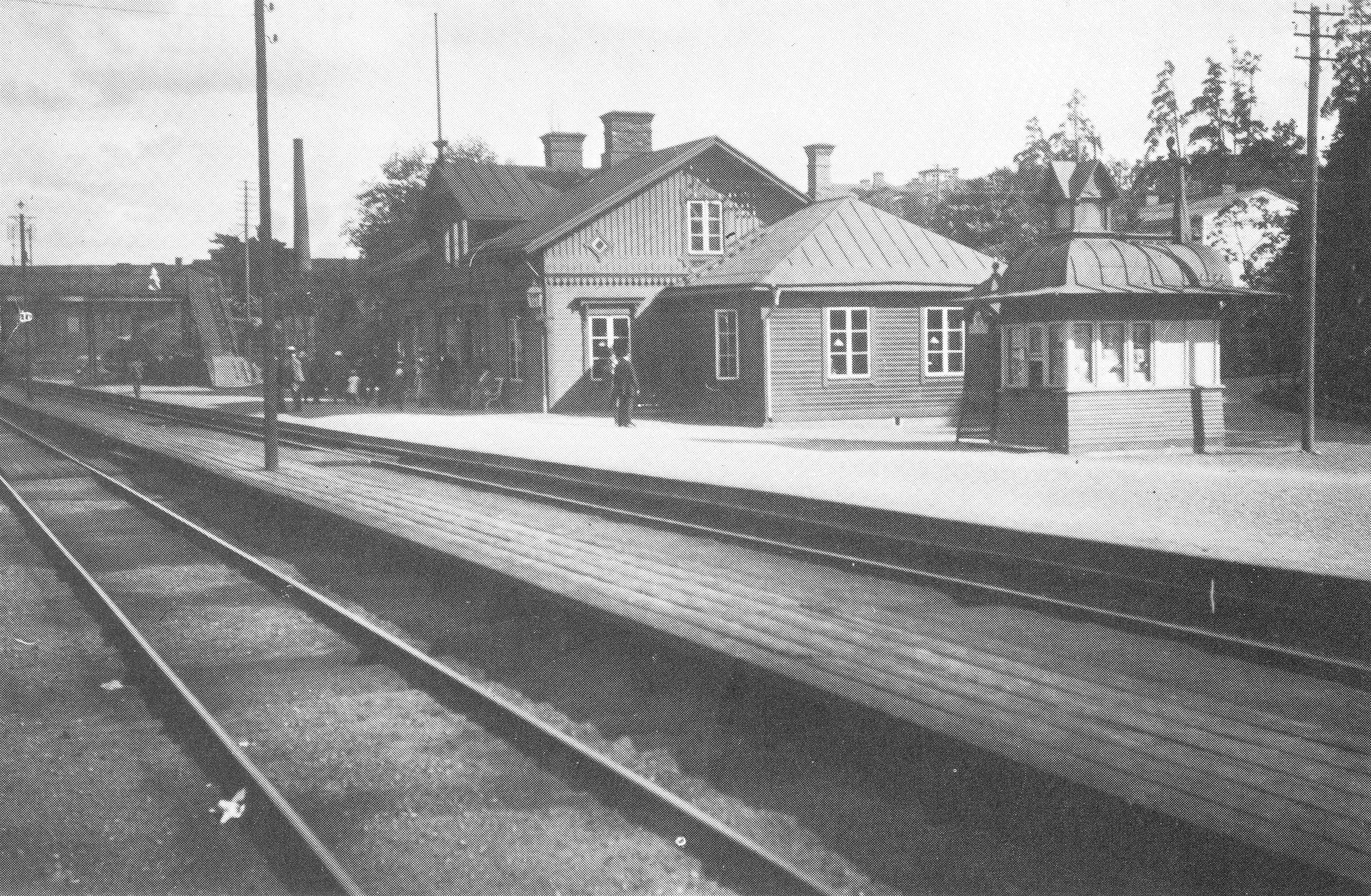
The Station in 1922

Sundbyberg railway station opened in 1876, coinciding with the inauguration of the private Stockholm–Västerås–Bergslagen railway. It was named after the nearby Sundbybergs gård manor, whose owner, Anders Petter Löfström, successfully convinced the railway to establish a station at this site. Following this, he subdivided much of his property for housing, prompting the development of a community around the station. This marked the beginning of Sundbyberg as a railway town.

Over the following decades, the area's accessibility to Stockholm attracted various factories, resulting in an influx of working-class residents. The original station building was replaced in the 1960s by a larger office structure, while the current station building was completed in 1986.

From 1900 to 1963, a smaller station named Sundbyberg North operated approximately 900 meters north of the main station. Stockholm tram number 15 from Norra Bantorget ran to Sundbyberg until the service was discontinued in August 1959.

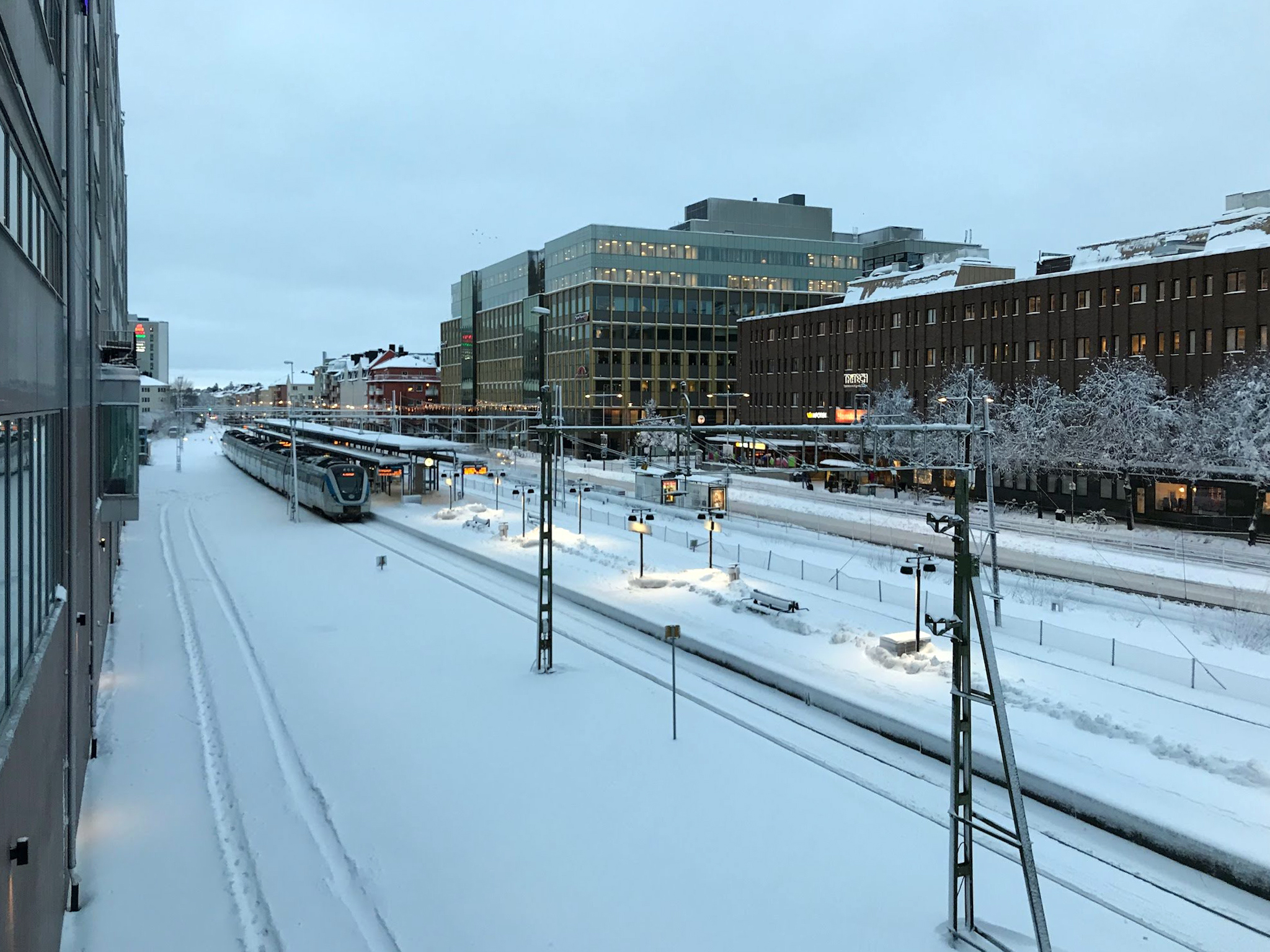
Sundbyberg Station in Winter

The area was reformed into Sundbyberg Municipality during the 1971 municipal reform, by this point the Sundbyberg was well within the urban area of Stockholm. In recent years, Sundbyberg has shifted toward a more service-oriented economy, with firms establishing offices in the area.

The station serves as an interchange for the Stockholm Metro, via an underground passage to Sundbybergs centrum metro station, which opened in 1985, and to the adjacent Tvärbanan light rail stop, which began operations through Sundbyberg in 2013.

== Future plans ==
As part of the Mälarbanan expansion, which will widen the line through Sundbyberg from two to four tracks in a cut-and-cover tunnel, the city is planning to rebuild the station slightly to the east, as an underground facility featuring two island platforms instead of the current single platform.

Originally scheduled to begin in 2024, construction of the railway tunnel is now set to start in 2028. This pause is a result of unresolved agreements and permits between the Swedish Transport Administration and the affected municipalities.

As part of the project, Sundbyberg Municipality proposed annexing a section of Solna Municipality to ensure that the new commuter train station would be entirely within its jurisdiction. The existing station is situated next to the border between the two municipalities, but must relocate it further east due to the reconstruction. Solna Municipality indicated that it had no interest in altering the border.

== See also ==
- Stockholm commuter rail
- Sundbybergs centrum metro station
