= Barkarby station =

Railway station in Järfälla, Sweden

Coordinates: 59.404672°N 17.865905°E

Barkarby
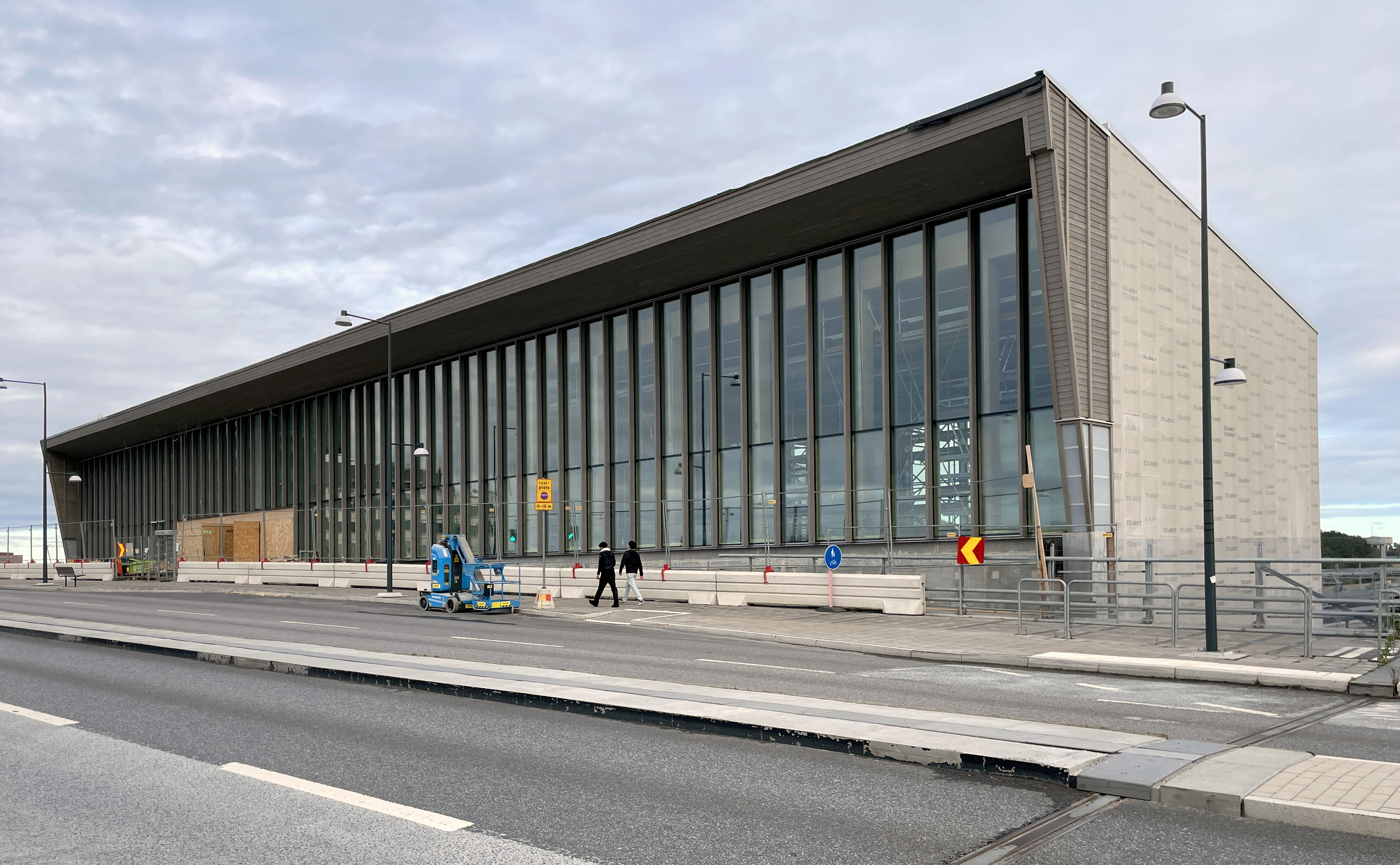
- Northern entrance under construction in 2024

General information
- System: Pendeltåg; Stockholm Metro (Opening 2027)
- Owner: Trafikverket
- Operator: Storstockholms Lokaltrafik
- Platforms: 1 island platform
- Tracks: 4

Construction
- Structure type: At-grade
- Depth: 30 m (98 ft)
- Accessible: Yes

History
- Opened: 1878
- Opening: 2027 (Metro station)
- Rebuilt: 2016

Passengers
- 2022: 4,900 boarding per weekday

Services
Preceding station	Stockholm commuter rail	Following station
Jakobsberg towards Bålsta	43	Spånga towards Nynäshamn
Jakobsberg towards Kallhäll	43X	Spånga towards Nynäshamn
Jakobsberg towards Bro	44	Spånga towards Tumba

Future services
Preceding station	Stockholm Metro	Following station
Terminus	Line 11	Barkarbystaden towards Akalla
Location

Barkarby station is a railway station and future metro station located in the Barkarby area of Järfälla Municipality in Stockholm County. Currently part of the Stockholm commuter rail network on the Mälaren Line, it lies approximately 14.6 kilometers northwest of Stockholm City railway station.

The station is being upgraded to also serve long-distance and regional trains and will include a new metro station as the terminus of the Blue Line extension, expected to open in 2027.

== Commuter train station ==
=== History ===
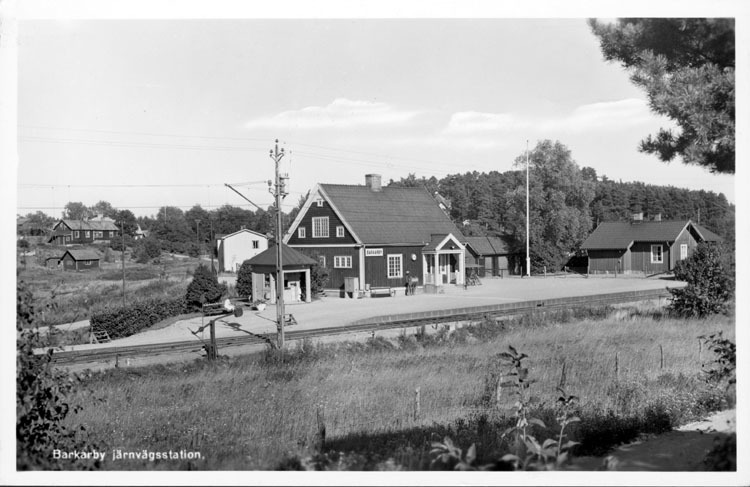
Barkarby in 1940

Barkarby station originally opened as a stop on the Stockholm-Västerås-Bergslagen Railway in 1878. Over the years, several station buildings were erected, the last of which was built in 1922 and demolished in 1969. In the 1960s, the station was reconstructed as a double-track commuter rail station, to accommodate the growing rail traffic. This station remained in operation until 2014.

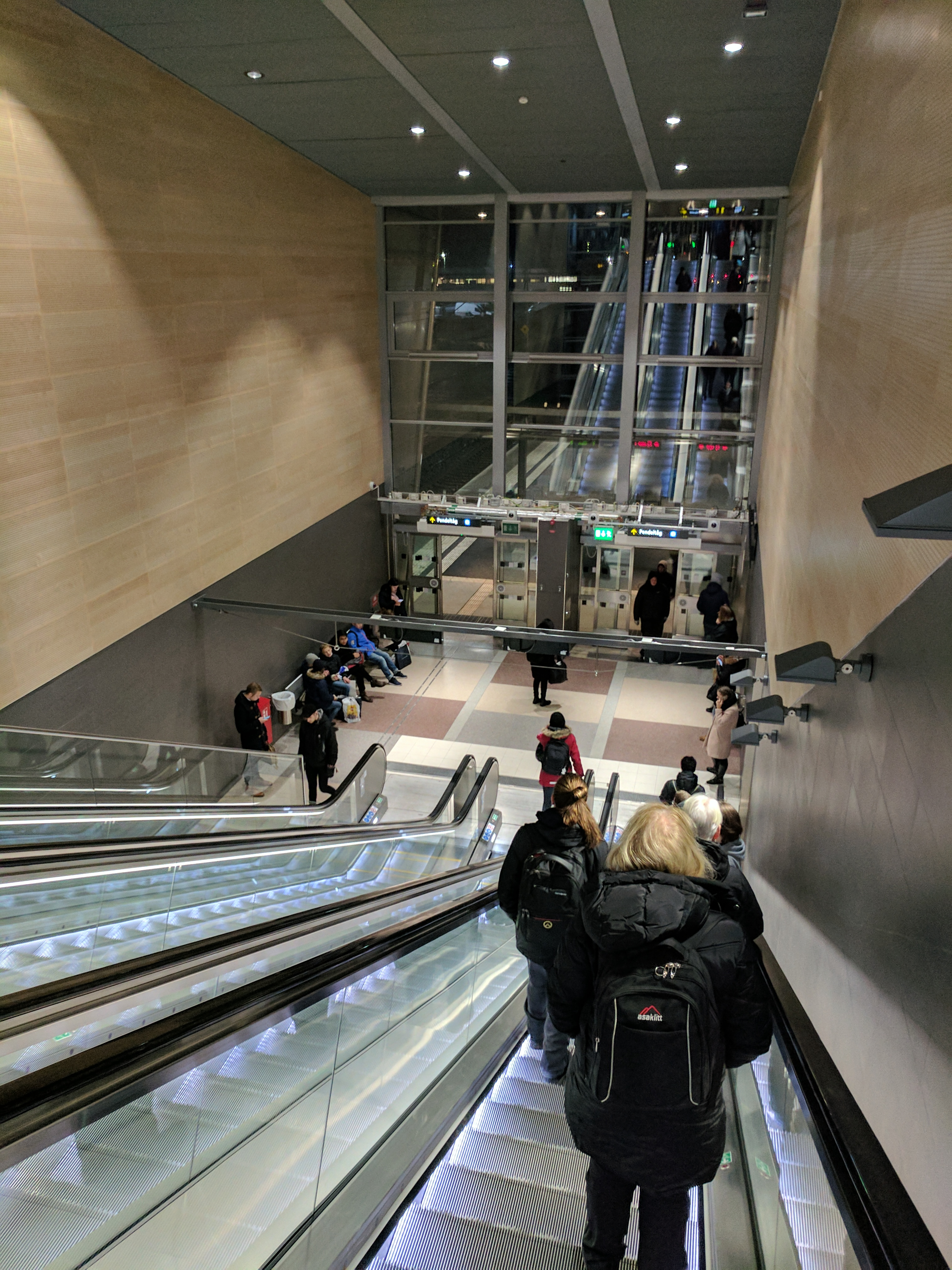
Southern entrance Interior in 2016

In 2016, a new station was constructed approximately 250 meters north of the old site, with temporary facilities in place during construction. As of 2026, Barkarby features a single operational central platform, with two additional tracks only used for passing freight and long-distance trains, with platforms for longer-distance regional trains are under construction. Previous plans existed to rename the station to Stockholm West and later to Järfälla Station, but were dropped by 2018. The station serves 4,900 boarding passengers per day, as of 2022.

=== Station upgrades ===
Barkarby station is currently undergoing upgrades as part of the large-scale Barkarbystaden development project. By 2027, new platforms for regional and long-distance trains will be completed. The station will also feature a new northern entrance on new Veddesta bridge and the newly built Barkarbystaden area, and a new bus station. The Veddesta Bridge exit has opened, but the regional trains will open in 2027.

The expansion includes increasing the number of tracks from two to four on the Tomteboda-Kallhäll section of the Mälaren line, which separates commuter rail traffic from regional and long-distance trains. Barkarby station will serve as a transport interchange, integrating commuter trains, regional trains, long-distance trains, and the Stockholm metro system, and buses.

== Metro station ==
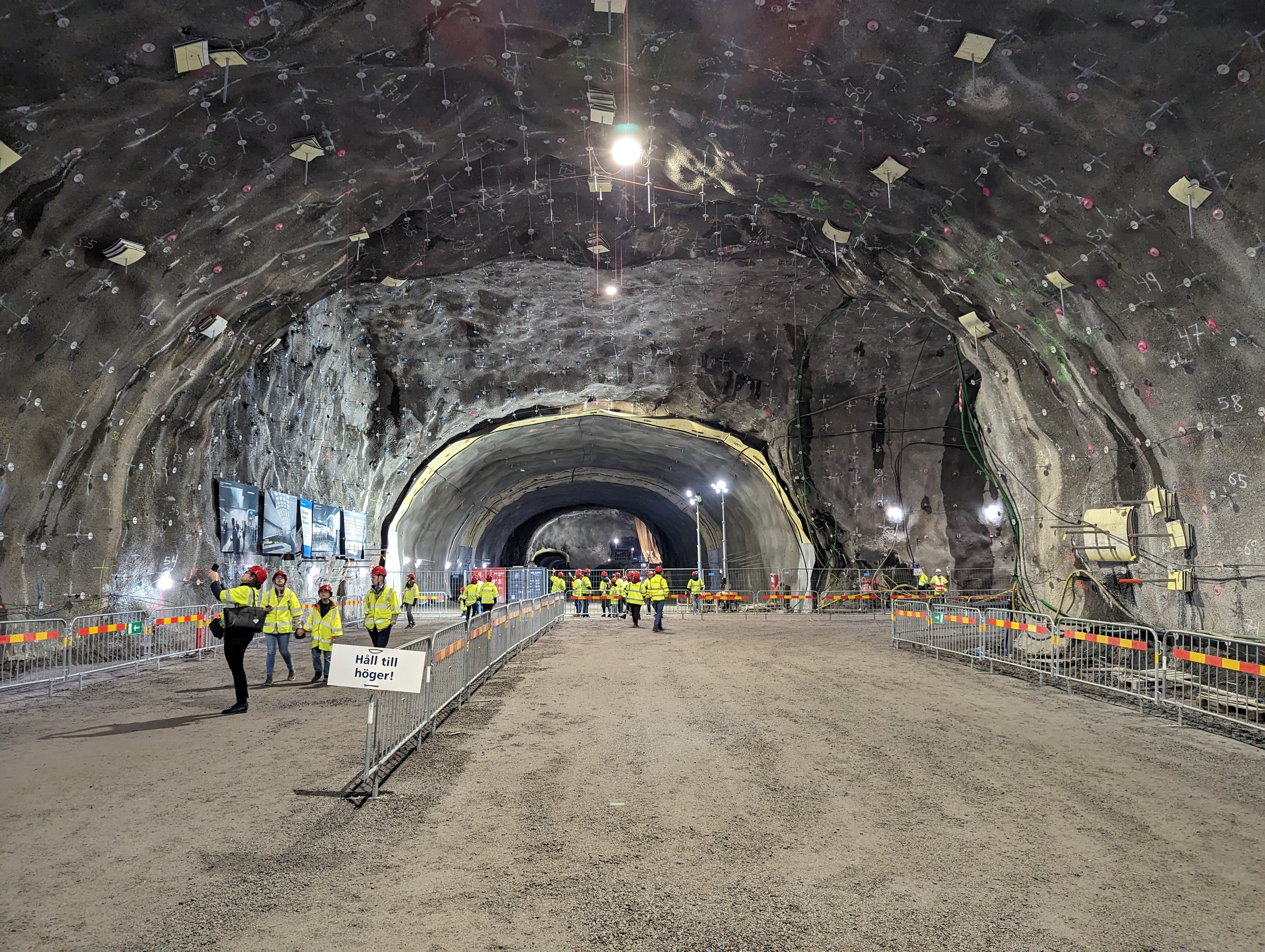
Construction of the metro station in 2023

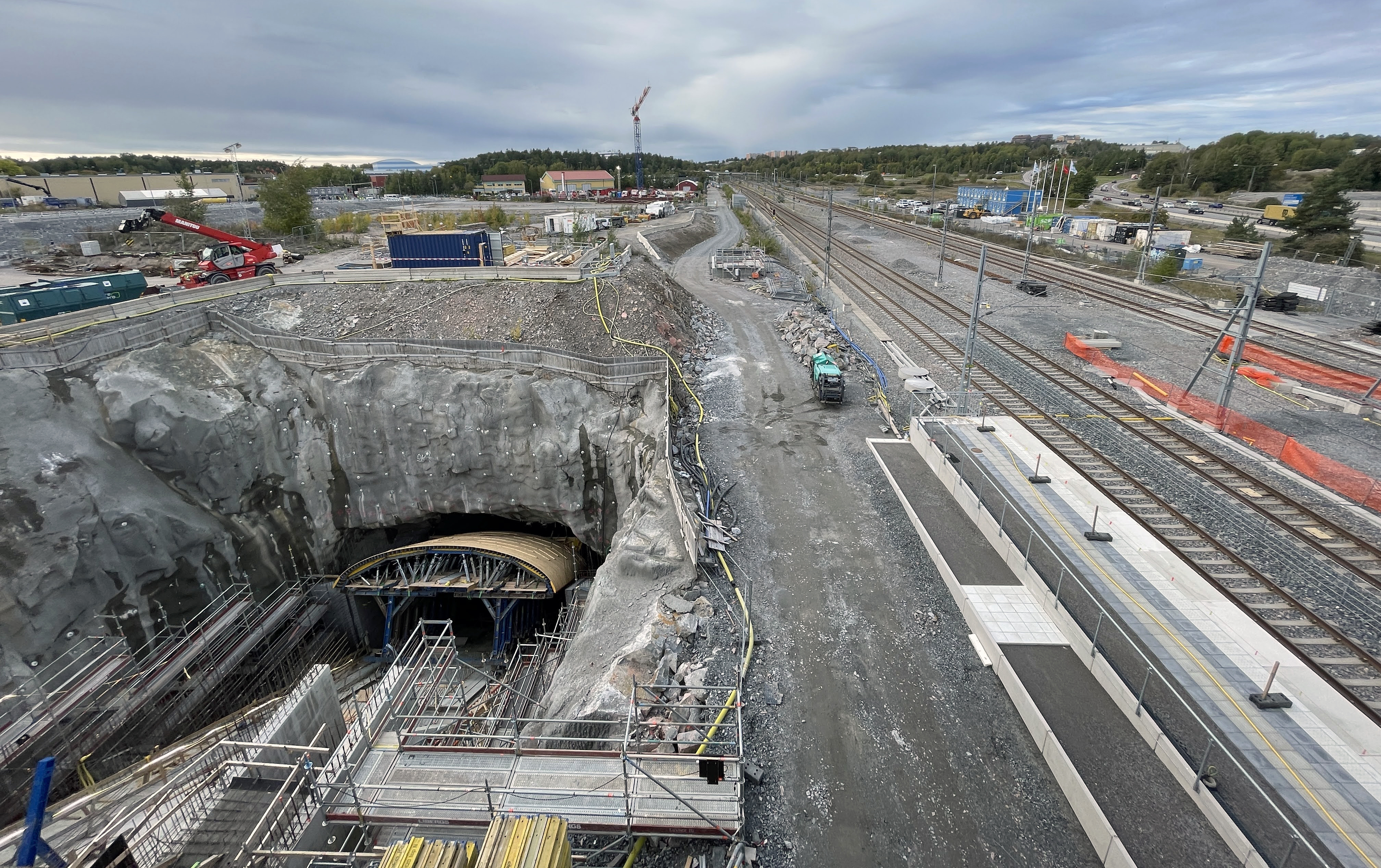
Metro station entrance under construction next to the new regional train platforms in 2024

Barkarby station will also be part of the Stockholm Metro, with the north-western extension of the Blue Line. The extension will add two stations: Barkarbystaden and Barkarby. This extension from Akalla Station will cover approximately 4 kilometers. The groundbreaking for the station took place in August 2018, and the line is expected to be completed by December 2027.

Barkarby Metro Station will have two entrances: one at the new northern entrance of the railway station on the Veddesta Bridge, connecting to the new bus terminal, and another on Veddestavägen. The station will be situated approximately 30 meters underground, featuring escalators and lifts for access to the platforms. Artist Irene Vestman has been commissioned to design the station's artwork.

== Bus station ==
A new bus station is also being constructed at Barkarby station, due to open in 2027 probably. The terminal will have 15 bus stands and will occupy 6,000 square meters, with 200 square meters allocated for indoor facilities such as a waiting area and shops. It will be located at the northern entrance of Barkarby station, replacing the current temporary bus stops at the southern entrance.

== See also ==
- Stockholm commuter rail
- Blue Line (Stockholm Metro)
