= Spånga railway station =

Railway station in Stockholm, Sweden

Spånga
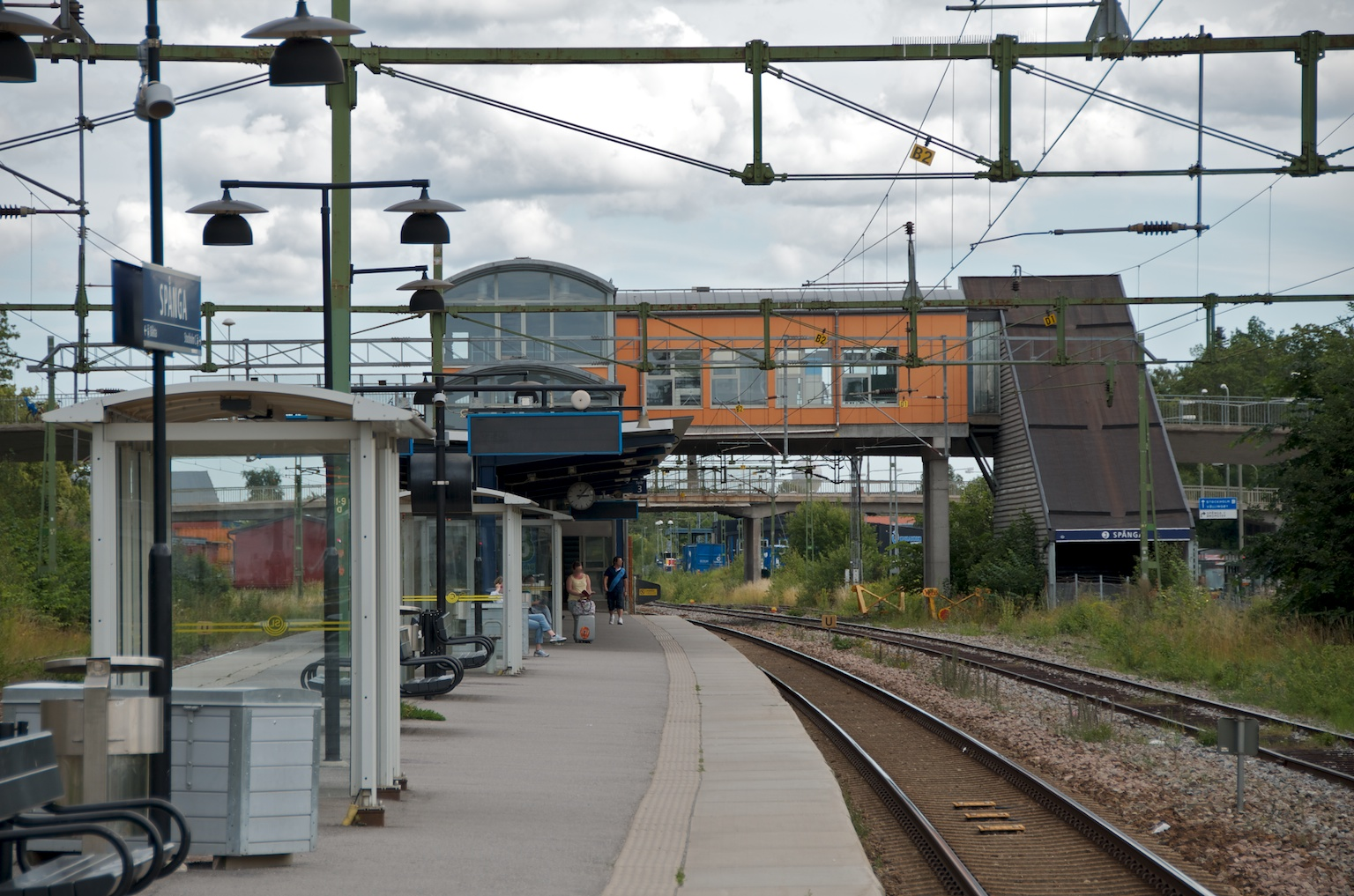
- Spånga station with the characteristic bridge over the railway

General information
- Location: Stockholm County
- Coordinates: 59°23′0″N 17°53′50″E
- System: Pendeltåg
- Owner: Swedish Transport Administration
- Platforms: 1
- Connections: Bus terminal

Construction
- Structure type: At-grade

Other information
- Station code: Spå

History
- Opened: 1876

Passengers
- 2015: 7,900 boarding per weekday (commuter rail)

Services
Preceding station	Stockholm commuter rail	Following station
Barkarby towards Bålsta	43	Sundbyberg towards Nynäshamn
Barkarby towards Kallhäll	43X	Sundbyberg towards Nynäshamn
Barkarby towards Bro	44	Sundbyberg towards Tumba
Location

Spånga is a station on the Stockholm commuter rail network located in the Solhem district of Västerort, within the Stockholm Municipality. The station is located on the Mälarbanan, 11.4 kilometers from Stockholm City railway station. The entrance, with a ticket hall, is located at the southern end of the platform and is accessed via a pedestrian bridge between the residential area of Solhöjden and Spånga Stationsplan. The station sees an average of 7,900 boardings on a typical winter weekday.

== History ==
The original station opened on December 15, 1876, when the Stockholm–Västerås–Bergslagen Railway was inaugurated. Initially, both long-distance and local trains to Kungsängen stopped here. In 1888, Spånga became a branch station for the line to Lövsta and Hässelby villastad. In 1908, a new station building designed by architect Erik Lallerstedt was constructed. This building was demolished in 1975 and replaced by a metal structure above the tracks. The platforms were rebuilt in conjunction with the expansion of the Mälarbanan to four tracks.

== Bus Terminal ==
Adjacent to the station is a bus terminal for buses within Västerort and surrounding areas, as well as night bus services. The buses see an average of 8,100 boardings per weekday.

== Gallery ==
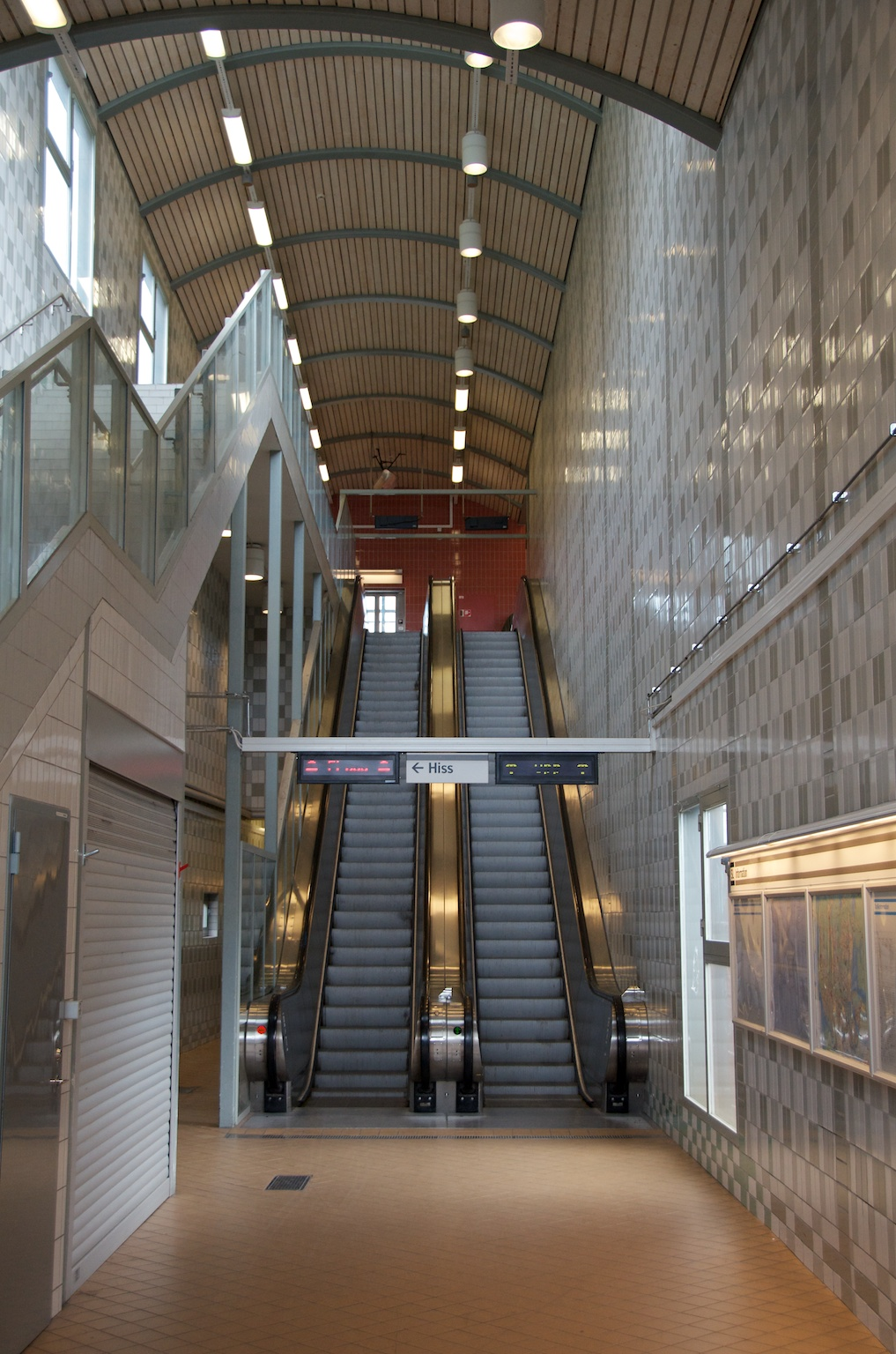
Escalators at Spånga station

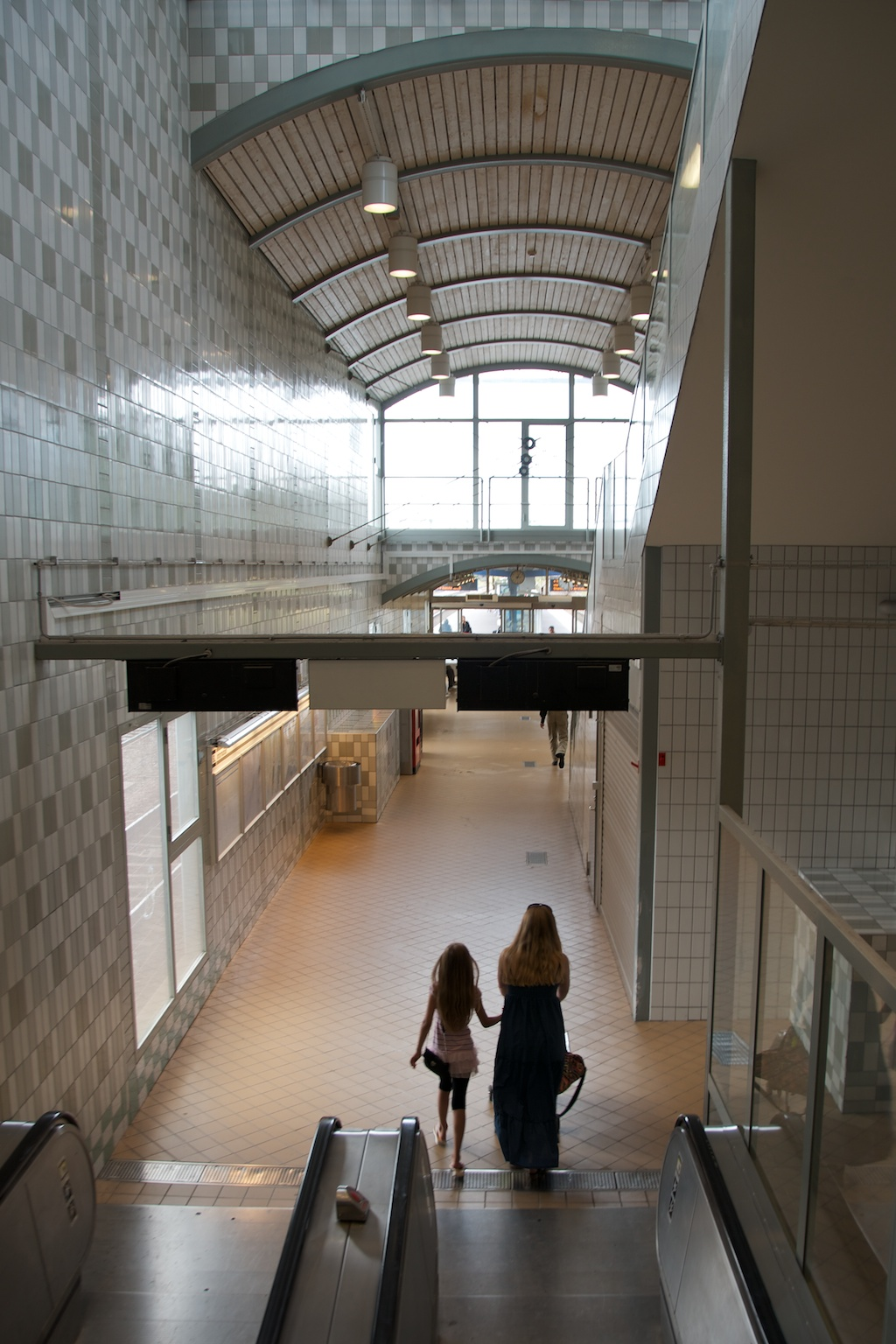
High ceiling in the waiting hall at Spånga station

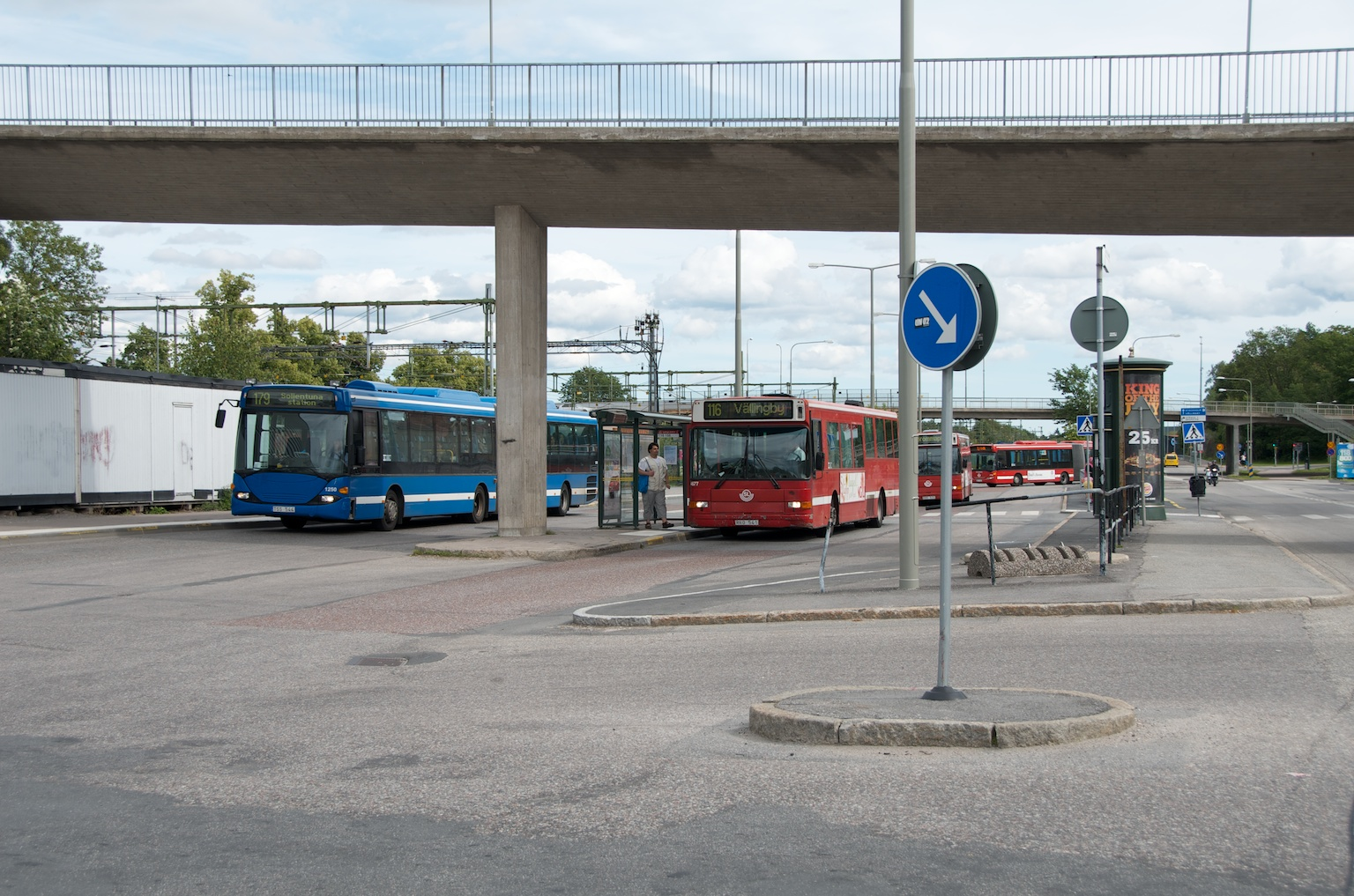
Bus station at Spånga station
