= Jakobsberg railway station =

Railway station in Stockholm, Sweden

Jakobsberg
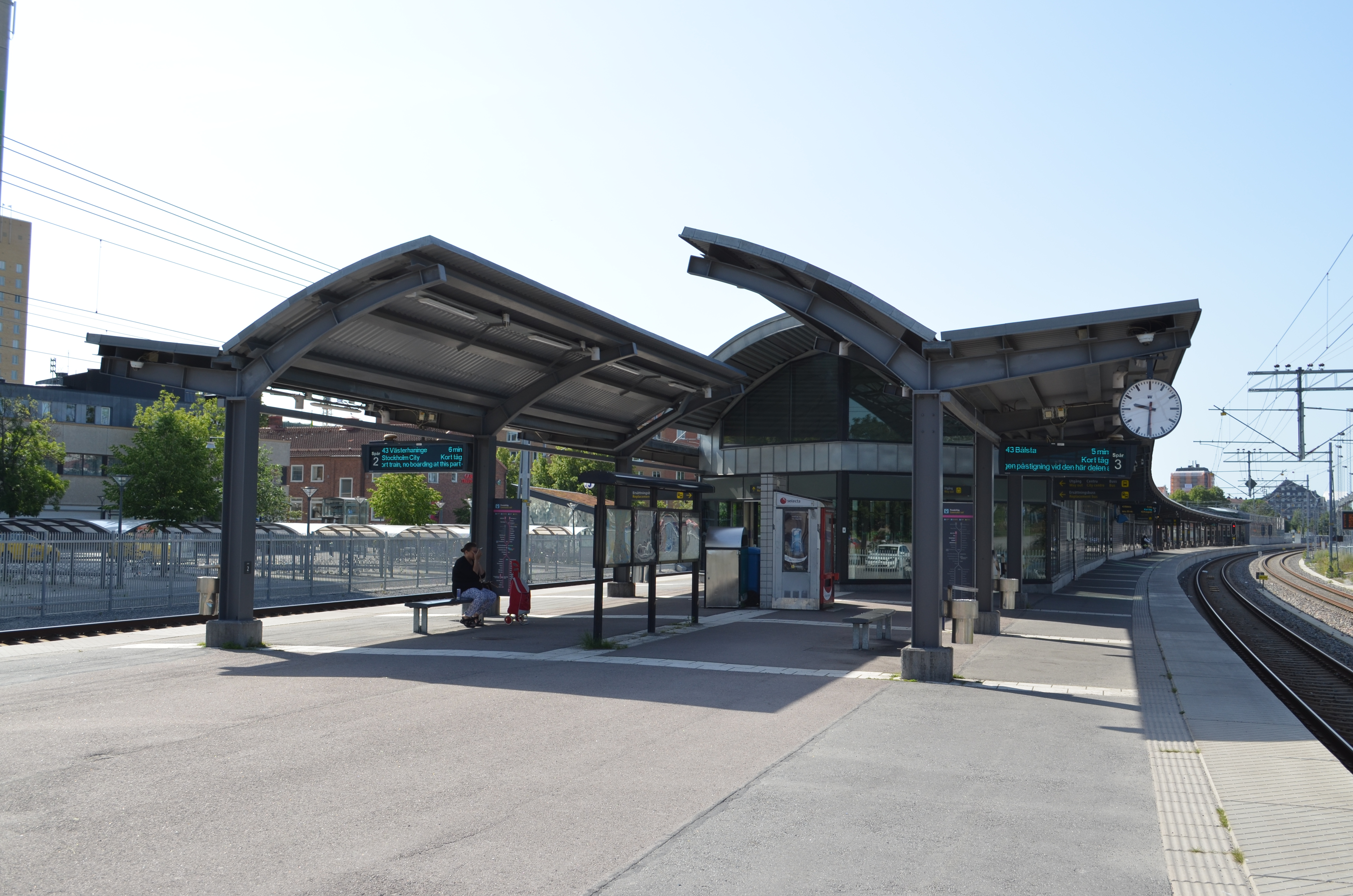
- Jakobsberg station

General information
- Location: Stockholm County
- Coordinates: 59°25′26″N 17°49′58″E
- System: Pendeltåg
- Owner: Swedish Transport Administration
- Platforms: 1
- Connections: Jakobsbergs bus terminal

Construction
- Structure type: At-grade

Other information
- Station code: Jkb

History
- Opened: 1876

Passengers
- 2015: 10,200 boarding per weekday (commuter rail)

Services
Preceding station	Stockholm commuter rail	Following station
Kallhäll towards Bålsta	43	Barkarby towards Nynäshamn
Kallhäll Terminus	43X	Barkarby towards Nynäshamn
Kallhäll towards Bro	44	Barkarby towards Tumba
Location

Jakobsbergs station is a station on the Stockholm commuter rail network located in Jakobsberg, Järfälla Municipality, 17.4 kilometers from Stockholm City. The station sees an average of 10,200 boardings on a typical weekday.

== History ==
The station opened in 1876 when the Västeråsbanan (Stockholm–Köping Railway) was inaugurated. Initially, Jakobsberg was served by long-distance trains, but it later became part of the Stockholm commuter rail network. In 1961, a pedestrian tunnel was built from the city center to the platform. Another tunnel to the Kvarnplansidan was added in 1971. The original station building, which had opened in 1876, was replaced by a new structure in 2005 designed by Helena Rönnkvist.

The station was expanded twice, once in 1980 and again in 2005. It was awarded the Järfälla Kommun's byggnadsmärke in 2006 for its contribution to good building culture.

== Expansion Projects ==
Currently (2021), a major expansion project is underway to add additional tracks to the station. This expansion will increase the capacity of the station and is part of a broader project to expand the Mälarbanan from two to four tracks, enhancing service and reducing congestion.

== Gallery ==
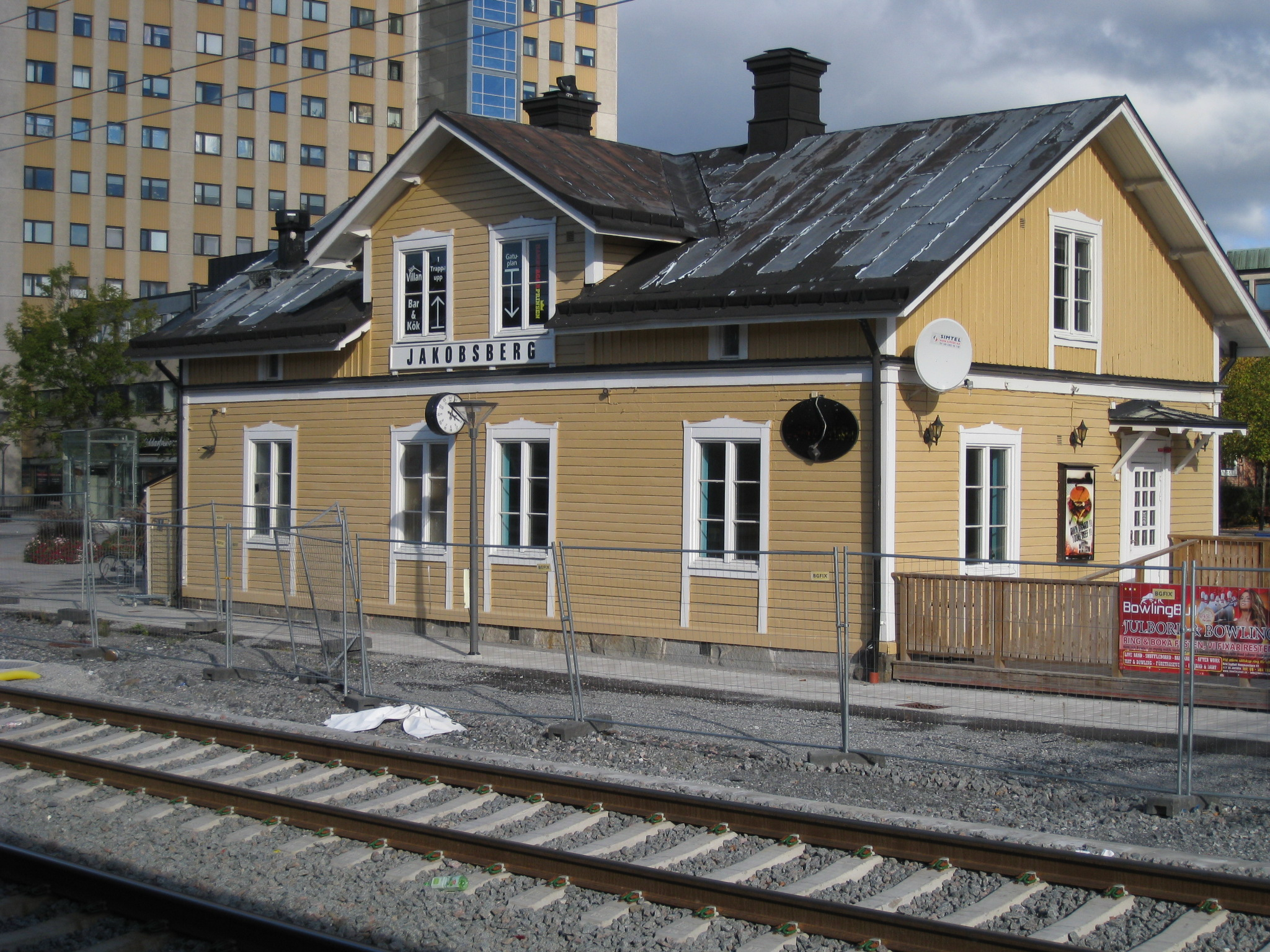
The old Jakobsberg station building, built in 1876

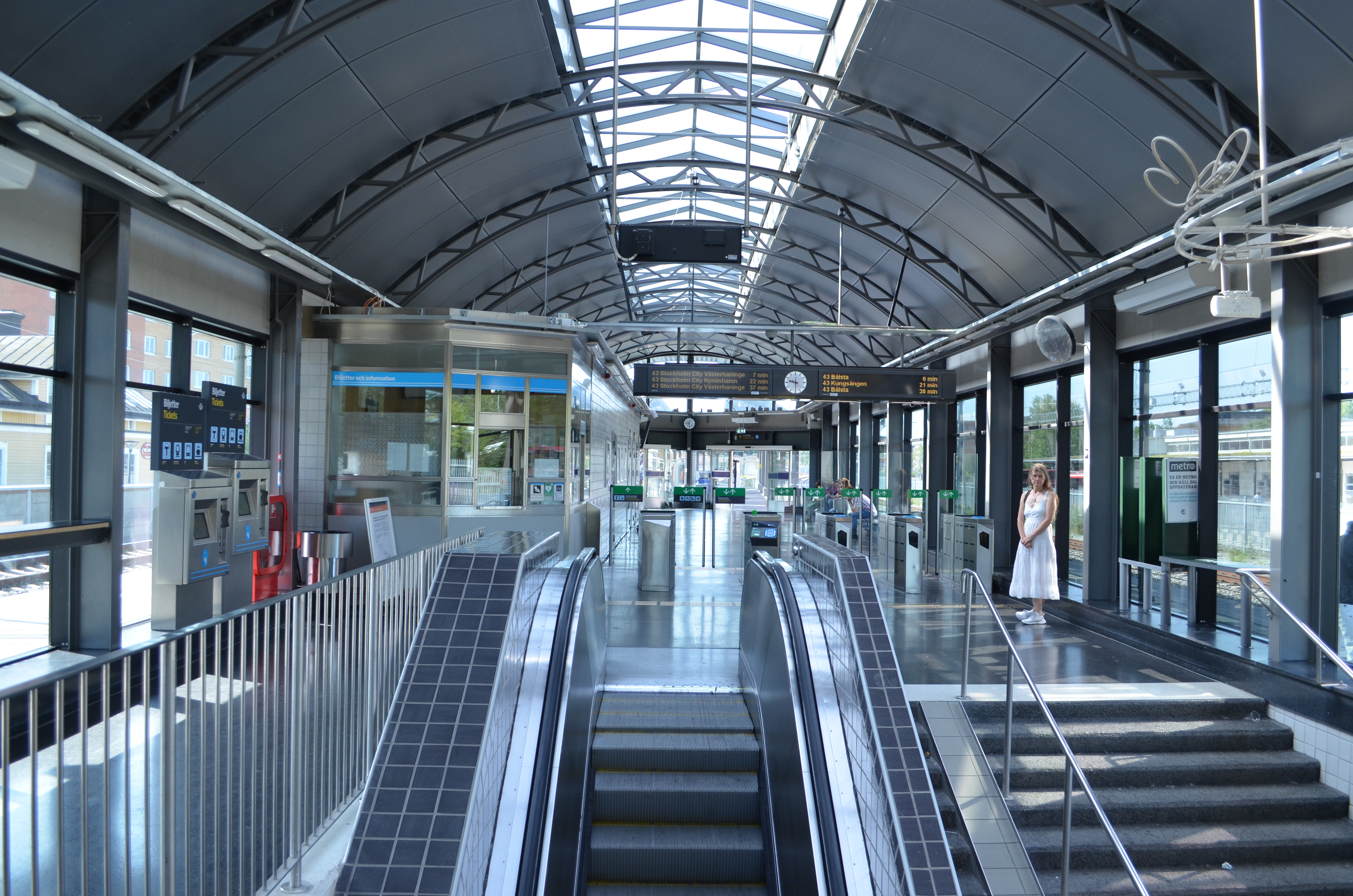
Inside the station

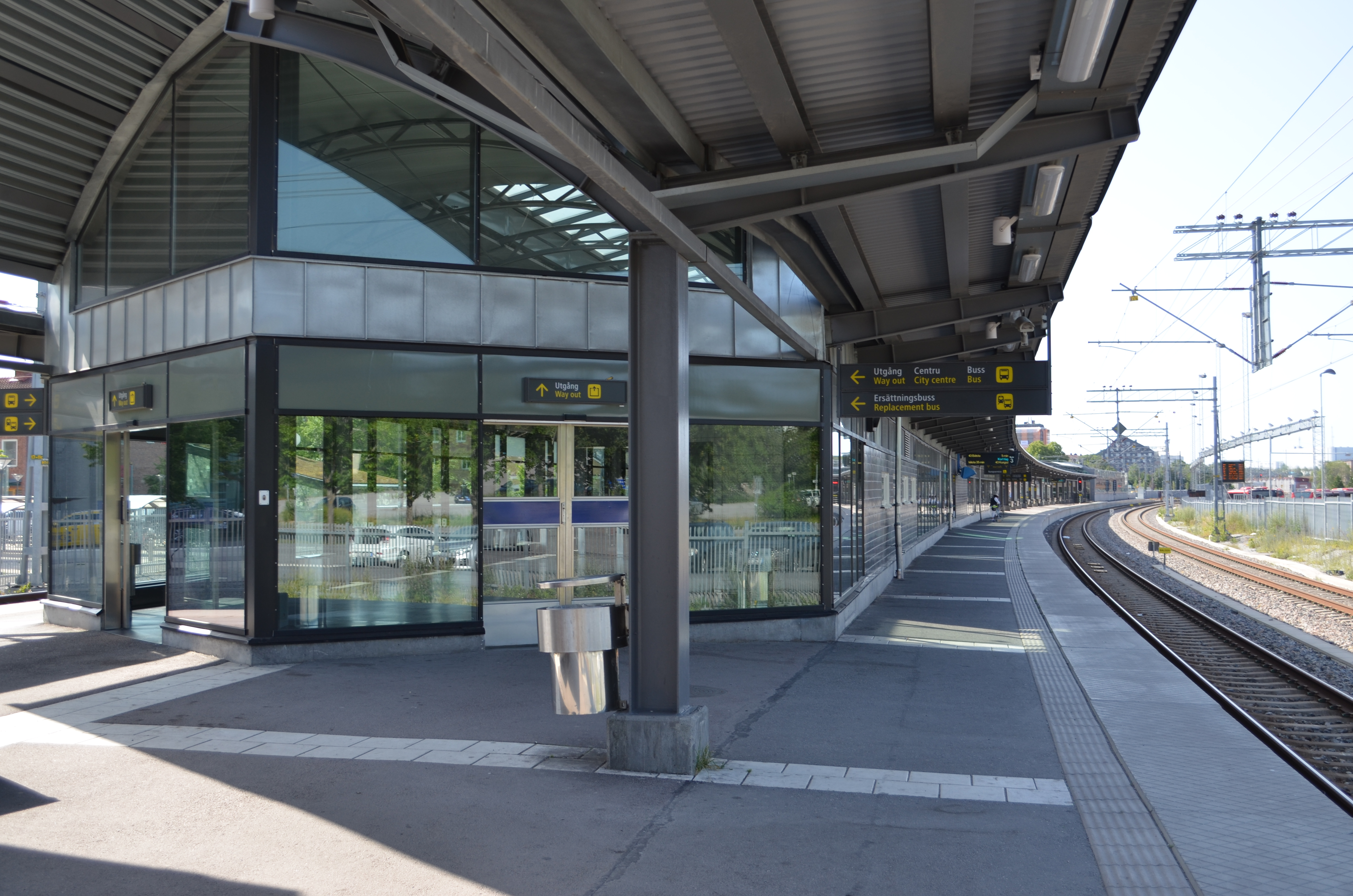
The platform at Jakobsberg station

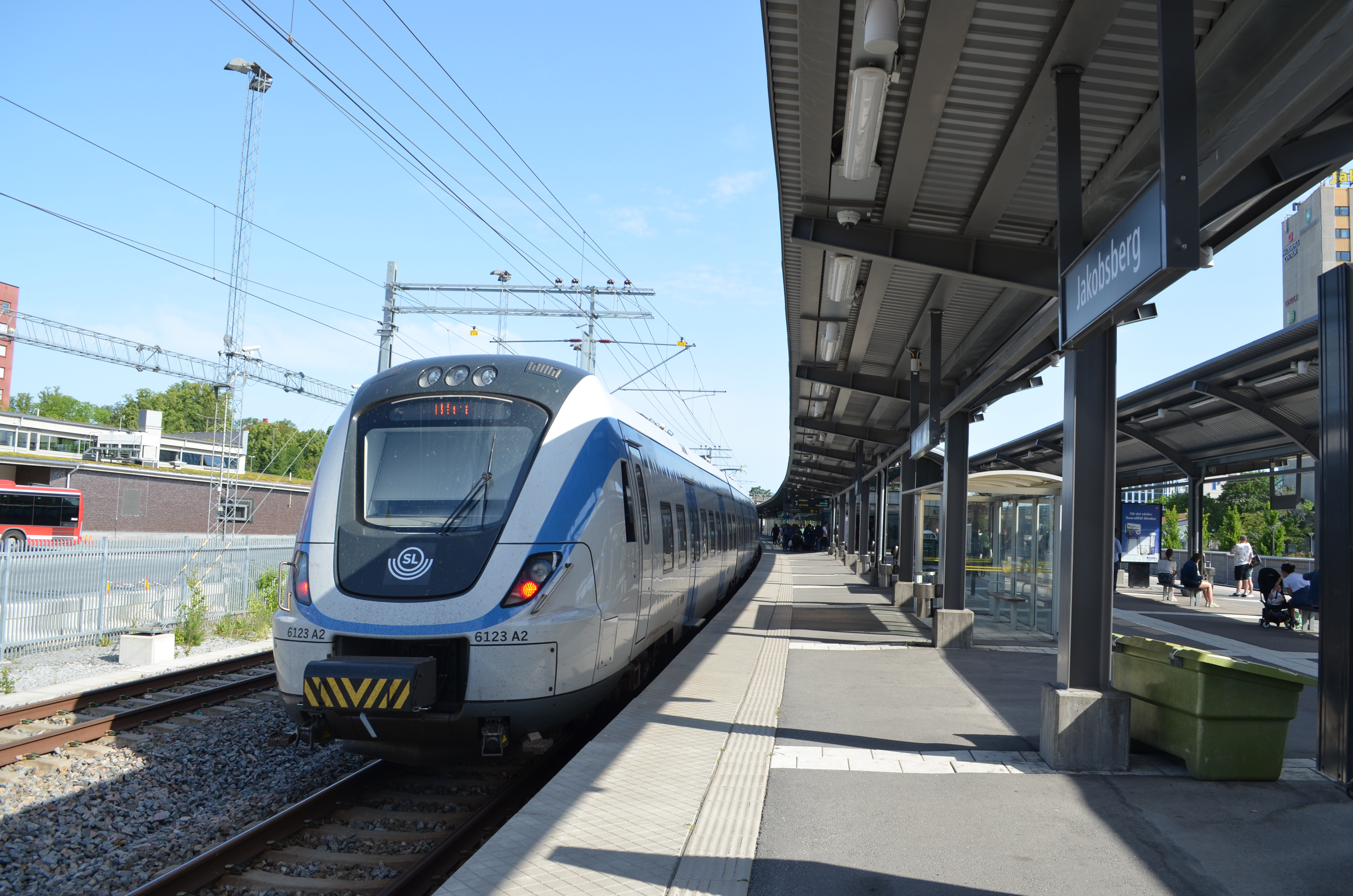
Jakobsberg station in June 2019

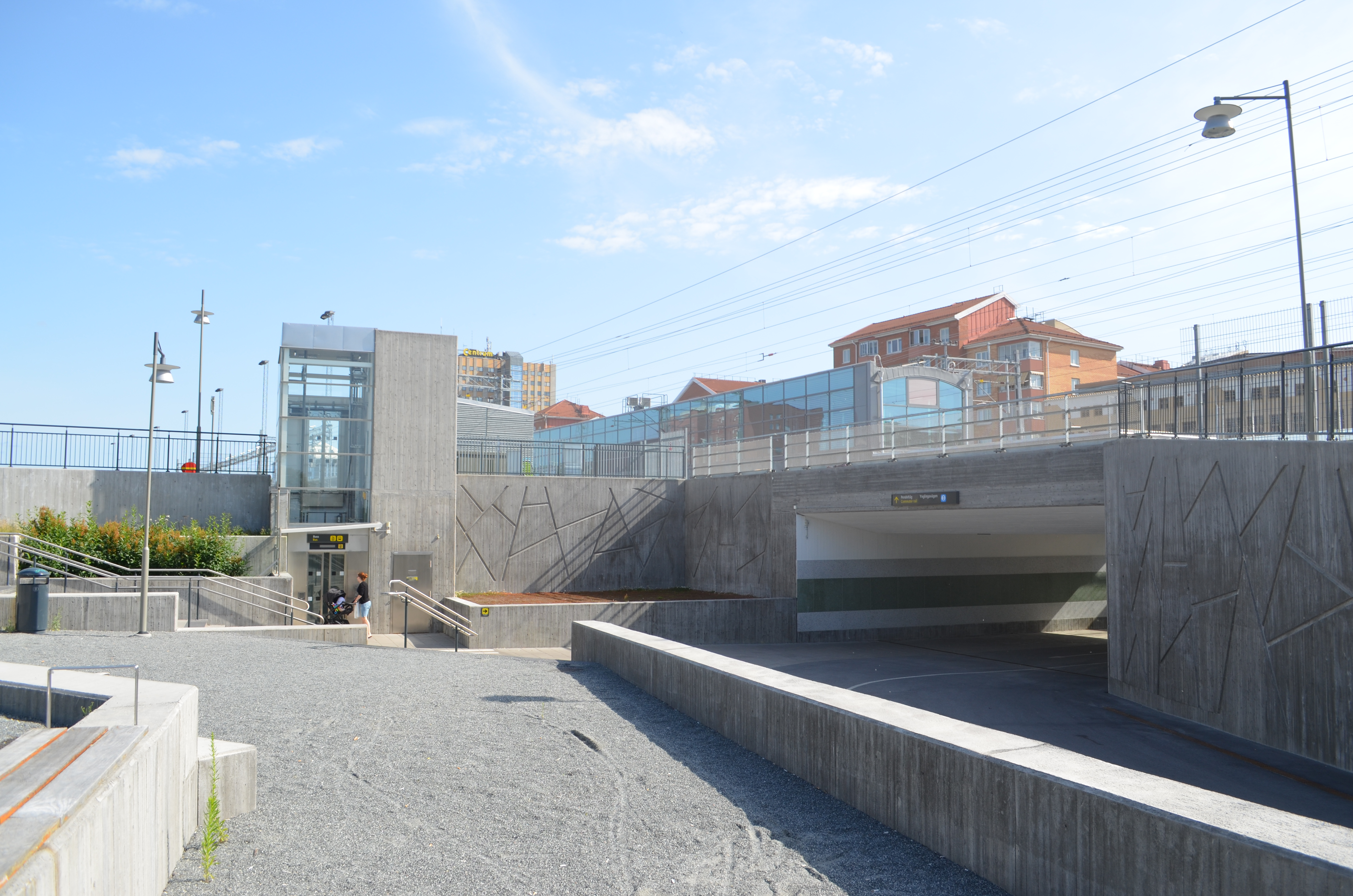
The new southern entrance with escalators, stairs, and waiting area
