= Barkarby Airport =

Former airport in Akalla

- IATA: none; ICAO: ESKB

Summary
- Airport type: Public
- Operator: Barkarby Flying Club
- Location: Akalla
- Elevation AMSL: 50 ft (15 m)
- Coordinates: 59°24′57″N 17°53′21″E
- Interactive map of Barkarby Airport

Runways
Direction	Length		Surface
Direction	ft	m	Surface
06/24	3,248	990	Asphalt

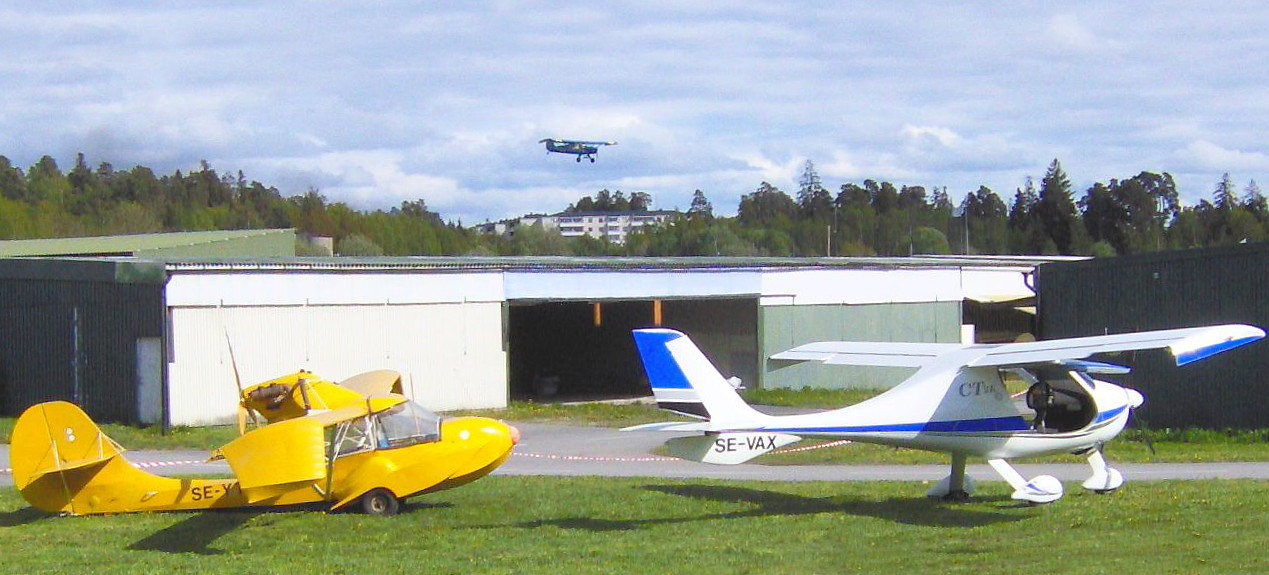

Barkarby Airport (IATA: N/A, ICAO: ESKB) was a disbanded Swedish Air Force base, near Akalla north of Stockholm used for general aviation. Barkarby Airport was one of Sweden’s oldest active airports until it was closed in 2010. A large shopping complex is still situated close to – and partly on – the airfield. Current plans are to construct houses, apartments and offices on large parts of the airfield. December 2008 was due to be the last commercial flight date, after which houses were due to be built. Due to legal complexities about the cancellation of the contract, however, the airport was open for another two years. The airport was finally closed in June 2010.

Barkarby airport was the location used to photograph the 1976 cover of the ABBA album, Arrival. The members of the Swedish group are seen sitting in a helicopter on the ground at Barkarby, and on the reverse the helicopter is seen arriving.

== See also ==
- List of the largest airports in the Nordic countries
- Barkarbystaden
