= When Michael Calls =

- Genre: Horror; Thriller
- Based on: When Michael Calls by John Farris
- Written by: James Bridges
- Directed by: Philip Leacock
- Starring: Ben Gazzara; Elizabeth Ashley; Michael Douglas
- Country of origin: United States
- Original language: English

Production
- Executive producer: Edgar J. Scherick
- Producer: Gil Shiva
- Cinematography: Reginald H. Morris; Donald Wilder
- Editor: P.A. James
- Running time: 73 minutes
- Production companies: 20th Century Fox Television; Palomar Pictures

Original release
- Network: ABC
- Release: February 5, 1972

When Michael Calls is a 1972 American made-for-television horror thriller film directed by Philip Leacock and starring Elizabeth Ashley, Ben Gazzara and Michael Douglas. It was adapted from John Farris's 1967 novel of the same name and broadcast as an ABC Movie of the Week.

== Plot ==
Helen Connelly is a woman whose nephew Michael died 15 years earlier. She is separated from her husband, Doremus. She is close to Michael's brother, Craig. When mysterious happenings began taking place and she begins receiving phone calls from the supposedly dead Michael, Helen begins to wonder if Michael is really dead or if she is losing touch with reality.

== Cast ==
- Ben Gazzara as Doremus Connelly
- Elizabeth Ashley as Helen Connelly
- Michael Douglas as Craig
- Marian Waldman as Elsa Britton
- Karen Pearson as Peggy Connelly
- Larry Reynolds as Dr. Britton
- Al Waxman as Sheriff Hap Washbrook
- Alan McRae as Harry Randall
- Chris Pellett as Peter
- Steve Weston as Enoch Mills
- Robert Warner as Sam
- John Bethune as Quinlan
- William Osler as Prof. Swen
- Michèle Chicoine as Amy

== Release ==
The television film was first broadcast as an ABC Movie of the Week on February 5, 1972.

== Reception ==
Rob Hunter wrote at Film School Rejects:

When Michael Calls is an adaptation of a Farris novel, and while it's neither the first of his books to receive that treatment (Because They're Young, 1960) nor the most well-known (The Fury, 1978), it's still a terrific little chiller every bit as deserving of attention. The premise is rife with possibility — revenge, madness, ghostly shenanigans — and it’s really only let down with the fairly obvious nature of the culprit's identity.

Even knowing (or strongly suspecting) who the guilty party is, though, doesn't hurt the film's creepy effect. Michael's calls — the high-pitched voice feels simultaneously childish and adult-like — deliver chills, and once we start catching glimpses of a mysterious boy things grow both mysterious and thrilling. One man is overcome by bees, the sheriff's body falls dead from the ceiling in front of a bunch of schoolchildren, a figure tries to burn Doremus alive, and soon it's Helen's turn to face Michael.

== Home media ==
The film has been released on VHS and DVD by various small labels. It also appears under the title Shattered Silence.
