= Ben Gazzara =

American actor (1930–2012)

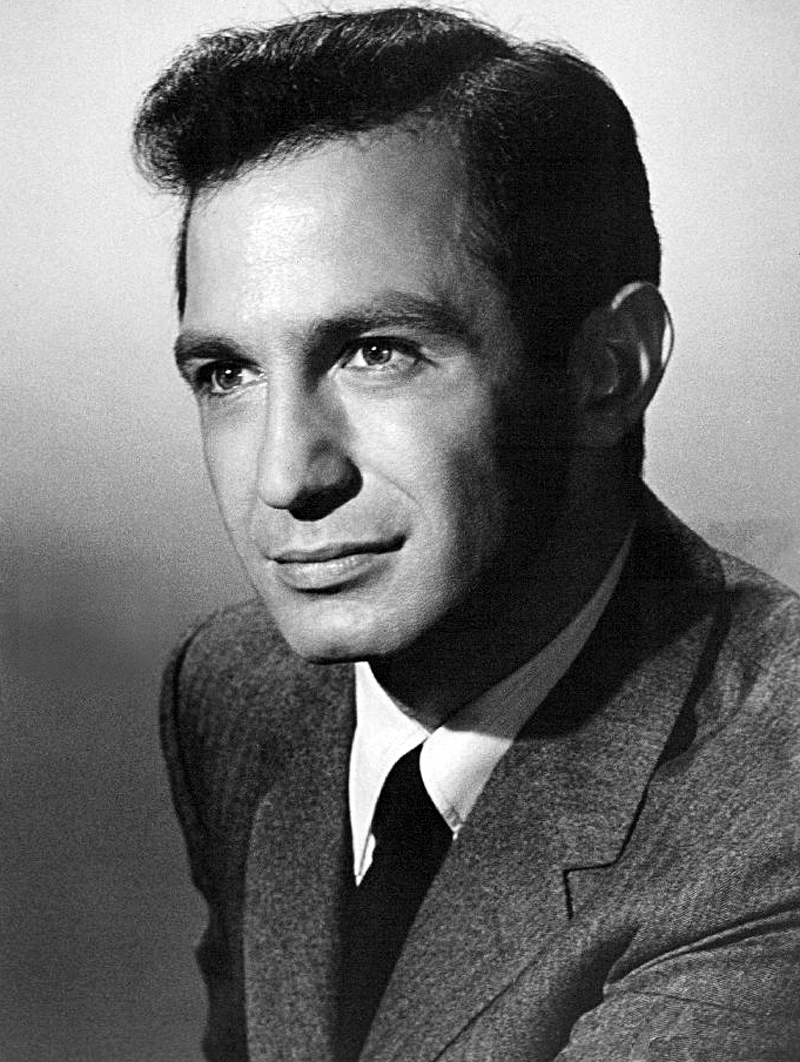
- Gazzara in the 1960s
- Born: Biagio Anthony Gazzarra; August 28, 1930; New York City, New York, U.S.
- Died: February 3, 2012 (aged 81); New York City, New York, U.S.
- Occupations: Actor; director
- Years active: 1953–2012
- Spouses: Louise Erickson (m. 1951; div. 1957); Janice Rule (m. 1961; div. 1979); Elke Krivat (m. 1982)
- Children: 2
- Awards: See below

Biagio Anthony "Ben" Gazzara (né Gazzarra; August 28, 1930 – February 3, 2012) was an American actor and director of film, stage, and television. He received numerous accolades including a Primetime Emmy Award and a Drama Desk Award, in addition to nominations for three Golden Globe Awards and three Tony Awards.

Born in New York City, Gazzara studied at The New School and began his professional career with the Actors Studio, of which he was a lifelong member. His breakthrough role was in the Broadway play Cat on a Hot Tin Roof (1955–56), which earned him widespread acclaim. A memorable performance as a soldier on trial for murder in Otto Preminger's Anatomy of a Murder (1959) transitioned Gazzara to an equally successful screen career. As the star of the television series Run for Your Life (1965–68), he was nominated for three Golden Globe Awards and two Emmy Awards. He won his only Emmy Award for the television film Hysterical Blindness (2002).

Gazzara was a recurring collaborator of John Cassavetes, working with him on Husbands (1970), The Killing of a Chinese Bookie (1976) and Opening Night (1977). His other best-known films include The Bridge at Remagen (1969), Capone (1975), Voyage of the Damned (1976), Saint Jack (1979), Road House (1989), The Spanish Prisoner (1997), The Big Lebowski, Buffalo '66, Happiness (all 1998), The Thomas Crown Affair, Summer of Sam (both 1999), Dogville (2003) and Paris, je t'aime (2006). He also had a successful and prolific film career in Europe, particularly Italy, where he worked with eminent directors including Giuseppe Tornatore, Giuliano Montaldo, Marco Ferreri, and Lars von Trier.

Gazzara was known for his gritty, naturalistic portrayals of intense, often amoral characters. According to The Hollywood Reporter, "Gazzara positioned himself for 'creative elbow room,' seeking edgy characters in non-mainstream productions or infusing mainstream productions with idiosyncratic supporting turns."

== Early life and education ==
Gazzara was born to Sicilian immigrant parents in New York City in 1930. He grew up in Manhattan's Kips Bay neighborhood; living on East 29th Street. He participated in the drama program at Madison Square Boys & Girls Club located across the street. He attended Stuyvesant High School but finally graduated from Saint Simon Stock in the Bronx. Years later, he said that the discovery of his love for acting saved him from a life of crime during his teen years.

He went to City College of New York to study electrical engineering. After two years, he abandoned the subject and took classes in acting at the Dramatic Workshop of The New School in New York with the influential German director Erwin Piscator and afterward joined the Actors Studio.

== Career ==
=== Early career ===
Gazzara guest-starred in shows including Treasury Men in Action and Danger. He received acclaim for his off-Broadway performance in End as a Man in 1953. The production was transferred to Broadway and ran until 1954.

In 1954, Gazzara (having modified his original surname from "Gazzarra") made several appearances in NBC's legal drama Justice, based on case studies from the Legal Aid Society of New York. He also guest-starred on shows including Medallion Theatre and The United States Steel Hour.

=== Broadway success ===
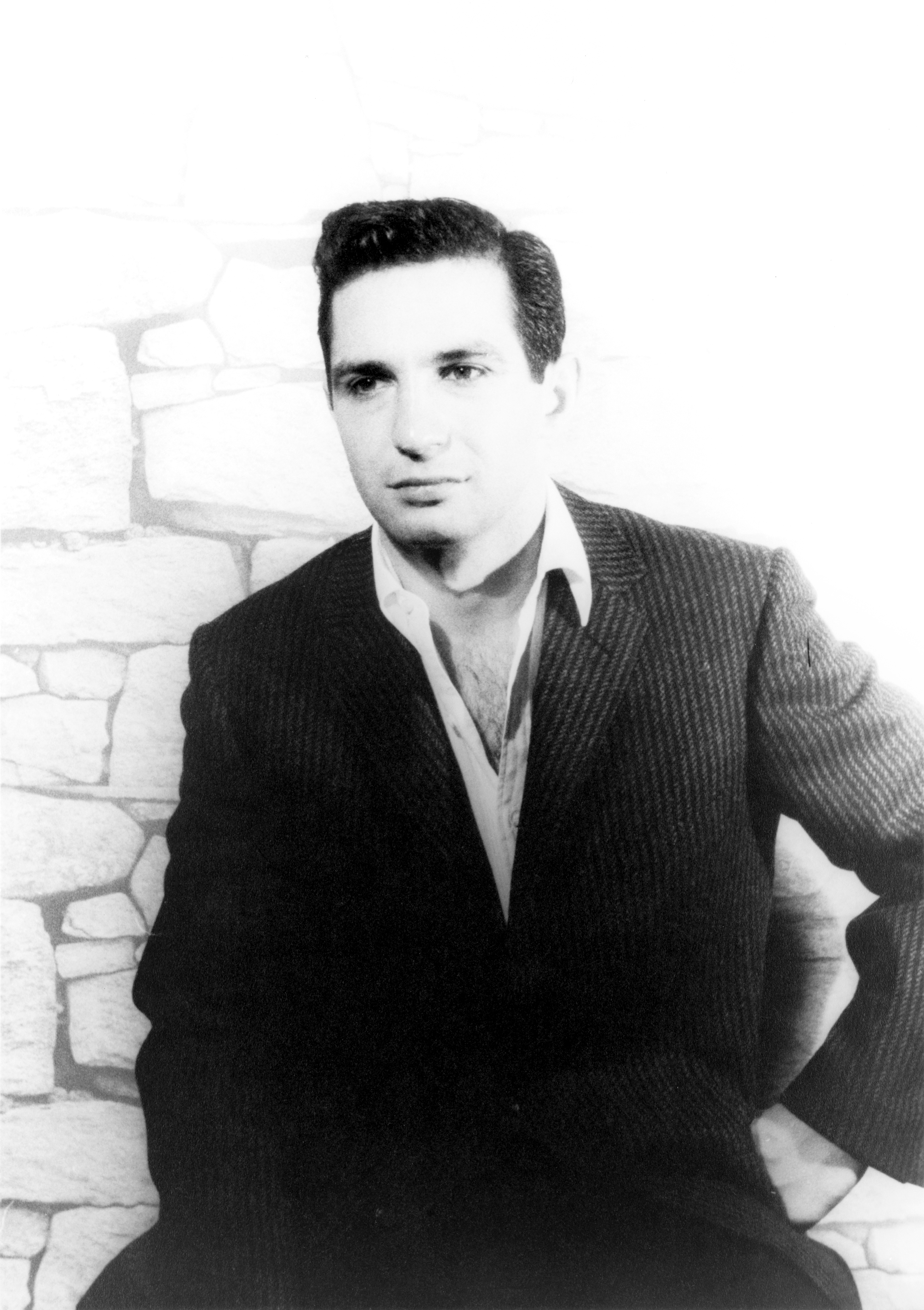
Gazzara, photographed by Carl Van Vechten in 1955

Gazzara became a Broadway sensation when he portrayed the role of Brick in Tennessee Williams's Cat on a Hot Tin Roof (1955–56) opposite Barbara Bel Geddes, directed by Elia Kazan. Gazzara turned down the role in the film version. The studio planned to offer the role to James Dean, but the part was given to Paul Newman after Dean's death.

He followed it with another long run in A Hatful of Rain (1956). Gazzara was in the 1963 Actors Studio production of Strange Interlude on Broadway.

=== Film work ===
He joined other Actors Studio members in the 1957 film The Strange One produced by Sam Spiegel. He had a Broadway flop with The Night Circus (1958) and continued to guest-star on shows like Playhouse 90, Kraft Television Theatre, Armchair Theatre and DuPont Show of the Month. His second film was a high-profile performance as a soldier on trial for avenging his wife's rape in Otto Preminger's courtroom drama Anatomy of a Murder (1959).

Gazzara told Charlie Rose in 1998 that he went from being mainly a stage actor who often would turn up his nose at film roles in the mid-1950s to, much later, a ubiquitous character actor who turned very little down. "When I became hot, so to speak, in the theater, I got a lot of offers", he said. "I won't tell you the pictures I turned down, because you'll say, 'You are a fool'—and I was a fool." He went to Italy to make a comedy, The Passionate Thief (1960), with Anna Magnani and Totò.

Back in the US he did a TV movie, Cry Vengeance!, and was second-billed in The Young Doctors (both 1961). He was also the mystery guest on What's My Line? (September 6, 1961). He starred in Convicts 4 (1962). He returned to Italy to make The Captive City (1962) with David Niven. Gazzara was the male lead in A Rage to Live (1965) with Suzanne Pleshette.

=== Television star ===
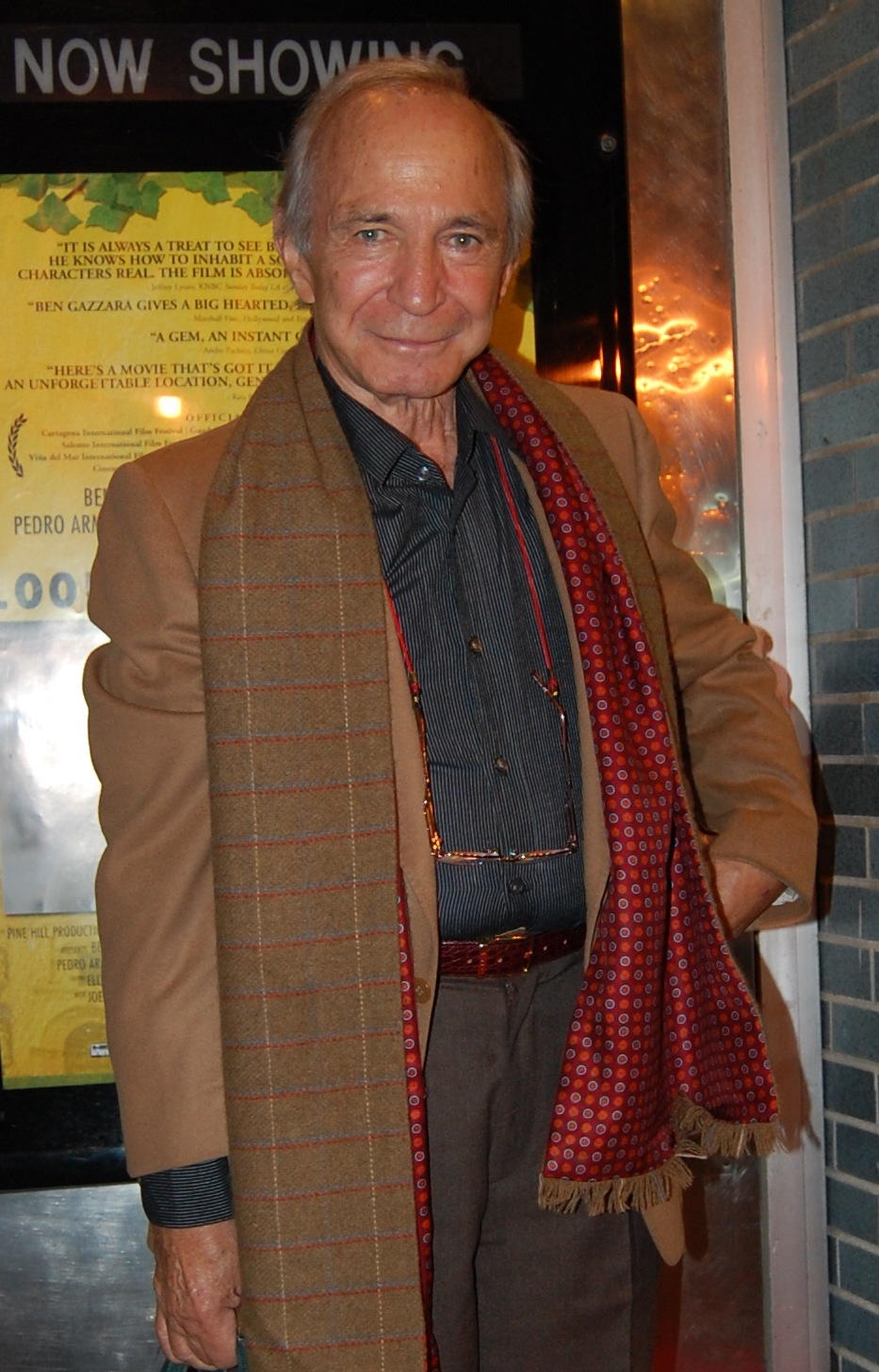
Gazzara at the premiere of Looking for Palladin in Greenwich Village, October 30, 2009

Gazzara became well known in several television series, beginning with Arrest and Trial, which ran from 1963 to 1964 on ABC. He also appeared in the TV special A Carol for Another Christmas (1964) and had a short Broadway run in A Traveller without Luggage in 1964. He also guest-starred on Kraft Suspense Theatre.

He gained fame in the TV series Run for Your Life which ran from 1965 to 1968 on NBC, in which he played a terminally ill man trying to get the most out of the last two years of his life. For his work in the series, Gazzara received two Emmy nominations for "Outstanding Lead Actor in a Drama Series" and three Golden Globe nominations for "Best Performance by an Actor in a Television Series – Drama." When the series ended Gazzara had a cameo in If It's Tuesday, This Must Be Belgium (1969) and a lead in the wartime action film The Bridge at Remagen (1969).

=== John Cassavetes ===
Some of the actor's most formidable characters were those he created with his friend John Cassavetes in the 1970s. They collaborated for the first time on Cassavetes's film Husbands (1970), in which he appeared alongside Peter Falk and Cassavetes. Gazzara starred in a television movie, Pursuit (1972), the directorial debut of Michael Crichton. He also made the television movies When Michael Calls (1972), Fireball Forward (1972), and The Family Rico (1972). He acted in The Sicilian Connection (1972) in Italy, and did a science fiction film The Neptune Factor (1973). There were more television films, You'll Never See Me Again (1973) and Maneater (1973).

He starred in the television miniseries QB VII (1974), which won six primetime Emmy Awards. The six-and-a-half-hour series was based on a book by Leon Uris and co-starred Anthony Hopkins. He then played gangster Al Capone in the biographical film Capone (1975). Cassavetes was in the support cast. Gazzara appeared on Broadway in Hughie (1975) then worked again for Cassavetes as director in The Killing of a Chinese Bookie (1976), in which Gazzara took the leading role of the hapless strip-joint owner, Cosmo Vitelli. He starred in an action movie, High Velocity (1976), and was one of many stars in Voyage of the Damned (1976).

Gazzara returned to Broadway for a production of Who's Afraid of Virginia Woolf? with Colleen Dewhurst in 1976. A year later, he starred in yet another Cassavetes-directed movie, Opening Night, as stage director Manny Victor, who struggles with the mentally unstable star of his show, played by Cassavetes' wife Gena Rowlands. He made an acclaimed TV movie The Death of Richie (1977).

=== Peter Bogdanovich ===
Gazzara's career received a boost when Peter Bogdanovich cast him in the title role of Saint Jack (1979). His increased profile helped him be cast in the male lead of Bloodline (1979) and the Korean War epic Inchon (1980) co-starring Laurence Olivier and Richard Roundtree.

He made another movie for Bogdanovich, They All Laughed (1981).

=== 1980s–1990s ===
Gazzara made some films in Europe: Tales of Ordinary Madness (1981), The Girl from Trieste (1982), A Proper Scandal (1984), My Dearest Son (1985). He starred with Rowlands in the critically acclaimed AIDS-themed TV movie An Early Frost (1985), for which he received his third Emmy nomination. He had a villainous role in the oft-televised Patrick Swayze film Road House, which the actor jokingly said is probably his most-watched performance.

Gazzara appeared in 38 films, many for television, in the 1990s. He worked with a number of renowned directors, such as the Coen brothers (The Big Lebowski), Spike Lee (Summer of Sam), David Mamet (The Spanish Prisoner), Walter Hugo Khouri (Forever), Vincent Gallo (Buffalo '66), Todd Solondz (Happiness), John Turturro (Illuminata), and John McTiernan (The Thomas Crown Affair). He was on Broadway in Shimada (1992). In his seventies, Gazzara continued to work. In 2003, he appeared in Nobody Don't Like Yogi, an off-Broadway play by Tom Lysaght about Yogi Berra that had a solid run and national tour, and was also in a revival of Awake and Sing! (2006). He was in the ensemble cast of the experimental film Dogville, directed by Lars von Trier of Denmark and starring Nicole Kidman, as well as the television film Hysterical Blindness (he received an Emmy Award for his role). In 2005, he played Agostino Casaroli in the television miniseries Pope John Paul II. He completed filming his scenes in the film The Wait in early 2012, shortly before his death.

In addition to acting, Gazzara worked as an occasional television director; his credits include the Columbo episodes A Friend in Deed (1974) and Troubled Waters (1975). Gazzara was nominated three times for the Tony Award for Best Performance by a Leading Actor in a Play—in 1956 for A Hatful of Rain, in 1975 for the paired short plays Hughie and Duet, and in 1977 for a revival of Who's Afraid of Virginia Woolf?, opposite Colleen Dewhurst.

== Personal life ==
Gazzara was married three times, first to actress Louise Erickson (1951–1957). He married actress Janice Rule on November 25, 1961 in San Francisco. They had a daughter. They divorced in 1979. He married model Elke Krivat in 1982 and was married to her until his death. Gazzara adopted his wife's daughter from her prior relationship. After separating from his first wife, Gazzara was engaged to stage actress Elaine Stritch and later disclosed a love affair with actress Audrey Hepburn. He and Hepburn co-starred in two of her final films, Bloodline (1979) and They All Laughed (1981).

In 1968, during filming of the war movie The Bridge at Remagen, co-starring Gazzara and friend Robert Vaughn, the Soviet Union and its allies invaded Czechoslovakia. The cast and crew were detained for a time; filming was later completed in West Germany. During their departure from Czechoslovakia, Gazzara and Vaughn assisted with the escape of a Czech waitress whom they had befriended. They smuggled her to Austria in a car waved through a border crossing which had not yet been taken over by the Soviet army in its crackdown of the Prague Spring.

Gazzara was featured in a 1994 article in Cigar Aficionado, in which he admitted smoking four packs of cigarettes a day before taking up cigar smoking in the mid-1960s.

Beginning in the late 1970s, Gazzara held permanent residence status in Italy. He maintained a second home in Umbria, where he lived while working in Europe.

During the 1970s, Gazzara was a member of the executive committee of the pro-Israeli group Writers and Artists for Peace in the Middle East.

=== Death ===
Gazzara was diagnosed with throat cancer in 1999. He suffered a stroke in 2005. On February 3, 2012, he died of pancreatic cancer at Bellevue Hospital Center in Manhattan. He was cremated.

== Stage credits ==
Year	Title	Role	Venue(s)	Notes	Ref.
1953–54	End as a Man	Jocko de Paris	Vanderbilt Theatre, New York		
1953–54	End as a Man	Jocko de Paris	Lyceum Theatre, New York		
1955–56	Cat on a Hot Tin Roof	Brick	Morosco Theatre, New York		
1955–56	A Hatful of Rain	Johnny Pope	Lyceum Theatre, New York		
1955–56	A Hatful of Rain	Johnny Pope	Plymouth Theatre, New York		
1957	A Hatful of Rain	Johnny Pope	U.S. tour	Replacement	
1958	The Night Circus	Joy	John Golden Theatre, New York		
1963	Strange Interlude	Edmund Darrell	Hudson Theatre, New York		
1963	Strange Interlude	Edmund Darrell	Martin Beck Theatre, New York		
1964	Traveller Without Luggage	Gaston	ANTA Playhouse, New York		
1975	Hughie	"Erie" Smith	John Golden Theatre, New York		
1975	Duet	Leonard Pelican	John Golden Theatre, New York		
1976	Who's Afraid of Virginia Woolf?	George	Music Box Theatre, New York		
1992	Shimada	Eric Dawson	Broadhurst Theatre, New York		
2003	Nobody Don't Like Yogi	Yogi Berra	The Lamb's Theatre, New York		
2006	Awake and Sing!	Jacob Berger	Belasco Theatre, New York		
2010	Awake and Sing!	Jacob Berger	Skirball Cultural Center, Los Angeles		

== Filmography ==
=== Film ===
Year	Title	Role	Notes
1957	The Strange One	Jocko De Paris	
1959	Anatomy of a Murder	Lt. Frederick Manion	
1960	The Passionate Thief	Lello	
1961	The Young Doctors	Dr. David Coleman	
1962	Convicts 4	John Resko	
1962	The Captive City	Cpt. George Stubbs	
1965	A Rage to Live	Roger Bannon	
1969	If It's Tuesday, This Must Be Belgium	Card Player	
1969	The Bridge at Remagen	Sergeant Angelo	
1970	King: A Filmed Record... Montgomery to Memphis	Himself	Documentary
1970	Husbands	Harry	
1972	The Sicilian Connection	Giuseppe "Joe" Coppola	
1973	The Neptune Factor	Cmdr. Adrian Blake	
1975	Capone	Al Capone	
1976	The Killing of a Chinese Bookie	Cosmo Vittelli	
1976	High Velocity	Cliff Baumgartner	
1976	Voyage of the Damned	Morris Troper	
1977	Opening Night	Manny Victor	
1979	Saint Jack	Jack Flowers	
1979	Bloodline	Rhys Williams	
1981	Inchon	Maj. Frank Hallsworth	
1981	They All Laughed	John Russo	
1981	Tales of Ordinary Madness	Charles Serking	
1982	The Girl from Trieste	Dino Romani	
1984	A Proper Scandal	Giulio Canella / Mario Bruneri	
1985	Woman of Wonders	Alberto	
1985	My Dearest Son	Antonio Morelli	
1986	The Professor	Franco	
1987	Control	Mike Zella	
1988	Quicker Than the Eye	Ben Norrell	
1988	Don Bosco	John Bosco	
1989	Champagne amer	Paul Rivière	
1989	Road House	Brad Wesley	
1990	Beyond the Ocean	John Tana	Also co-writer and director
1991	Forever	Marcello Rondi	
1994	Sherwood's Travels	Raphael de Pietro	
1994	Swallows Never Die in Jerusalem	Moshe	
1995	Nefertiti, figlia del sole	Amenhotep III	
1995	The Dogfighters	Dick Althorp	
1995	Banditi	Amos	
1996	Scene of the Crime	Lt. Jack "Jigsaw" Lasky	
1997	Farmer & Chase	Farmer	
1997	Shadow Conspiracy	Vice President Saxon	
1997	Stag	Frank Grieco	
1997	The Spanish Prisoner	Klein	
1997	Vicious Circles	March	
1998	The Big Lebowski	Jackie Treehorn	
1998	Too Tired to Die	John Sage	
1998	Buffalo '66	Jimmy Brown	
1998	Happiness	Lenny Jordan	
1998	Illuminata	Old Flavio	
1999	Summer of Sam	Luigi	
1999	The Thomas Crown Affair	Andrew Wallace	
1999	Shark in a Bottle	The Arranger	
1999	Jack of Hearts	Bartossa	
1999	Paradise Cove	Duke Mantee	
2000	Blue Moon	Frank Cavallo	
2000	Poor Liza	The Narrator	
2000	Believe	Ellicott Winslowe	
2000	Home Sweet Hoboken	—N/a	
2000	Very Mean Men	Gino Minetti	
2000	Undertaker's Paradise	Jim	
2000	The List	D.A. Bernard Salman	
2000	Nella terra di nessuno	Scalzi	
2003	L'ospite segreto	Solomos	
2003	Dogville	Jack McKay	
2005	Bonjour Michel	Michele Terranova	
2005	Schubert	Don José	
2006	Paris, je t'aime	Ben	Segment: "Quartier Latin"
2006	The Shore	Bob Harris	
2008	Looking for Palladin	Jack Palladin	
2008	Eve	Joe	Short film
2009	Holy Money	Vatican's Banker	
2009	13	Schlondorff	
2010	Christopher Roth	Paul Andersen	
2011	Chez Gino	Giovanni	
2011	Ristabbànna	Natale	

=== Television ===
Year	Title	Role	Notes
1951–54	Danger	Various roles	4 episodes
1952–53	Treasury Men in Action	Various roles	2 episodes
1952–58	Kraft Television Theatre	Various roles	2 episodes
1954	Medallion Theatre	Dick	Episode: "The Alibi Kid"
1954	The United States Steel Hour	Richard Elgin Jr.	Episode: "The Notebook Warrior"
1954	Justice	Various roles	3 episodes
1957–58	Playhouse 90	Various roles	2 episodes
1959	Armchair Theatre	Jim Mason	Episode: "You'll Never See Me Again"
1959	DuPont Show of the Month	Carlos Perez	Episode: "Body and Soul"
1963–64	Arrest and Trial	Det. Sgt. Nick Anderson	Main role, 30 episodes
1965	Kraft Suspense Theatre	Paul Bryan	Episode: "Rapture at Two-Forty"
1965–68	Run for Your Life	Paul Bryan	Main role, 85 episodes Also director, 5 episodes
1967	Bob Hope Presents the Chrysler Theatre	Sidney	Episode: "Free of Charge"
1971	The Name of the Game	—N/a	Director; Episode: "Appointment in Palermo"
1974–75	Columbo	—N/a	Director, 2 episodes
1993	Cycle Simenon	John	Episode: "Les gens d'en face"
1996	Strangers	Doctor	Episode: "A New Life"
2001	Law & Order: Special Victims Unit	E.A.D.A.	Episode: "Wrath"
2009	L'onore e il rispetto	Fred	6 episodes

==== TV films and miniseries ====
Year	Title	Role
1961	Cry Vengeance!	Davidde
1964	A Carol for Another Christmas	Fred
1972	When Michael Calls	Doremus Connelly
1972	Fireball Forward	Maj. Gen. Joe Barrett
1972	The Family Rico	Eddie Rico
1972	Pursuit	Steven Graves
1973	You'll Never See Me Again	—N/a
1973	Maneater	Nick Baron
1974	QB VII	Abe Cady
1977	The Death of Richie	George Werner
1977	The Trial of Lee Harvey Oswald	Anson "Kip" Roberts
1982	A Question of Honor	Det. Joe DeFalco
1984	Hollywood's Most Sensational Mysteries	Narrator
1985	An Early Frost	Nick Pierson
1985	A Letter to Three Wives	Porter Holloway
1987	Police Story: The Freeway Killings	Capt. Tom Wright
1987	Downpayment on Murder	Harry Cardell
1990	People Like Us	Gus Bailey
1991	Lies Before Kisses	Grant Sanders
1993	Blindsided	Ira Gold
1993	Love, Honor & Obey: The Last Mafia Marriage	Joseph Bonanno
1994	Parallel Lives	Charlie Duke
1994	Fatal Vows: The Alexandra O'Hara Story	Papa
1995	Convict Cowboy	Warden
1996	Una donna in fuga	Don Peppe
1997	The Notorious 7	Dom Diablo
1998	Valentine's Day	Joe Buddha
1998	Angelo nero	Padre Guelfi
1998	Il tesoro di Damasco	Gregorio Kos
1999	Tre stelle	Col. Marshall
2000	Un bacio nel buio	—N/a
2000	Piovuto dal cielo	Cesare Palmieri
2001	Brian's Song	Coach Halas
2002	Hysterical Blindness	Nick
2005	Pope John Paul II	Agostino Casaroli
2006	And Quiet Flows the Don	Gen. Secretov
2007	Donne sbagliate	Franco Maresco
2008	Empire State Building Murders	Paulie Genovese
2013	Pupetta: Il coraggio e la passione	Otello Di Bella

== Books ==
- Gazzara, Ben (September 13, 2004). In the Moment: My Life as an Actor. New York: Carroll & Graf, Publishers. ISBN 978-0-7867-1399-8. OCLC 56556190.

== Awards and nominations ==
Institution	Year	Category	Work	Result
David di Donatello Awards	1985	Best Actor	A Proper Scandal	Nominated
Drama Desk Awards	1976	Outstanding Actor in a Play	Who's Afraid of Virginia Woolf?	Nominated
Drama Desk Awards	2004	Outstanding Solo Performance	Nobody Don't Like Yogi	Nominated
Drama Desk Awards	2006	Outstanding Ensemble Performance	Awake and Sing!	Won
Flaiano Prize	1993	Career Award	—N/a	Won
Golden Globe Awards	1966	Best TV Star – Male	Run for Your Life	Nominated
Golden Globe Awards	1967	Best TV Star – Male	Run for Your Life	Nominated
Golden Globe Awards	1968	Best TV Star – Male	Run for Your Life	Nominated
Golden Raspberry Awards	1983	Worst Supporting Actor	Inchon	Nominated
Golden Raspberry Awards	1989	Worst Supporting Actor	Road House	Nominated
Primetime Emmy Awards	1967	Outstanding Lead Actor in a Drama Series	Run for Your Life	Nominated
Primetime Emmy Awards	1968	Outstanding Lead Actor in a Drama Series	Run for Your Life	Nominated
Primetime Emmy Awards	1986	Outstanding Lead Actor in a Limited Series or Movie	An Early Frost	Nominated
Primetime Emmy Awards	2003	Outstanding Supporting Actor in a Limited Series or Movie	Hysterical Blindness	Won
Marco Island Film Festival	2000	Golden Eagle Award	—N/a	Won
National Board of Review	1998	Best Acting by an Ensemble	Happiness	Won
Oldenburg Film Festival	2001	German Independence Honorary Award	—N/a	Won
San Sebastián International Film Festival	2005	Donostia Lifetime Achievement Award	—N/a	Won
Theatre World Awards	1954	—N/a	End as a Man	Won
Tony Awards	1956	Best Actor in a Play	A Hatful of Rain	Nominated
Tony Awards	1975	Best Actor in a Play	Hughie / Duet	Nominated
Tony Awards	1977	Best Actor in a Play	Who's Afraid of Virginia Woolf?	Nominated
