= Maneater (1973 film) =

- Genre: Adventure; Drama; Horror; Thriller
- Written by: Marcus Demian; Vince Edwards; Jimmy Sangster
- Directed by: Vince Edwards
- Starring: Ben Gazzara; Sheree North; Richard Basehart
- Music by: George Romanis
- Country of origin: United States
- Original language: English

Production
- Producer: Robert F. O'Neill
- Production locations: Universal Studios - 100 Universal City Plaza, Universal City, California
- Cinematography: Haskell B. Boggs
- Editor: John F. Schreyer
- Running time: 74 minutes
- Production company: Universal Television

Original release
- Network: ABC
- Release: December 8, 1973

Maneater is a 1973 American adventure horror television film directed by Vince Edwards. It was based on an idea of Edwards and shot over 11 days. Jimmy Sangster helped write the script.

== Cast ==
- Ben Gazzara as Nick Baron
- Richard Basehart as Carl Brenner
- Sheree North as Gloria Baron
- Laurette Spang as Polly
- Kip Niven as Shep Saunders

== Plot ==
Two couples on a camping trip are hunted by two tigers set upon them by a crazed animal trainer.
