= Francesco Carnelutti =

Italian jurist and lawyer

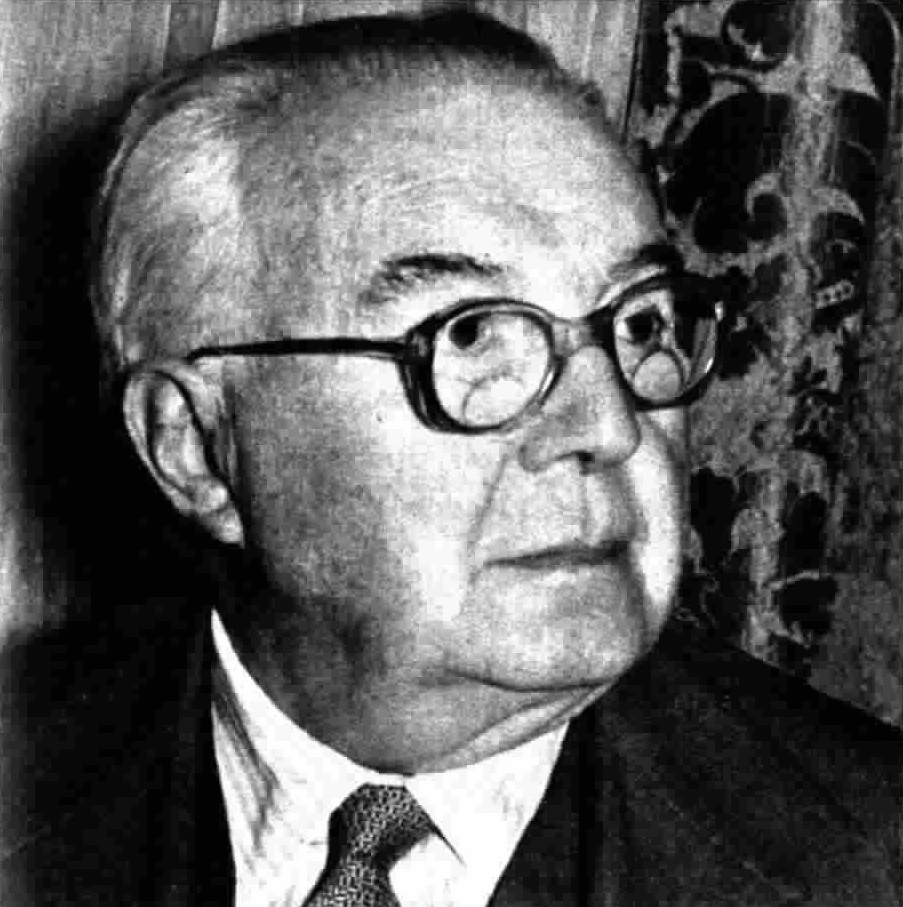
- Born: 15 May 1879; Udine, Italy
- Died: 8 March 1965 (aged 85); Milan, Italy
- Occupation: Jurist

Francesco Carnelutti (15 May 1879 – 8 March 1965) was an Italian jurist and lawyer.

Born in Udine, Carnelutti graduated in law at the University of Padua. Starting from 1910, he was professor of industrial law at the Bocconi University in Milan, professor of commercial law at the University of Catania, and professor of civil procedure in his alma mater, at the Bocconi University and at the Sapienza University of Rome.

Carnelutti's studies mainly focused on civil procedural law, but also had a lasting influence in the industrial and bankruptcy law. The journal he founded in 1924 together with scholar Giuseppe Chiovenda, Rivista di diritto processuale civile, together with other works by Chiovenda and Carnelutti, notably the seven volumes of Carnelutti's Lezioni di diritto processuale civile, influenced the Italian legislation, innovating various aspects of the procedural law, and also influenced the law's university teaching. Carnelutti himself collaborated to the drafting of the Italian Civil Procedure Code in 1940.

After the World War II, Carnelutti's works were increasingly characterized by a mystical vein and by references to Christian values and philosophy. During his career Carnelutti was also a prominent lawyer, protagonist of famous trials such as the Bruneri-Canella case and the trial against Rodolfo Graziani.

== Works ==
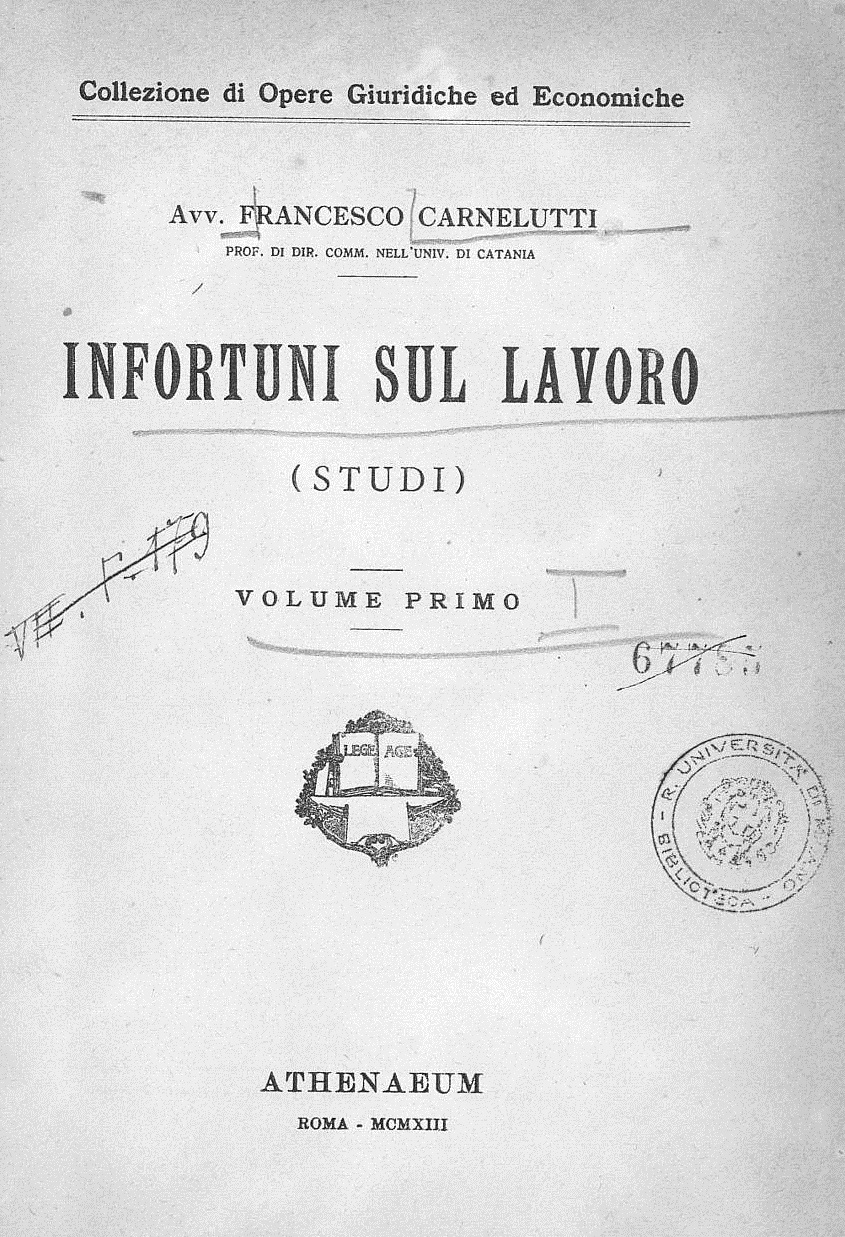
Infortuni sul lavoro, 1913

- Lezioni di diritto commerciale, 1910
- Infortuni sul lavoro, 1913–1914
  - Infortuni sul lavoro. Vol. 1. Roma: Athenaeum. 1913.
  - Infortuni sul lavoro. Vol. 2. Roma: Athenaeum. 1914.
- La prova civile, 1915
- Studi di diritto civile, 1916
- Studi di diritto industriale, 1916
- Poteri e doveri del giudice in tema di perizia, 1916
- Studi di diritto commerciale, 1917
- Studi di diritto processuale, 1925–28
- Del processo di cognizione, 1926
- Il danno e il reato, 1926
- Lezioni di diritto processuale civile, 1929
- Teoria generale del reato, 1933
- Teoria giuridica della circolazione, 1933
- Teoria del falso, 1935
- Teoria del regolamento collettivo dei rapporti di lavoro, 1936
- Sistema del diritto processuale civile, 1936–38
- Teoria cambiaria, 1937
- Metodologia del diritto, 1939
- Teoria generale del diritto, 1940
- Interpretazione del Padre nostro. Il poema di Gesù, 1941
- La strada, 1941
- Istituzioni del nuovo processo civile italiano, 1942
- Meditazioni, Tumminelli, 1942
- Mio Fratello Daniele, 1943
- La strada, 1943
- Il problema della pena, 1945
- La storia e la fiaba, 1945
- Dialoghi con Francesco, 1947
- Arte del diritto, 1949
- America, 1950
- L'editore, 1952
- Discorsi intorno al diritto, 1953
- Un uomo in prigione, 1953
- Come nasce il diritto, ERI, 1954
- Codice civile commentato (with Walter Bigiavi e Alberto Caltabiano), Cedam, 1955
- Il canto del grillo, 1956
- Le miserie del processo penale, 1957
- Diritto e processo, 1958
- Principi del processo penale, Morano, 1960
- La guerre et la paix, 1962
- Come nasce il Diritto, ERI, 1963
- Come si fa un processo, ERI, 1964
