= The Family Rico =

- Genre: Crime; Drama
- Based on: The Brothers Rico by Georges Simenon
- Written by: David Karp
- Directed by: Paul Wendkos
- Starring: Ben Gazzara; Jack Carter; Dane Clark
- Theme music composer: Dave Grusin
- Country of origin: United States
- Original language: English

Production
- Producer: George LeMaire
- Cinematography: Robert B. Hauser
- Editor: Carroll Sax
- Running time: 73 minutes
- Production company: CBS

Original release
- Network: CBS
- Release: September 12, 1972

The Family Rico is a 1972 American TV movie directed by Paul Wendkos based on a novel by Georges Simenon. A Mafia chief is torn between his brother, who has defected from the family, and his loyalty to the organization. It was a remake of The Brothers Rico.

== Cast ==
- Ben Gazzara
- Jack Carter
- Dane Clark
- Jo Van Fleet
- Leif Erickson
- Sal Mineo
- John Marley
- James Farentino
- John Randolph
- Sian Barbara Allen
- Michael Anderson Jr.
- Tom Pedi
- Alan Vint

== Reception ==
The New York Times called it "serviceable".
