= Dennis Patrick =

American actor (1918–2002)

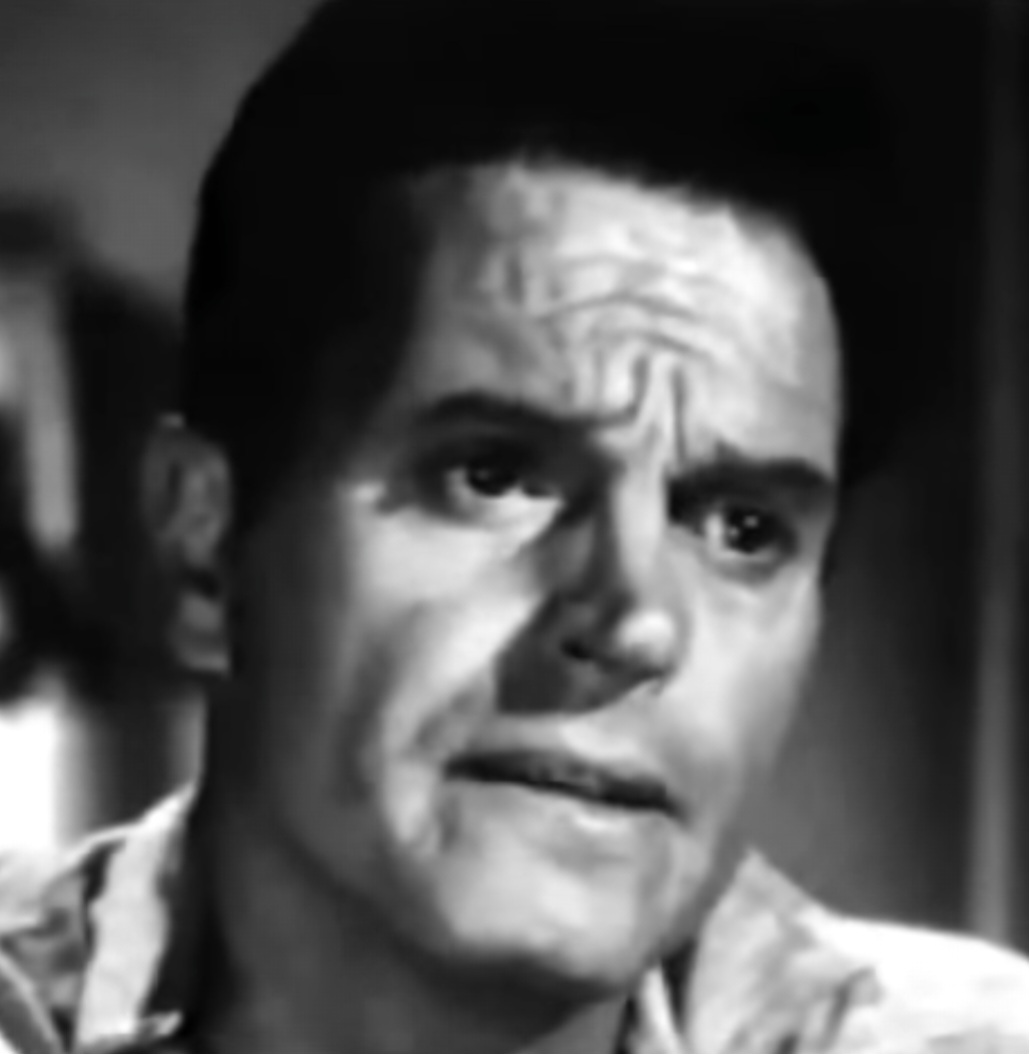
- Patrick in an episode of One Step Beyond (1960)
- Born: March 14, 1918; Philadelphia, Pennsylvania, U.S.
- Died: October 13, 2002 (aged 84); Hollywood, California, U.S.
- Other name: Dennis Harrison
- Occupation: Character actor
- Years active: 1949 – 1994
- Known for: See Career
- Spouse: Barbara Cason (m. 1970; died 1990)
- Children: 2

Dennis Patrick (born Dennis Patrick Harrison; March 14, 1918 – October 13, 2002) was an American character actor, primarily in television.

== Early life ==
Patrick was born in Philadelphia, Pennsylvania. Patrick served in the U.S. Navy during World War II, making naval training films.

== Career ==
Patrick is known for his work in television shows. He portrayed Patrick Chase in the syndicated drama Rituals (1984), Vaughn Leland in CBS's Dallas, Jack Breen in the ABC crime drama Bert D'Angelo/Superstar (1976), and Sergeant Pat O'Dennis in the syndicated comedy The Cliffwood Avenue Kids (1977).

He made four guest appearances on Perry Mason, three of them as the murder victim: Martin Selkirk in the 1959 episode, "The Case of the Deadly Toy"; Martin Somers in the 1962 episode, "The Case of the Tarnished Trademark"; and golf pro Chick Farley in the 1966 episode, "The Case of the Golfer's Gambit". He also appeared as Prosecutor Darryl Teshman in the 1960 episode "The Case of the Prudent Prosecutor".

Among his other television appearances were the roles of Jason McGuire and Paul Stoddard in Dark Shadows, Mac in Somerset, and in such films as The Time Travelers (1964), Daddy's Gone A-Hunting (1969), Joe (1970), Dear Dead Delilah, (1972) and Nightmare Honeymoon (1974). He also was a stage actor, having won the Theater World Award for his starring role in The Wayward Saint. He also portrayed Jean Paul Marat on Broadway in Marat/Sade.

Patrick appeared in more than 1,800 guest roles on television programs during his four-decade career, including stints on Tales of Tomorrow (1952), Kraft Television Theatre (1949–57), Gunsmoke (1958), Playhouse 90 (1958), Death Valley Days in "The Red Flannel Shirt", as Patrick O'Dell, a miner with an Irish brogue(1958), Sugarfoot (1959), Buckskin (1959), Peter Gunn (1959), U.S. Marshal (1959-1960), 77 Sunset Strip (1960), Bonanza (1960, as Sam Bord in the episode "The Hopefuls"), Wanted: Dead or Alive (1960), Alfred Hitchcock Presents (1960–61); Hawaiian Eye (1962), The Virginian (episode "Big Day, Great Day" 1962), Laramie (1960-1963), Perry Mason (1959-1966), Empire (as Hoot Hinkley in "The Tiger Inside", 1963), The Dakotas (1963), Lost in Space (1966, as Keema "The Golden Man"), The Big Valley (1969, as Ed Crawford in "The Battle of Mineral Springs"), Dark Shadows (1967-1970), Emergency! (three episodes, 1972-1975), and Dallas (1979-1984). Dennis Patrick also appeared in a Barnaby Jones episode titled "Dangerous Summer" (02/11/1975); in Quincy, M.E. (three episodes, 1979–82); and in The Incredible Hulk (as Buck Hendricks, a big game hunter looking to help news reporter Jack McGee capture "The Jolly Green Giant"). He also appeared as Walter Hart in The Rockford Files, season 2, episode 6: "The Great Blue Lake Land and Development Company".

Patrick played Sheriff George Patterson in the film House of Dark Shadows (1970).

== Personal life and death ==
Patrick married fellow Dark Shadows actor, Barbara Cason, in 1970. They had two children. Barbara died in 1990. On October 13, 2002, Patrick died next to his pet poodle as fire swept his four-story home in Hollywood Hills, California. He was 84. Patrick was suffering from cancer, needed kidney dialysis, and rarely left the house.

== Filmography ==
Year	Title	Role	Notes
1949	C-Man		Uncredited
1950	Guilty Bystander	Mace	
1950	The Strip Tease Murder Case	Johnny	
1958	Death Valley Days	Pat O'Dell	Season 7 Episode 5 "The Red Flannel Shirt"
1958	Gunsmoke	Trumbell	Season 4 Episode 9 "Land Deal"
1960	Alfred Hitchcock Presents	Mr. Rose	Season 5 Episode 20: "The Day of the Bullet"
1960	Wanted: Dead or Alive	Eli	Season 3 Episode 4 (The Looters)
1961	Alfred Hitchcock Presents	Harry Miller	Season 6 Episode 17: "The Last Escape"
1963	The Alfred Hitchcock Hour	Frenchy La Font	Season 2 Episode 3: "Terror at Northfield"
1964	The Time Travelers	Councilman Willard	
1965	Major Dundee		Uncredited
1969	Daddy's Gone A-Hunting	Dr. Parkington	
1970	Tiger by the Tail	Frank Michaelis	
1970	Joe	Bill Compton	
1970	House of Dark Shadows	Sheriff George Patterson	
1974	Nightmare Honeymoon	John Kenmore	
1974	Panic on the 5:22	Dudley Stevenson	ABC Movie of the Week
1975	The First 36 Hours of Dr. Durant	Mr. Wesco	ABC Movie of the Week
1976	The Bionic Woman	Carlton Harris	Episodes: “Welcome Home, Jaime, Part 1 and Part 2”
1978	The Eddie Capra Mysteries	Barry Norcross	Episode: "How Do I Kill Thee?"
1980	The Secret of Nikola Tesla	Thomas Alva Edison	
1981	Choices	Dr. Bowers	
1984	Murder, She Wrote	Dexter Baxendale	Episode: "The Murder of Sherlock Holmes"
1985	Heated Vengeance	Pope	
1989	Chances Are	Archibald Blair	
1994	The Air Up There	Father O'Hara	(final film role)
