= Robert Gentry (actor) =

American actor (1940–2022)

- Born: September 29, 1940
- Died: September 17, 2022 (aged 81)

Robert Gentry (September 29, 1940 – September 17, 2022) was an American actor known for his work on daytime soap operas.

== Career ==
Gentry was one of the actors to play Ed Bauer on Guiding Light. He portrayed Ed from 1966 to 1969, then left the role to appear on a new ABC soap opera, The Best of Everything.. Gentry returned nearly 30 years later to play the role of Ed on a recurring basis from 1997 to 1998.

Gentry played two characters on Another World. From 1979 to 1981, he played the character of the opportunistic Philip Lyons, then returned in 1997–98 to play the role of Detective Craig Morris. In 1983, he had the short-term role of Giles Morgan on One Life to Live.

His longest tenure was on All My Children, where he played Ross Chandler, the nephew of powerful Adam Chandler, and illegitimate son of Palmer Cortlandt, from 1983–1990. In 1990, on Generations, he played the role of villain Jordan Hale

Gentry played the part of Richard Hunt on Days of Our Lives from 1994 to 1995, as well as shorter roles on other serials, including The Bold & The Beautiful where he played Elliot, the Forrester family attorney.

Gentry appeared as a guest on a number of primetime series. In the early-1970s he co-starred with Agnes Moorehead in the film Dear Dead Delilah. In 1988, Gentry was nominated for an Emmy Award for Outstanding Lead Actor in a Drama Series for his All My Children role.

== Personal life ==
Gentry was born in New York City on September 29, 1940. He died on September 17, 2022, at the age of 81.

== Filmography ==
=== Film ===
Year	Title	Role	Notes
1966	The Plastic Dome of Norma Jean	Vance	
1972	Dear Dead Delilah	Richard	

=== Television ===
Year	Title	Role	Notes
1965	The Doctors	Brad Murphy	7 episodes
1966–1997	Guiding Light	Dr. Ed Bauer	6 episodes
1967	N.Y.P.D.	Artie	Episode: "The Pink Gumdrop"
1970	Medical Center	Peter Marshall	Episode: "Moment of Decision"
1972	The Streets of San Francisco	Rex Riley	Episode: "The Takers"
1973	ABC's Wide World of Entertainment	Henry Clerval	2 episodes
1973	The F.B.I.	Leo Miles	Episode: "The Bought Jury"
1975	Gunsmoke	Tucker	Episode: "Larkin"
1975	Cannon	Bill Braden	Episode: "Perfect Fit for a Frame"
1976	Police Story	Lunther	Episode: "Monster Manor"
1977	Charlie's Angels	Gene Knox	Episode: "Angel Fight"
1978	Standing Tall	Tom Sparkman	Television film
1978	Fantasy Island	Dick Stanton	Episode: "Charlie's Cherubs/Stalag 3"
1980–1998	Another World	Philip Lyons	28 episodes
1983	One Life to Live	Giles Morgan	2 episodes
1983–2007	All My Children	Ross Chandler	33 episodes
1990	Jake and the Fatman	Capt. Carrier	Episode: "I'll Dance at Your Wedding"
1990	Hunter	Ben Linder	Episode: "Unacceptable Loss"
1990	Matlock	Jim Steinbach	2 episodes
1990–1991	Generations	Jordan Hale #2	74 episodes
1992	Perry Mason: The Case of the Fatal Framing	Winston Hope	Television film
1993–1994	The Bold and the Beautiful	Elliott Parker	9 episodes
1994–1995	Days of Our Lives	Dr. Roger Hunt	10 episodes
1996	New York Undercover	Neil J. Davis	Episode: "A Time of Faith: Part 1"
2001	Law & Order	Barry Pratt	Episode: "Whose Monkey Is It Anyway?"
