= The Fury (Farris novel) =

1976 novel by John Farris

First edition (publ. Playboy Press)

The Fury is a thriller/horror novel by American writer John Farris. The novel was published in 1976 and became a 1978 feature film starring Kirk Douglas and Amy Irving.

== Plot summary ==
In 1972, a young man named Robin Sandza lives with his strictly religious aunt and uncle due to his father Peter's frequent trips on business. As he grows, Robin develops powerful psychic abilities. Unknown to Robin, his father's "business trips" are cover for his true occupation as a government assassin. One of Peter's superiors in the intelligence community, the cruel and ambitious Ben Childermass, learns of Robin's abilities. Childermass fakes Robin's death for Peter, while also convincing Robin of Peter's death, all as part of a conspiracy to isolate Robin and turn him into a deadly weapon under Childermass' control.

Robin also shares a psychic bond with Gillian Bellaver, the daughter of immensely rich and influential parents, owing to the two of them being psychic "twins". Though Robin remembers past lives where they were together, Gillian does not. As a result, Robin's powers have surpassed Gillian's. Though their bond is different than it had been in other lives, they can still "visit" each other psychically, and have done so since Gillian was much younger.

In 1976, Gillian's own psychic powers begin to emerge after an intense clairvoyant episode leads to a hospital stay. She grows in strength quickly, but has no control. Her powers cause her to pass out, while the energy she generates when using them cause fatal hemorrhaging in anyone unlucky enough to be nearby.

By now, Peter has realized Robin's death was faked and is using his vicious and violent skills to hunt down Childermass and reclaim his son. In the process, he learns of Gillian as Childermass is also made aware of the young woman's potential. Childermass' agents nearly kill Peter as he attempts to find Robin.

Meanwhile, Robin has been growing terribly powerful but increasingly unstable and paranoid during the years he has been under the manipulations of Childermass’ organization. Gillian has become aware of this dark turn as her "visits" with Robin have become abusive. After a demonstration of Robin's powers, other government agencies recognize the threat represented by Robin and by Childermass' lust for power. When Peter contacts a friend for help in reaching his son, he is programmed by Childermass' enemies to kill Robin.

Gillian's parents unwittingly surrender her to Childermass. She is rescued by Peter's girlfriend Hester, who works for Childermass' organization. Hester is killed but Peter takes Gillian to safety. Gillian reveals her bond with Robin, and that she can use it to find him. The pair are captured by Childermass and brought to the facility where Robin is held. Robin has a psychotic break, brutally murdering the doctor who had been sexually manipulating and grooming him for Childermass. Peter and Robin briefly escape and are reunited on the roof of the facility. In a moment of clarity, Robin calls to Peter, triggering his father’s programming. Peter drops Robin from the roof to his death and is subsequently shot and killed by an enraged Childermass.

Childermass intends to simply start over with Gillian, but she has witnessed enough to realize his depravity. Gillian ambushes him in the bath, where she forces him under the water and uses her powers to kill him. In the aftermath, Gillian resolves to gain control over her abilities as she waits for her parents and the authorities to find her and take her home.

== Film ==
A film adaptation of the novel was released in 1978. Farris wrote the screenplay, Brian De Palma directed and Kirk Douglas and Amy Irving starred. Carrie, a 1974 novel by Stephen King with a similar premise and its 1976 film adaptation was also directed by De Palma and starred Irving.

In April 2008 a remake of the film was announced by Fox 2000, to be written by Brian McGreevy and Lee Shipman. Farris said that he would not be involved in the project. Since then, there has been no further news on the project.

== Sequels ==
Farris has written three sequels to the novel:

- The Fury and the Terror (2001)
- The Fury and the Power (2003)
- Avenging Fury (2008)
