= Anne Meacham =

American actress (1925–2006)

- Meacham in 1960
- Born: July 21, 1925; Chicago, Illinois, U.S.
- Died: January 12, 2006 (aged 80); Canaan, New York, U.S.
- Occupation: Actress
- Years active: 1952–1982

Anne Meacham (July 21, 1925 — January 12, 2006) was an American actress of stage, film and television.

== Biography ==
Born and raised in Chicago, Meacham left to study drama at Yale University and the Neighborhood Playhouse, New York. She debuted on Broadway as Ensign Jane Hilton in the 1952 The Long Watch, for which she received a Clarence Derwent Award, a prize for newcomers to the New York stage.

She appeared in many on- and off-Broadway productions, often adaptations of plays written by Tennessee Williams, such as Suddenly Last Summer, The Gnädiges Fräulein and In the Bar of a Tokyo Hotel. For her interpretation of the role of Catherine Holly in Suddenly Last Summer (played by Elizabeth Taylor in the film version), she received an Obie Award as Best Actress.

Other Broadway appearances included Jean Giraudoux's Ondine, Eugenia, an adaptation of Henry James's The Europeans, The Crucible and The Seagull. She received a second Obie award for her performance in Hedda Gabler in 1961. Her last Broadway appearance was as Gertrude in Tom Stoppard's Rosencrantz and Guildenstern Are Dead in 1968.

Meacham made many TV appearances since the 1950s and made her film debut in Robert Rossen's 1964 Lilith. She was a long-lasting cast member of the TV series Another World.

She died from undisclosed causes in Canaan, New York, on January 12, 2006, aged 80. Her death was reported by her friend, actress Marian Seldes.

== Filmography (selected) ==
- 1964: Lilith as Yvonne Meaghan
- 1972: Dear Dead Delilah as Grace Charles
- 1972–1982: Another World (TV series) as Louise Goddard
- 1974: The Gardener as Mrs. García
- 1974: Seizure as Eunice Kahn
