= John Farris =

American novelist (born 1936)

- Born: John Lee Farris; July 26, 1936 (age 90); Jefferson City, Missouri, U.S.
- Education: Rhodes College
- Occupation: Author
- Spouse(s): Kathleen; Mary Ann Pasante
- Children: 4
- Writing career
- Genres: Suspense, horror
- Notable work: The Fury

John Lee Farris (born July 26, 1936) is an American novelist, screenwriter, and playwright. He first achieved best-seller status at age twenty-three and is most famous as the author of The Fury (Playboy Press, 1976). He is also known largely for his work in the southern Gothic genre.

== Life ==
Farris was born in Jefferson City, Missouri to John Linder Farris (1909–1982) and Eleanor Carter Farris (1905–1984). Raised in Tennessee, he graduated from Central High School and attended Southwestern College (now Rhodes College), both in Memphis. His first wife, Kathleen, (deceased) was the mother of Julie Marie, John and Jeff Farris; his second wife, Mary Ann Pasante, is the mother of Peter John (P.J.) Farris.

Beginning with his first publication at age 19, The Corpse Next Door, Farris published twelve novels from the mid-1950s through the 1960s. These included a series of hardboiled crime novels under the pseudonym Steve Brackeen. Farris's early "Harrison High" novels were a major influence on Stephen King. Farris assisted in the rejuvenation of the horror novel with When Michael Calls, published in 1967.

After a hiatus of several years, he returned to the horror field to write his best-known novel, The Fury (1976), which was filmed the following year by Brian de Palma. Farris's horror novel, All Heads Turn When the Hunt Goes By, saw print in 1978. He then demonstrated a remarkable diversity with a suspense novel, Shatter (1981); the occult adventure Catacombs (1982); a subdued ghost story, The Uninvited (1982); and a flamboyant novel of possession, Son of the Endless Night (1985). At the 1995 World Horror Convention, he was named Writer Guest of Honor, along with Neil Gaiman and R.L. Stine. In 2001 he was presented the Bram Stoker Award for Lifetime Achievement. At the 2015 World Horror Convention he was an Author Guest of Honor.

Apart from his substantial body of fiction, his work includes motion picture screenplays of his own books (i.e., The Fury), original scripts and adaptations of the works of others (such as Alfred Bester's The Demolished Man). He also wrote and directed the film Dear Dead Delilah in 1973. He has had several plays produced off-Broadway, and also paints and writes poetry. At various times he has made his home in New York, southern California, Puerto Rico, and most recently near Atlanta, Georgia.

== Film adaptations ==
Three of his works have been made into film: first Harrison High became Because They're Young (1960), followed by When Michael Calls (1972), and then The Fury (1978) which was directed by Brian De Palma.

== TV adaptations ==
Farris's short story "I Scream. You Scream. We All Scream for Ice Cream." was adapted for the Showtime anthology series Masters of Horror in 2007.

== Bibliography ==
=== Novels (and other fiction) ===
- The Corpse Next Door (Graphic Books, 1956)
- The Body on the Beach (Bouregy & Curl, 1957, hc) (as Steve Brackeen)
- Baby Moll (Crest, 1958, pb) (as Steve Brackeen)
- Danger in My Blood (Crest, 1958, pb) (as Steve Brackeen)
- Harrison High (Rinehart & Co., 1959)
- Delfina (Gold Medal, 1962, pb) (as Steve Brackeen)
- The Long Light of Dawn (Putnam, 1962)
- The Guardians (Holt, Rinehart & Winston, 1964, hc) (as Steve Brackeen)
- King Windom (Trident, 1967)
- When Michael Calls (Trident, 1967)
- The Girl from Harrison High (Pocket Books, 1968, pb)
- The Captors (Trident, 1969)
- A Sudden Stillness (1970)
- The Trouble at Harrison High (Pocket Books, 1970, pb)
- Shadow on Harrison High (Pocket Books, 1972, pb)
- Happy Anniversary, Harrison High (Pocket Books, 1973, pb)
- Crisis at Harrison High (Pocket Books, 1974, pb)
- Sharp Practice (Simon & Schuster, 1974)
- The Fury (Playboy Press, 1976)
- Bad Blood (1977)
- All Heads Turn When the Hunt Goes By (Playboy Press, 1977; published in the UK as Bad Blood)
- Shatter (W. H. Allen [UK] 1980) (true first)
- Catacombs (Delacorte, 1981)
- The Uninvited (Delacorte, 1982)
- Son of the Endless Night (1984)
- Minotaur (Tor, 1985, pb)
- Wildwood (Tor, 1986, pb)
- Nightfall (Tor, 1987, pb)
- Scare Tactics (1988), nominated for Bram Stoker Award for Best Fiction Collection
- The Axeman Cometh (Tor, 1989, pb)
- Fiends (Dark Harvest, 1990 [limited edition])
- Demonios (1991)
- Sacrifice (Tor, 1994)
- Dragonfly (Tor/Forge, 1995)
- Soon She Will Be Gone (Tor/Forge, 1997)
- Solar Eclipse (Forge, 1999)
- The Fury and the Terror (2001)
- The Fury and the Power (2003)
- Phantom Nights' (2004)
- Elvisland (Babbage Press, 2004) (short stories)
- Avenging Fury (2008)
- You Don't Scare Me (2007)
- High Bloods (2009)

=== Short stories ===
- “Hunting Meth Zombies in the Great Nebraskan Wasteland ” in Elvisland, nominated for Bram Stoker Award for Short Fiction
- I Scream. You Scream. We All Scream for Ice Cream.
- Story Time with the Bluefield Strangler
- Transgressions: Volume Two

=== Screenplays ===
- Dear Dead Delilah (1972)
- The Fury (1978)
