= Cry Vengeance! =

1961 U.S. drama TV film

- Written by: Robert J. Crean
- Directed by: Franklin J. Schaffner
- Composer: David Amram
- Country of origin: United States
- Original language: English

Production
- Production company: NBC

Original release
- Network: NBC
- Release: April 18, 1961

Cry Vengeance! is a 1961 American TV movie directed by Franklin Schaffner.

== Plot ==
Davidde is the head of a gang of bandits in Sicily who regards himself as a modern-day Robin Hood. He is betrayed by gang member Andrea.

== Cast ==
- Ben Gazzara as Davidde
- Peter Falk as a priest
- Sal Mineo as Andrea

== Production ==
The show was a one-hour drama by Robert Crean produced by Robert Alan Aurthur. The show was meant to air in February 1961 but was postponed until April 18, 1961.

Sal Mineo said is part was "a role an actor can really get into. Good dramatic impact, good writing, good character development."

== Reception ==
The New York Times said there were "flashes of meaningful dialogue" but that the show was "disjointed and obscure, handicapped by acting that was too intense and production that was artificial and cumbersome."
