= Dear Dead Delilah =

- Theatrical poster
- Directed by: John Farris
- Screenplay by: John Farris
- Produced by: Jack Clement
- Starring: Agnes Moorehead; Michael Ansara; Will Geer; Dennis Patrick; Robert Gentry
- Cinematography: William R. Johnson
- Edited by: Ron Dorfman
- Music by: Bill Justis
- Production companies: Jack Music, Inc.
- Release date: May 5, 1972 (Nashville, Tennessee)
- Country: United States
- Language: English

Dear Dead Delilah is a 1972 American Southern Gothic film written and directed by John Farris and starring Agnes Moorehead, Will Geer, Michael Ansara, Dennis Patrick, Anne Meacham, and Robert Gentry. It follows a group of family members in a dilapidated Nashville plantation who fall victim to axe murders while searching for a family fortune hidden somewhere on the property.

It was filmed on location in Nashville, Tennessee. Star Agnes Moorehead was in ill health from advanced uterine cancer during production, so her character was written to be in a wheelchair as part of the story. Moorehead died less than 2 years after the film was released.

== Plot ==
In 1943 in Nashville, Tennessee, a pregnant woman, Luddy, murders her overbearing mother with an axe. Twenty-five years later, Luddy is released from prison. She visits a small college town nearby, where she observes a touch football game occurring in a local park. Luddy is inadvertently knocked over by one of the players, Richard. Richard's wife Ellen, a nurse, insists on letting a stunned Luddy stay with them at South Hall, a decrepit plantation where they reside with Ellen's infirm elderly aunt, Delilah.

Ellen discovers Luddy's prison paperwork while she is resting, and later confronts Luddy about it, but assures her she will not tell anyone. Ellen asks Luddy to stay at the home indefinitely, serving as a housekeeper. Ellen summons Delilah's brother Alonzo, a retired doctor, to examine Luddy. In conversation, Luddy tells Alonzo that she has a daughter that would be approximately Ellen's age. Meanwhile, Delilah meets with Roy Jurroe, her attorney, who warns her against enforcing a financial plan with her brothers Alonzo and Morgan, and sister, Grace. In a heated argument, Delilah threatens Ray and asks him to leave.

Several days later, Richard visits with his mistress, the alcoholic Grace, remarking his frustration over Delilah's control of the family fortune. Delilah has a dinner gathering at South Hall, attended by Ellen, Richard, Luddy, and Grace as well as Delilah's friend Morgan and his girlfriend Buffy. Alonzo, who is secretly battling a heroin addiction, also joins the gathering. During dinner, Delilah announces that she has mere months left to live, and that she has willed South Hall to the state of Tennessee. She also reveals that she located a packet of old money buried on the property amounting to $600,000; it had been left there by her father, Bailey Charles, who acquired it after covertly selling his expensive racehorses, setting his barn on fire, and collecting the insurance claim. Delilah declares that whoever finds the fortune can keep it. Alonzo and Grace are skeptical of Delilah's story.

Later that night, Luddy awakens to find an axe in her bed, and hears a woman beckoning her outside. She wanders to the horse stables, where she finds a dying Roy with axe wounds to his body. Alonzo stumbles upon the scene, and Luddy insists she did not hurt Roy. Alonzo agrees to help conceal Roy's corpse, and implores her to help him find the money. The two hide Roy's body in a smokehouse on the property. The next morning, Morgan meets with Delilah and asks for $40,000 to repay embezzlement debts to avoid prison time. Delilah refuses. Morgan subsequently learns from Buffy and a servant, Marshall, that a new septic tank was recently installed on the property.

At nightfall, Morgan begins digging around the septic tank, convinced the money is buried there. Buffy, meanwhile, gets drunk on gin. After finding no trace of the money, a frustrated Morgan storms into the woods, leaving Buffy alone. As she attempts to follow him, an assailant hacks her to death with an axe. When Morgan returns, he finds Buffy's body before being attacked and killed as well. Luddy discovers both bodies, and spends the rest of the night burying the couple. The following day, while helping Delilah dress, Ellen is insulted when Delilah implores her to leave Richard, criticizing their open marriage. Delilah takes her motorized wheelchair to a nearby mausoleum on the grounds to visit her father's grave. Inside, she observes a figure that she believes is her dead father. She attempts to enter the crypt, and screams.

Later that night, a drunken Grace finds the house is empty, and notices Delilah's empty wheelchair outside. She begins to playfully spin herself in the chair, only to be decapitated by a masked axe-wielding figure, who reveals himself to be Richard. Richard has returned bearing the hidden money, which he discovered in Bailey's tomb. Meanwhile, Ellen, who is in cahoots with Richard, injects Alonzo with a large quantity of heroin to produce a lethal overdose. The couple celebrate by having sex, but Richard subsequently turns on Ellen, slaughtering her as well. Meanwhile, an overdosing Alonzo screams for help, awakening Luddy. While wandering the grounds, Luddy is confronted by Richard, who admits to murdering the entire family — he plans to frame Luddy for his crimes. Richard attempts to drown Luddy in the swimming pool until Delilah, still alive, crawls from the mausoleum and shoots Richard in the head with his shotgun. Moments later, Delilah herself also dies.

Several days later, Alonzo and Luddy celebrate their receiving the money which will allow them to open a home for unwanted children, something they both had dreamed of doing.

== Cast ==
- Agnes Moorehead as Delilah Charles
- Will Geer as Roy Jurroe
- Michael Ansara as Morgan Charles
- Dennis Patrick as Doctor Alonzo Charles
- Anne Meacham as Grace Charles
- Robert Gentry as Richard
- Patricia Carmichael as Luddy Dublin
  - Anne Gibbs as Young Luddy
- Elizabeth Eis as Ellen
- Ruth Baker as Buffy
- John Marriott as Marshall

== Production ==
The film was shot on location in Nashville, Tennessee in the fall of 1970.

== Release ==
Dear Dead Delilah premiered in Nashville, Tennessee on May 5, 1972. The Motion Picture Association of America (MPAA) originally gave the film an X rating due to its graphic violence, though this rating was reduced to an R-rating following an appeal.

=== Home media ===
Vinegar Syndrome released Dear Dead Delilah on Blu-ray and DVD in 2018.

== Critical reception ==
TV Guide dismissed it as "Really, really lame"; and Fantastic Movie Musings and Ramblings noted, "this one is for axe murder completists only."

== See also ==
- List of American films of 1972
