= Because They're Young =

1960 film

- Theatrical release poster
- Directed by: Paul Wendkos
- Written by: James Gunn
- Based on: Harrison High by John Farris
- Produced by: Jerry Bresler
- Starring: Dick Clark
- Cinematography: Wilfred M. Cline
- Edited by: Chester W. Schaeffer
- Music by: John Williams
- Production company: Jerry Bresler Productions
- Distributed by: Columbia Pictures
- Release date: April 1960
- Running time: 102 minutes
- Country: United States
- Language: English

Because They're Young is a 1960 American drama film directed by Paul Wendkos and starring Dick Clark as Neil Hendry, an American high-school teacher who tries to make a difference in the lives of his students. The film co-stars Tuesday Weld, Michael Callan, Warren Berlinger, Roberta Shore, Doug McClure, Victoria Shaw, and Stephen Talbot. The screenplay was based on Harrison High, a 1959 novel by John Farris.

Musicians Duane Eddy and James Darren appear in cameo roles, and the film's title song became the biggest hit record of Eddy's career. Bobby Rydell's "Swingin' School" is featured prominently in the film's soundtrack, though Rydell does not appear in the film.

== Plot ==
When novice history teacher Neil Hendry arrives at Harrison High to undertake his first teaching assignment, he is escorted to his classroom by Joan Dietrich, the secretary to Harrison's principal, Mr. Donlan. Among Neil's students are Buddy McCalla, whose mother Frances hides her promiscuity from her son; Anne Gregor, whose sexual misstep the previous summer with incipient juvenile delinquent Griff Rimer has sullied her reputation; Ricky Summers, whose love for fellow student Jim prompts both sets of parents to warn their offspring about premarital sex; and Griff, whose leering glances at Anne disrupt Neil's class. After the first day of school, Donlan cautions Neil about becoming involved in the students' personal problems and states that all disciplinary issues will be dealt with by the principal.

Neil offers to drive Joan home, and when they stop at the market to buy groceries, she is surprised to discover that Neil's nine-year-old nephew Eric is living with him. Griff, who works at the market, is warned by Chris, the butcher, to stop stealing cigarettes because he is capable of "bigger things."

After dropping Joan off, Neil drives home, where his landlady, Mrs. Wellenberg, is taking care of Eric. When Eric proudly shows Neil, a former college football star whose career was ended by a car accident, a scrapbook of Neil's football victories assembled by Eric's late parents, Neil gruffly slams the book shut, sending Eric running to his room in tears. Neil then tells Mrs. Wellenberg that Eric's parents died in an automobile accident on the day they drove to Neil's school to watch him play, and that Eric has been living with Neil's aunt and uncle until he could finish practice teaching and set up a home for the boy. Remorseful, Neil apologizes to Eric, who tearfully hugs him.

Even though Neil has developed an aversion to football, he takes Eric to a game and asks Joan to accompany them. Afterward, Neil tells Joan about the accident, adding that he holds himself responsible because he was driving. Ever since, Neil explains, he has tried to pattern himself after his brother, an exemplary principal who was devoted to his students. However, Neil was censured as a student teacher for his involvement with his students, and consequently, the court would only give him temporary custody of Eric.

One day, Neil keeps football player Buddy after school to tutor him in history and is surprised when Buddy asks him for advice about his football plays. Neil is at first reticent, but when Buddy explains that he needs an athletic scholarship to attend college because his father walked out on the family and his mother is unable to earn enough money for tuition, Neil relents and offers to coach him.

Neil convinces the honor society committee to invite the entire student body to their annual dance, and on the night of the event, young toughs from Conway High wait outside to harass the Harrison students. When an overly amorous Jim makes sexual advances to Ricky, she recalls her parents' admonition and pushes him away. Buddy, who has been fixed up with Anne, shyly confides his difficulties with English class, prompting Anne to offer to help him. When Patcher, the leader of the Conway toughs, arrives and tries to crash the dance, Griff, a former Conway student, confronts him, and Patcher retreats. Afterward, the Harrison students view Griff with respect. After the dance, Joan criticizes Neil for disregarding Donlan's rules and giving too much of himself to his students, then confides that she was in love with an idealistic teacher like Neil who was killed by one of his students.

On the day that report cards are distributed, Griff is rewarded for his hard work with a slate of good grades. That night, he stops by Anne's house. Anne, who has been avoiding Griff, is reluctant to invite him in until he says he has been trying to change for her. Dropping her guard, Anne invites him inside. When he forces himself on her, she at first responds, but then asks him to leave. Embittered, Griff seeks out Chris and is surprised to find Patcher at Chris's apartment collecting a bundle of money from a robbery. Griff then asks to be included on the next job.

Later, Jim invites Griff to join him and Buddy for a weekend at his family's house on the lake. The date coincides with the night of Chris's planned robbery, and when Griff tries to back out, Chris insists that he follow through. On the evening of the robbery, Griff waits in the getaway truck while Chris knocks out the watchman and Patcher disables the alarm. Patcher botches the job, however, and sets off the alarm, and when the guard regains consciousness, he shoots and wounds Chris. Panicked, Griff drives off and ditches the truck, then takes refuge at Harrison High to escape the police.

Meanwhile, Jim's car breaks down on the way to the lake, forcing the boys to return home. As Buddy climbs the steps to his apartment, he hears his mother's drunken voice as she flirts with a man she picked up at a bar. Buddy, who idolizes his mother, is traumatized by her promiscuity and runs away, dropping his sweater in the hallway.

The next day, Mrs. McCalla, having discovered Buddy's discarded sweater, goes to Neil for help in finding her son. Anne, who has gone to school to rehearse for the class play, is surprised when she is approached by Buddy, who incoherently laments that his mother "is dirty." Griff then appears and charges that Anne is dirty, too. Enraged, Buddy attacks Griff and the boys fight. Neil, who has traced Buddy to the rehearsal, arrives just as Buddy pummels Griff and runs off. Afterward, Donlan summons Neil to his office, where Griff's father threatens to press charges against the school for his son's beating. To appease Rimer, Donlan suspends Neil and promises to expel Buddy.

Ricky, meanwhile, has found Anne's bloodied book on the school floor and shows it to Joan. Surmising that Anne saw the fight, Joan urges her to speak up for Buddy. Anne then breaks down, saying that the incident will further sully her reputation and ruin any chance she may have for a scholarship. Buddy, now desperate, finally goes to see Neil, and after his mother breaks down and apologizes, they reconcile. Joan then brings Anne to Neil's, and she agrees to tell Donlan the truth.

Jim, who has heard of Anne's predicament, realizes that premarital sex could have ruined his and Ricky's life and apologizes to Ricky for pressuring her. When Neil and Anne arrive at Donlan's office, they learn that Griff has already told Donlan the truth, sparing Anne her confession.

In the hallway, Patcher, who has followed Griff to the school, confronts him with a drawn switchblade. Griff runs up the stairs, and when Patcher starts to follow, Neil tries to stop him but is knocked unconscious. As the two boys fight in the biology lab, Neil revives and sounds the fire alarm, then tells Donlan to call the police. Neil finds Griff just after Patcher has stabbed him, and as Neil comforts the wounded Griff, Patcher flees into the hallway, where he is apprehended by the police. Because Neil and Donlan agree to testify on Griff's behalf, he is spared a jail sentence and placed on probation instead.

== Cast ==
- Dick Clark – Neil Hendry
- Michael Callan – Griff Rimer
- Tuesday Weld – Ann Gregor
- Victoria Shaw – Joan Dietrich
- Roberta Shore – Ricky Summers
- Warren Berlinger – Buddy McCalla
- Doug McClure – Jim
- Linda Watkins – Frances McCalla
- Chris Robinson – Patcher
- Rudy Bond – Chris
- Wendell Holmes – Principal Donlan
- Philip Coolidge – Mr. Rimer
- Bart Patton – Kramer
- Stephen Talbot – Eric
- James Darren – Himself
- Shirley Mitchell – Mrs. Summers
- Duane Eddy and the Rebels – Themselves

== Production ==
=== Original novel ===
The novel Harrison High was published in 1959 when its author John Farris was 22. He wrote it at the age of 20 while a student at the University of Missouri, and it was based on his high-school experiences in Memphis, though Harrison High is fictional.

The New York Times likened the book to "an interminable adolescent bull session."

=== Development ===
Film rights were bought by the Drexel Film Corporation in April 1959, and Drexel arranged to make the film through Columbia. Dick Clark, host of American Bandstand, signed to play the lead.

Jerry Bresler, who had a multi-picture deal with Columbia, was assigned to produce and he hired James Gunn to write a script. Paul Wendkos signed to direct in June.

"Most pictures about teenagers are wrong," said Clark, "They are older people's concepts of how teenagers act... I doubt if there ever can be a truly honest portrayal in films. Not all girls are beautiful and all boys handsome, as they are in films... [But] the script is fairly true to life. Most teenagers are normal."

The cast included several young actors under contract to Columbia, including Michael Callan. Warren Berlinger, who played Buddy McCalla, had just recently appeared in Blue Denim.

=== Shooting ===
Filming started on August 12, 1959. The campus and classroom scenes were shot at Hoover High School in Glendale, California. The football game sequences were shot at Burbank High School in Burbank, California.

Clark later wrote in his memoirs that making the film was "an extraordinary experience. Columbia really laid it on; they rented a house in Bel-Air owned by Mercedes McCambridge, provided a maid, a butler and a chauffeur, and gave me a hundred dollars a day in expenses."

== Reception ==
The Los Angeles Times called the film "an agreeable surprise."

The film did not make Variety's list of top earners for 1960.
