= The Fury (1978 film) =

1978 film by Brian De Palma

- Theatrical release poster
- Directed by: Brian De Palma
- Screenplay by: John Farris
- Based on: The Fury (1976 novel) by John Farris
- Produced by: Frank Yablans
- Starring: Kirk Douglas; John Cassavetes; Amy Irving; Carrie Snodgress; Charles Durning; Andrew Stevens
- Cinematography: Richard H. Kline
- Edited by: Paul Hirsch
- Music by: John Williams
- Production company: Frank Yablans Presentations
- Distributed by: 20th Century Fox
- Release date: March 10, 1978
- Running time: 118 minutes
- Country: United States
- Language: English
- Budget: $7.5 million
- Box office: $24 million (North America)

The Fury is a 1978 American supernatural horror thriller film directed by Brian De Palma, adapted by John Farris from his 1976 novel. It stars Kirk Douglas, John Cassavetes, Amy Irving, Carrie Snodgress, Charles Durning, and Andrew Stevens. Its plot follows a former CIA agent who uses a young teenager with psychic powers to help locate his missing telekinetic son, who has been abducted by an agent of a secret government agency.

Produced by Frank Yablans and released by 20th Century Fox on March 15, 1978, this $7.5 million production was both critically and commercially successful, grossing $24 million at domestic box office. At the 6th Saturn Awards, the film won for Best Make-up (William J. Tuttle, Rick Baker).

== Plot ==
In Israel, ex-government agent Peter Sandza and his psychic son Robin meet Ben Childress, Peter's old agency colleague. Sandza plans to leave his old life and return to the United States with his son, but Childress objects and subsequently stages a terrorist attack to cover up kidnapping Robin for his “protection”. Peter narrowly survives, maiming Childress in the attempt and escaping while heavily injured, but is unable to protect Robin.

Months later in Chicago, high-school student Gillian Bellaver discovers her psychic powers, including telekinesis and extra-sensory perception, during an in-class demonstration. The uncontrolled manifestations of these powers harm people who physically touch or provoke her. She volunteers to attend the Paragon Institute, a live-in research facility studying psychic powers in adolescents.

Meanwhile, Peter has tracked Robin to Chicago. After evading Childress' agents, Peter meets with his girlfriend Hester, a Paragon nurse, who tells him about Gillian. Peter tells Gillian that Paragon's director is cooperating with PSI, a covert agency led by Childress that kidnaps psychic children to weaponize their powers for the American government, managing and controlling the psychics by brainwashing them and eliminating their families.

As Gillian's psychic prowess grows, she begins experiencing visions of the Institute abusing Robin, who has unsuccessfully attempted escape, and eventually connects to him telepathically. The Paragon's director, Dr, Jim McKeever is accidentally hurt by Gillian after which he wants to cut her loose. Once Childress becomes aware of Gillian's abilities, he counters McKeever's decision. Knowing that she knows too much and that her telekinetic powers are growing, Childress orders that Gillian be immediately transported to PSI headquarters where Robin is being kept. Hester overhears Childress's conversation and informs Peter, who plans a rescue, hoping she can lead him to Robin.

The rescue is successful, but Hester is killed in the process. Gillian uses her powers to assist Peter in tracking Robin down to a remote mansion in the countryside, where Childress and his handler Susan have spent the last several months grooming and experimenting on him. Though Robin's abilities have grown to unprecedented levels, he gradually becomes increasingly unstable from the psychological strain of his superiors' machinations. While at the amusement park in Old Chicago, Robin suspects a group of Middle Eastern men of being part of the terrorist attack that separated him from his father, and he uses his powers to kill them by sabotaging their ride.

As Peter and Gillian infiltrate the mansion, Robin senses Gillian's presence. Believing that PSI intends to kill him and replace him with Gillian, he snaps, telekinetically torturing and killing Susan. Peter confronts his son, but Robin, now psychotic, furiously attacks him. Robin is thrown out of the window and scratches Peter when he tries to save him from falling. When Robin plunges to the ground, a distraught Peter flings himself after his son, killing himself.

Before Robin dies, he seems to make psychic contact with Gillian and transfers his refined powers to her, implying that she will save herself from Childress and avenge his death. The next morning, Childress tries to ingratiate himself with Gillian. Understanding his long-term intentions, Gillian embraces her psychic abilities and avenges the deaths of Robin and Peter by causing Childress' body to explode, ending his reign of terror upon psychic children once and for all.

== Cast ==
- Kirk Douglas as Peter Sandza
- John Cassavetes as Ben Childress
- Amy Irving as Gillian Bellaver
- Carrie Snodgress as Hester
- Charles Durning as Dr. Jim McKeever
- Andrew Stevens as Robin Sandza
- Fiona Lewis as Dr. Susan Charles
- Carol Rossen as Dr. Ellen Lindstrom
- Rutanya Alda as Kristen
- Joyce Easton as Katharine Bellaver
- William Finley as Raymond Dunwoodie
- Dennis Franz as Bob Eggleston
- Jane Lambert as Vivian Nuckells
- Sam Laws as Blackfish
- J. Patrick McNamara as Robertson
- Alice Nunn as Mrs. Callahan
- Melody Thomas Scott as La Rue
- Hilary Thompson as Cheryl
- Patrick Billingsley as Lander
- Gordon Jump as Nuckells
- J. P. Bumstead as Greene
- Daryl Hannah as Pam
- Laura Innes as Jody

== Production ==
In an interview with The Talks, Brian De Palma said that he had 8 or 9 high-speed cameras to film John Cassavetes exploding in the film's conclusion: "The first time we did it, it didn't work. The body parts didn't go towards the right cameras and this whole set was covered with blood. And it took us almost a week to get back to do take two".

The majority of the film was shot on location in Chicago, except for the opening scene which was shot in Israel. The exteriors of the 'Paragon Institute' was filmed at a historic townhouse in the Astor Street District, which had once been the home of Robert Todd Lincoln. The indoor amusement park sequence was filmed at Old Chicago. The flophouse Peter Sandza escapes from was the Plymouth Hotel in South Loop, which was later used as a location for The Blues Brothers (1980).

Actress Hilary Thompson (Cheryl) had her dialogue redubbed by an uncredited Betty Buckley, who previously worked with De Palma on Carrie.

== Release ==
The Fury opened theatrically in the United States and Canada on March 10, 1978. The film had its New York City and Los Angeles premieres on March 15, 1978.

=== Home media ===
CBS/Fox Video released The Fury on VHS in 1984. The film was later released on DVD by 20th Century Fox Home Entertainment in 2001.

In 2008, 20th Century Fox Home Entertainment remastered The Fury for a planned Blu-ray release, but dwindling home media sales amid the Great Recession ultimately led to the studio scrapping the release. The independent boutique label Twilight Time subsequently licensed the film, releasing a limited edition Blu-ray in the United States limited to 3,000 copies, using the 2008 remaster by 20th Century Fox. This release received some criticism from home media reviewers for its highly filmic appearance and film grain.

In October 2013, Arrow Films released a Blu-ray edition in the United Kingdom featuring a new transfer from the original camera negative, supervised and co-financed by the French film label Carlotta and Australian company Shock. The Arrow Films Blu-ray release was described by Glenn Kenny of The New York Times as boasting a "smoother, less garish look" than that of the Twilight Time disc.

== Reception ==
=== Box office ===
The film opened in 484 theatres in the United States and Canada and grossed $1,917,075. The following weekend it expanded to 518 theatres and grossed $2,777,291 which placed it at number one at the box office for the week.

=== Critical response ===
Roger Ebert of the Chicago Sun-Times gave the film three stars out of four and called it "a stylish entertainment, fast-paced, and acted with great energy. I'm not quite sure it makes a lot of sense, but that's the sort of criticism you only make after it's over. During the movie, too much else is happening."

Arthur D. Murphy of Variety stated that "the film plays very well to an undemanding escapist audience", but "those who have to write about the film are confronted with a gaping hole in the script: Apart from a few throwaway references to government agencies and psychic phenomena, there is never, anywhere, a coherent exposition of what all the running and jumping is about. The more one analyzes the picture, the less substantive its story becomes. Better not to think too much about this one".

Vincent Canby of The New York Times wrote: "The Fury is bigger than Carrie, more elaborate, much more expensive and far sillier ... It's also, in fits and starts, the kind of mindless fun that only a horror movie that so seriously pretends to be about the mind can be. Mr. De Palma seems to have been less interested in the overall movie than in pulling off a couple of spectacular set-pieces, which he does".

Gene Siskel of the Chicago Tribune gave the film one-and-a-half stars out of four and described it as "one of those thrillers where you sit around and wait for the big scenes. And the key word in that sentence is 'wait' because there is little in The Fury to hold your attention in between its three big scenes of extreme violence. That's because the film develops only one character. Its story also makes little sense, and for a movie ostensibly about psychic powers, The Fury contains precious little magic".

Kevin Thomas of the Los Angeles Times wrote that "at any moment The Fury could lapse into the ludicrous, but De Palma's control is so taut and filled with bravura that he makes plausible the most bizarre—and bloody—psychic manifestations, not to mention much physical derring-do. Without indulging in the gratuitous, lingering displays that lead to morbidity, De Palma keeps you at seat's edge. He seems to be able to get away with everything".

Judith Martin of The Washington Post called it a "very slick movie" and "a film for people who like to see blood — lots of blood, blood pouring from unpleasantly unlikely places, such as eyeballs — and not for anyone who doesn't".

Pauline Kael of The New Yorker wrote that "De Palma is one of the few directors in the sound era to make a horror film that is so visually compelling that a viewer seems to have entered a mythic night world. Inside that world, transfixed, we can hear the faint, distant sound of De Palma cackling with pleasure." The music, composed and conducted by John Williams and performed by the London Symphony Orchestra for the LP re-recording, was also highly praised by Kael, who wrote that it "may be as apt and delicately varied a score as any horror movie has ever had."

As of July 2025, the film holds a 79% approval rating on Rotten Tomatoes from 33 reviews. The site's consensus reads: "Brian De Palma reins in his stylistic flamboyance to eerie effect in The Fury, a telekinetic slow burn that rewards patient viewers with its startling set-pieces."

== Accolades ==
Rick Baker and William J. Tuttle both won Best Make-up at the 6th Saturn Awards.

== Sources ==
- Kael, Pauline (1980). When the Lights Go Down. New York City, New York: Henry Holt & Co. ISBN 978-0-030-42511-0.
- Solomon, Aubrey (1989). Twentieth Century Fox: A Corporate and Financial History. Lanham, Maryland: Scarecrow Press. ISBN 979-8-216-29310-1.
