= Bruneri-Canella case =

Notorious judicial and media affair in Italy

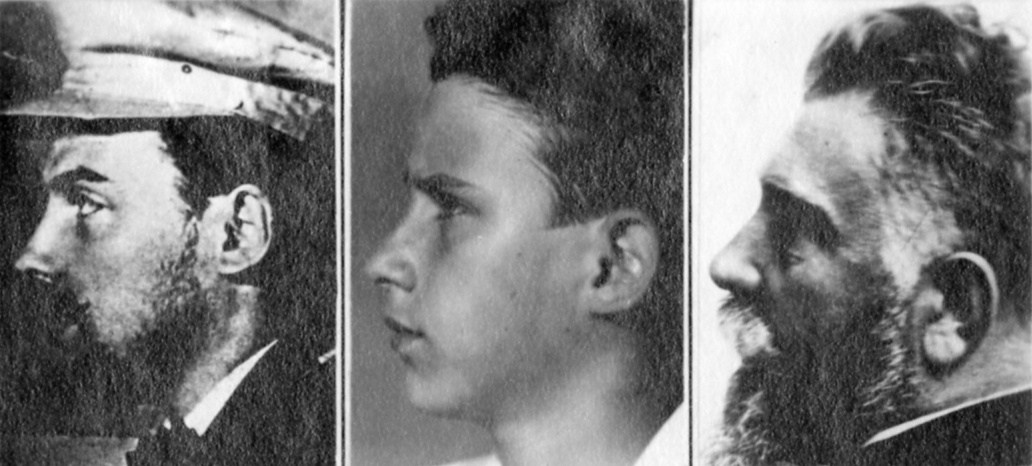
Profile photo of (a) Giulio Canella, (b) Giuseppe Canella, son of Giulio and (c) unknown patient in the Collegno mental asylum

The Bruneri-Canella case, called in Italian the case of the Smemorato di Collegno (the Collegno Amnesiac), is a notorious judicial and media affair concerning the alleged reappearance in 1926 of a man who had gone missing in World War I. The question of his identity was thoroughly discussed in newspapers and in courtrooms, and endured for almost 40 years. Due to nationwide interest in the case, the term smemorato di Collegno has been a common saying since the 1930s, meaning a person who forgets something.

The man was originally identified as Professor Giulio Canella, an Italian philosophy scholar and teacher who had gone missing in action in World War I. His wife, Giulia Concetta Canella, had refused to give up hope of seeing him again. When she saw a newspaper photograph of a man who claimed to have no memory of his past or name, she thought she recognized him. She went to the mental hospital where he had been confined. After a few visits, she became convinced that he was her husband.

However, a few days after he was released to her, an anonymous letter was sent to the Quaestor of Turin, claiming that the man was actually an anarchist and petty criminal with an extensive police record named Mario Bruneri. After an inquiry and several trials and appeals, the court found that he was indeed Bruneri.

During that time, the couple had lived together and had three children. After the final verdict was rendered, they moved to Brazil to get away from the scandal. Bruneri died there in 1941. Giulia Concetta Canella tried without success to have the decision overturned. She died in 1977.

== Background ==
Giulio Canella was born in Padova in 1881. After his studies, he moved to Verona, where he became the principal of a high school specializing in education. In 1909, he founded with Agostino Gemelli the Rivista di filosofia neoscolastica, and in 1916 was among the founders of the newspaper Corriere del mattino, a Roman Catholic opinion newspaper.

He married his cousin Giulia, the daughter of a wealthy landowner who had a successful business in Brazil. The couple had two daughters, the second in 1916.

Mario Bruneri was a typist from Turin, born in 1886. He was homeless, an anarchist, and a petty criminal, wanted since 1922 for fraud and violence.

== The beginning ==
=== Missing in action ===
On 25 November 1916, Canella was serving on the Macedonian front, near Nikopole, as a captain of an infantry company committed to capturing Monastir Hill. The company was caught in a crossfire by Bulgarian soldiers armed with machine guns and was decimated. Among the missing was Canella. Some of his comrades-in-arms reported that he was severely wounded in the head, but was still alive and was taken prisoner by the enemy.

After the ambush, the company fell back and regrouped, counterattacked, and ultimately took the hill despite heavy losses. Medics searched the battlefield, recovering Italian wounded and corpses, but Canella was not found. Some Bulgarian prisoners were questioned, but denied having captured a captain.

Canella was listed as missing in action by the Ministero della Guerra, and a letter was sent to his wife. She never accepted the news, and kept hoping for his return.

=== Enter the amnesiac ===
Eleven years later, on 6 February 1927, the Chi li ha visti? (In English, "Who has seen them?") column of the national newspaper La Domenica del Corriere broke the story of an inmate of the Collegno Mental Hospital, confined there since 10 March 1926. The man had been found by the caretaker of the Jewish graveyard stealing a copper vase. When apprehended by the Carabinieri, he had been strolling around Turin, crying and threatening suicide. The 45-year-old man had a full beard, and claimed to have no recollection of his past or his name.

The Quaestor of Turin ordered him put in the mental hospital, in the hope that he would recover his memory. The man was well behaved and calm, and exhibited to the staff signs of some education. They diagnosed a "mental block" that prevented him from remembering his history and identity. The man was classified as Inconnu ("unknown", much like a John Doe), and given the number 44170.

Giulia Concetta Canella saw the photograph of him in the newspaper, and thought to have found her beloved lost husband. She asked to visit, and on 27 February 1927, she was granted a meeting with the man.

=== Meetings at the hospital ===
Great care was placed in the handling of the meeting, in order to hide from the patient that the encounter had been prearranged. The man had shown signs of fear and psychological stress when confronted with staff members or visitors, so the meeting was to look to him like a random occurrence.

The man was taken for a stroll in the cloister of the hospital, and crossed Giulia Canella's path without showing any emotion or sign he recognized her. Canella stated that the man was her husband beyond doubt. On a second attempt the day later, the man told his psychiatrists that he vaguely recognized the woman, and that some recollections were resurfacing in his mind. In the third meeting, the woman broke into tears, and the man hugged her, apparently recognizing his wife. On the same afternoon, a fourth encounter convinced the doctors that the man was indeed Canella, who told them about some vague recollections about his children. More encounters were scheduled to aid in memory recovery, but the man was now considered identified.

In March 1927, the patient was officially recognized as Professor Canella and sent back to Verona with his wife. The story of a man lost in the war and returning to his family after ten years received a lot of news coverage, sparking hope in many other people who had also lost relatives in the conflict. The usually moderate Turin newspaper La Stampa printed the emphatic headline "A cry, a shiver, a hug, the light".

Despite newspapers covering the story, no interviews were granted. No one knew what he had done in the nine years since he went missing.

=== Arrest ===
On 3 March 1927, just a few days after the apparently happy ending, an unsigned letter was received by the Quaestor of Turin stating that the man was not Canella, but instead Mario Bruneri, a typist from Turin born in 1886, an anarchist and con artist wanted since 1922 due to some convictions for acts of violence.

Bruneri was not new to jails: he had served time for accounting fraud and stealing. His criminal record was extensive. He was wanted in other cities, including Pavia and Milan, along with a woman from Brescia, Camilla Ghidini. She had a long criminal record too, with crimes against property and prostitution.

The records about Bruneri included a detailed physical and psychological profiling, perfectly matching the character and aspect of the amnesiac. On Sunday, 6 March 1927, the quaestor, firmly convinced he had been tricked, arranged for the arrest of Bruneri, who was brought back to Turin the same day.

Two days later, Bruneri's relatives were called in for an identification: his wife, Rosa Negro, recognized him immediately, as did their 14-year-old son, Giuseppino. His sisters Maria and Matilda and his brother Felice confirmed his identity. Bruneri had been missing for six years, when he fled the family to live with Camilla Ghidini. Bruneri refused to admit knowing the family, and faked a fainting. Another woman named Milly who had a love affair with him recognized him as Bruneri as well.

Bruneri's mother, Eugenia Mantaud, was not involved in the identification, being weak of heart. The identification was contested by Giulia Canella's attorneys on the grounds that the mother had not been allowed to see the man, claiming she would have foiled the whole Bruneri family plot orchestrated in conjunction with the quaestor and police. Eugenia died two days later on 4 July 1929 of heart failure, causing some embarrassment to Canella's attorneys.

=== Inquiry ===
The quaestor ordered fingerprints to be taken, and had them compared with those from Bruneri's criminal records. Fingerprints had been sent to the central police archive in Rome when the man was initially arrested, but no match was found after a superficial search of the huge archive. The second try proved to be 100% positive, and the Scientific Investigation School of Rome wired back a telegram confirming that Bruneri and the alleged amnesiac were the same person. Bruneri was a fugitive and had to serve two years from previous sentences, so he was jailed in the Collegno mental hospital while awaiting further trials.

Giulia Canella fought the allegations and began a long campaign of appeals to the Turin Court, asking for the man to be set free on the premise that he was not Bruneri. The famous attorney and jurist Francesco Carnelutti offered to defend Bruneri, along with the lawyer and fascist gerarca (National Fascist Party member) Roberto Farinacci. Carnelutti, with the aid of political pressure, managed to have the man released on 23 December 1927. The Turin Court stated that no certain proof of the man being Bruneri had been presented, despite the identification from the criminal records.

Bruneri's mother, after learning of the developments, stated that she was sure beyond doubt that the case was another scam by her son, that being his style. Rosa Negro and Felice Bruneri (Mario Bruneri's wife and brother) challenged the court decision in order to obtain an executive order from the court to bring Bruneri back to his duty to his wife and his mother.

== Trials ==
=== Chronology ===
- 28 December 1927. The Turin Criminal Court declares the man's identity unproven despite the questor's identification and Coppola's neuropsychiatric analysis.
- Early 1928. Bruneri family challenges the decision in the Turin Civil Court
- 15 November 1928. The Turin Civil Court acknowledges the complete and sure identification of the man as Mario Bruneri, rejecting further requests from the Canella family.
- 24 March 1930. The Corte di Cassazione voids the Turin Civil Court finding due to procedural errors. The Canella family is granted the right to present further evidence in their favor.
- 2 May 1931. After a new trial is held, the Florence Appeal Court reinstates the Turin Court's verdict, rejecting the Cassazione's request and denying further prolonging of the trial.
- 25 December 1931. After another appeal from the Canellas, the Cassazione denies a further reexamination of the case. The decision is a close call, with the 14 judges equally divided. Ultimately, the commission president asks to consult with the Minister of Justice, Alfredo Rocco, and votes against a new trial. Bruneri identification is confirmed again.
- 1946. A further request for a reopening of the case is rejected, since the outcome is not considered a "fascist political sentence", thus not subject to a new law requiring reviews of trials of prosecuted political opponents.
- 1964, Giuseppe Canella, son of Giulio Canella, asks to reopen the case, but is denied.

=== The civil trial ===
On 22 October 1928, the civil trial began, lasting over two years and ending with a solid identification of the man as Mario Bruneri. High-profile witnesses were brought into the debate, including Father Agostino Gemelli and Earl Giuseppe della Torre. The former had worked with Canella at the Rivista di Filosofia Neoscolastica, the latter was a co-founder of the Corriere del Mattino and director of the Catholic newspaper L'Osservatore Romano. Gemelli and Dalla Torre both stated that the man was not in any way Canella. They were important representatives of the Roman Catholic hierarchy, and independently chose to testify. They were accused by Canella's attorneys -despite Carnelutti being a close friend of the Church himself- of being part of a secret plot to hurt the family.

The Italian Army never removed Canella's name from its list of missing in action, stating that nothing had suggested that the man was Canella.

An appeal from Giulia Canella was rejected by the Turin's Appeal Court on 7 August 1929. The family took the matter to the Corte di Cassazione, which on 11 March 1930 agreed to consider the case and ultimately allowed a new trial to be held in a new courtroom. Cassazione pointed out a procedural error by the Turin judges: they had denied Canella the chance to bring further evidence in his favor, in particular a new psychological survey and more examination of the fingerprints. That was required since the evidence presented by the public prosecutor came from a civil trial, not a criminal one, and could be lacking in "formal rigor".

The man kept living with Giulia Concetta Canella. They had three children. Elisa was born on 21 November 1928, Camillo on 31 December 1929 and Maria on 12 September 1931. According to Italian law, they were not sons of the still missing Giulio Canella; they were registered in Brazil thanks to the influence of Giulia's father.

In Florence, the Canellas' appeal was rejected again, and the man was sent to the Carceri Nuove jail to serve the remaining two years of Bruneri's sentences. He was later transferred to the Pallanza jailhouse.

Giulia Canella asked for help from her friend Giuseppe Parisi, an army's captain, and Germano Alberti, a priest. They suggested going to the Corte di Cassazione again.

=== Public opinion ===
On 11 March 1927, just a few days after the unsigned letter accusing Bruneri, an official bulletin was published by Agenzia Stefani, the censorship organ and news agency of the National Fascist Party, stating that the man was a fake in the eyes of the party. Newspapers had to conform to the agency's directives, called veline.

The case gave a big boost to newspaper sales, and many news providers over time sided with or against the Canella family. Two informal groups, the canellians and brunerians, emerged.

Canellians cited as evidence the culture and education shown by the man while in the mental hospital. Bruneri was a rough and uneducated man, so the unknown man had to be Canella, the wealthy and educated professor. The man had been recognized by 25 members and friends of Canella family, and 145 other people.

Brunerians responded that Bruneri was well educated himself, having studied in institutes like the ones where Professor Canella received his formal education. Moreover, they had on their side the scientific evidence of fingerprints and many witnesses, among them Gemelli and Della Torre. It was found that Bruneri, when young, had been fond of philosophy, and had studied the subject himself.

In 1931, the neuropsychiatric expert Alfredo Coppola, an expert in war traumas, published Il caso Bruneri-Canella all'esame neuropsichiatrico (studio psicobiografico e medico-legale). He confirmed that the man was none other than Bruneri, and that the amnesia was plainly faked. Extremely advanced methods of cognitive analysis were used in the study. The work was so advanced for its time that it is still considered a milestone in neuropsychiatry. Coppola's work gained him the chair of Palermo University Department of Clinical Neurosciences.

Other eminent contemporary scholars, among them Mario Carrara (son-in-law of Cesare Lombroso and his successor as director of the Forensic Medicine department) and Ernesto Lugaro agreed with Coppola. Among the dissenting scholars were Giovanni Mingazzini, Calligaris, Perrando and Pellegrini.

=== Final sentence ===
In 1931, the Cassazione Court confirmed Bruneri's identity and his remaining jail time. Among the 14 judges, seven were in favor and seven against. The Court president had to cast the deciding vote, and called Minister of Justice Alfredo Rocco to ask for three more days of debate. Rocco refused, saying "I'm not giving you an hour more. Let's close this clown show now".

The court declared the couple's three children illegitimate, and their union "against public morals". A newspaper inquiry found that the man showed no sign of a gun wound to the head, as Canella would have had.

None of the five trials acknowledged the man to be Canella. The identification of Mario Bruneri was confirmed by all the trials except the first.

=== Exile in Brazil ===
Giulia Canella lived more uxorio (as man and wife) with Bruneri: that brought scandal to her and harmed her reputation. Her father, concerned about the damage to the family name, forced her to move to Brazil along with her sons and her alleged husband (as soon as he was released from jail). Some newspapers stated that Canella herself was now convinced that he was not her husband, but had to keep pretending otherwise to avoid a major scandal. Slander and malicious allegations about the issue became common.

The Brazilian government legally recognized the couple's sons and gave them the name Canella. The man registered as Julio Canella, and his title of "Professor" was legally validated. They moved to Rio de Janeiro, where the man occasionally worked on local newspapers, studied philosophy and gave some lectures.

Bruneri wrote to Pope Pius XI about some of his philosophical thoughts. The Vatican secretary answered, addressing the letter to the "Ill.mo signor dottor Giulio Canella" (English: "Most illustrious Mister Doctor Giulio Canella"). He died in Rio de Janeiro on 12 December 1941. Canella tried again to have the verdict overturned, until she died in 1977.

== Further discoveries ==
=== Account of alleged meeting between Canella and Bruneri ===
After the trial was over, an English noblewoman living in Milan wrote a letter to the court under the name "Mrs Taylor". The woman asked for a meeting to give her account of a story. In 1923, she gave shelter to a homeless man found wandering in the streets, dressed in an old military uniform. She gave him a meal, new clothes and some food. She nicknamed him "The Tramp" (Il Randagio). Later they met again; moved by his politeness, she became his friend.

The homeless man told her that he had fought in the Great War, and he was sure he had a family. Unfortunately, he was experiencing the consequences of a trauma, was psychologically unstable and could not remember his identity, where his family lived and many other details. He came to know a local girl, a salesgirl of dairy products, and he introduced her to the noblewoman. The two became friends and often talked about "The Tramp": from their combined experiences, the women became suspicious about the man's real identity, and ultimately began thinking that the Tramp was actually two very similar-looking men. That would explain his mood changes, the inconsistency of his stories, and his forgetfulness of details and memories from day to day. The suspicion was apparently confirmed when the noblewoman gave a jacket to the man, which was ultimately found among Bruneri's possessions. Bruneri was indeed living in Milan at the time with Camilla Ghidini, wanted by police.

Taylor alleged that the good-hearted Canella was the original Tramp. She speculated that Bruneri must have joined him in his life on the street, and the two became close friends, thanks to their physical resemblance. Bruneri later came to know many facts about Canella's life (but details were missing due to the man's mental condition), and when he feared that the police were on his track, he devised a plan to steal Canella's identity and hide in a mental hospital. When Canella's wife came to see him, he seized the chance to escape his criminal past.

=== Bruneri's letters ===
In 1960, new information about the case came to light. Felice Bruneri, Mario's brother, showed five letters sent by his brother to their mother while in the mental hospital. In the letters, he explained his situation and asked for the family's help, since he was hungry and repentant for his crimes.

The letters were published 19 years after Bruneri's death. However, few of his other writings had survived, so they could not be scientifically compared for handwriting. Nevertheless, the letters are nowadays still considered one of the most reliable clues about the man's true identity. The brother was sorry for not having shown the letters before, but was fearful of shaming the family name and his mother. Despite the great span of time that had elapsed, the letters elicited strong reactions from the canellians, who tried to get a new trial to clear Giulio Canella's name.

=== Denial: heirs and the Church ===
In 1964, Beppino Canella, the first son of Giulio Canella, gave a public speech reasserting that the man was his father.

Don Germano Alberti, a friend of Giulia Canella, nominated Giulio Cannella for beatification. The request was ultimately refused. After much lobbying from Canella heirs and friends, on 10 June 1970, the Roman Catholic Church officially released a press statement by Cardinal and Secretary of the Vatican State Giovanni Benelli, asserting that in the Church's eyes, the man was Giulio Canella, and his sons were to be considered legitimate. The statement clashed with the court findings and the new evidence uncovered, but was presented as certain despite being supported by nothing other than testimonies.

== Political aspects ==
The case broke at a very delicate time politically, when the newly elected Fascist regime was beginning to face the many social problems of a divided country. The intellectual elite was divided. Many Catholic higher-ups sided with the brunerians, despite the official position of the Church in the following years. Politicians and journalists, especially from the liberal wing, sided with the canellians.

The story was used by certain politicians as a means of distracting the public from the commission writing the Lateran Treaty, the agreement between the Church and the Italian state that gave the former more authority, a trick by Benito Mussolini to gain the support from the Catholic electorate, while risking protests from the then strong Liberal party. Leonardo Sciascia wrote about the political use of the story in Il teatro della memoria.

Mussolini, while using the trials to his advantage, became concerned about the whole matter. When the case itself turned out to be a divisive issue among clerics and liberals, he intervened, trying to reduce its exposure in the national mass media. Ultimately, he ordered the newspapers to stop writing about it.

== Scientific importance ==
The case was a landmark for the judicial process. Science, especially forensics disciplines such as handwriting comparison and psychiatric analysis, became a common tool in trials. The case marked one of the first uses of scientific fingerprint analysis in the legal system in Italy.

Psychology received media attention, and the now famous experts who had worked on the Bruneri-Canella case were instrumental in the birth of many psychological study institutes. Stefano Zago underlined how in this case Coppola developed cognitive evaluation methods still in use nowadays.

== Popular culture ==
Luigi Pirandello was inspired by the case when writing Come tu mi vuoi, a three-act drama first staged in Milan in 1930.

In 1936, actor Angelo Musco was the star of Lo Smemorato, a theatrical adaptation of the story.

In 1962, the movie Lo smemorato di Collegno by Sergio Corbucci was released, with Totò as the star.

In 1970, RAI aired two episodes of Processi a porte aperte about the case on 11 and 13 August. Bruneri's nephews tried to have the broadcast blocked, as did Canella's wife and Don Germano Alberti. The petition started by the priest received only about three hundred supporters.

Pasquale Festa Campanile presented at the Venice Film Festival the movie A Proper Scandal in 1984: he presented the story, but left the final open for interpretation.

In 1988 in Collegno, an exhibition titled Sconosciuto a me stesso was held. French writer Jean Giraudoux was inspired by the case for Sigfrid et le Limousin.

in 1993, Bruneri-Canella case was presented in final episode "The Unknown" (Neznámý) of Czech krimi series Adventure of Criminalistics (Dobrodružství kriminalistiky), where Bruneri-Canella was portrayed by Czech actor Jiří Schmitzer.

The case is mentioned in Umberto Eco's 2004 novel The Mysterious Flame of Queen Loana.

Radio host Fiorello created a character named lo smemorato di Cologno on his show on Radio Due. The voice was an imitation of Silvio Berlusconi (Cologno being the headquarters of his TV channels). The character lost his memory every time issues about political promises, social issues or an opposing politician were named. Berlusconi himself played the role in the last broadcast before the winter holidays in 2006.

Rai Uno produced a TV movie named Lo smemorato di Collegno by Maurizio Zaccaro.

On 1 April 2009, the TV show Chi l'ha visto by Rai 3 (a show investigating missing people) asked the Carabinieri RIS to examine the letters sent by Canella from the war front with the letters presented by Bruneri's brother in order to compare any traces of DNA. The examination proved inconclusive.

French 2018 movie : L'inconnu de Collegno, directed by Maïder Fortuné.

== Bibliography ==
- Parisi Giuseppe, Giulio e Giulia Canella nel fosco dramma giudiziario dello "Sconosciuto di Collegno", ed. Bettinelli, Verona, 1946
- Milo Julini, Paolo Berruti, Maurizio Celia, Massimo Centini, Indagine sullo smemorato di Collegno, Ananke editore, Torino 2004
- Recluso n.5027, Lettere del reclusorio, con prefazione di Francesco Carnelutti, Padova, 1931; in 8, pp. 94, Carteggio tra Giulio Canella e i suoi familiari.
- Malingering and retrograde amnesia: The historic case of the collegno amnesic, Zago Stefano, Sartori Giuseppe, Scarlato Guglielmo, ed. Masson, Milano, in Cortex n.40, pp. 519–32, 2004.
- Felice Bruneri, La vita dell'uomo di Collegno narrata da suo fratello, Venezia, Avaldo Grassi, 1931.
- Francesco Canella, Lettera aperta al signor Ugo Sorrentino della scuola scientifica di polizia di Roma su la tragica beffa di Collegno, Rio de Janeiro, Graphica Sauer, 1938
- Alfredo Coppola, Il caso Bruneri-Canella all'esame neuropsichiatrico. Studio psico-biografico e medico-legale sullo Sconosciuto di Collegno, Siena, Stabilimento tipografico San Bernardino, 1931
- Benedetto Ferretti, Le impronte culturali dopo le impronte digitali ovvero Mario Bruneri svelato da se stesso. Appunti sulle cosiddette memorie del cosiddetto smemorato prof. Giulio Canella, Milano, Arti Grafiche Mario Sejmand, 1931
- Giulio Canella, Alla ricerca di me stesso - Autodifesa, Verona, Edizione R. Cabianca, 1930
- Vincenzo Vescovi, Una causa celebre. Bruneri – Canella. Ricordi e curiosità, Treviso, Longo & Zoppelli Editori, 1942
- Germano Alberti, Eppure...era Canella, Verona, Libreria Dante, 1960
- Leonardo Sciascia Il teatro della memoria, Milano, Adelphi, 1981
- Lisa Roscioni, Lo smemorato di Collegno. Storia italiana di un'identità contesa, Torino Einaudi, 2007
- Fabrizio Boscaglia, Desmemoriado: Echi dello Smemorato di Collegno nella cultura luso-brasiliana - Ecos do Desmemoriado de Collegno na cultura luso-brasileira, Lisboa, Subterrânea, 2025
- g. gh. L'enigma Bruneri-Canella alla ribalta della pretura, Torino, La Stampa, 16 ottobre 1953, pag 6
