= Bromma Parish =

Bromma Parish Bromma församling
- Parish
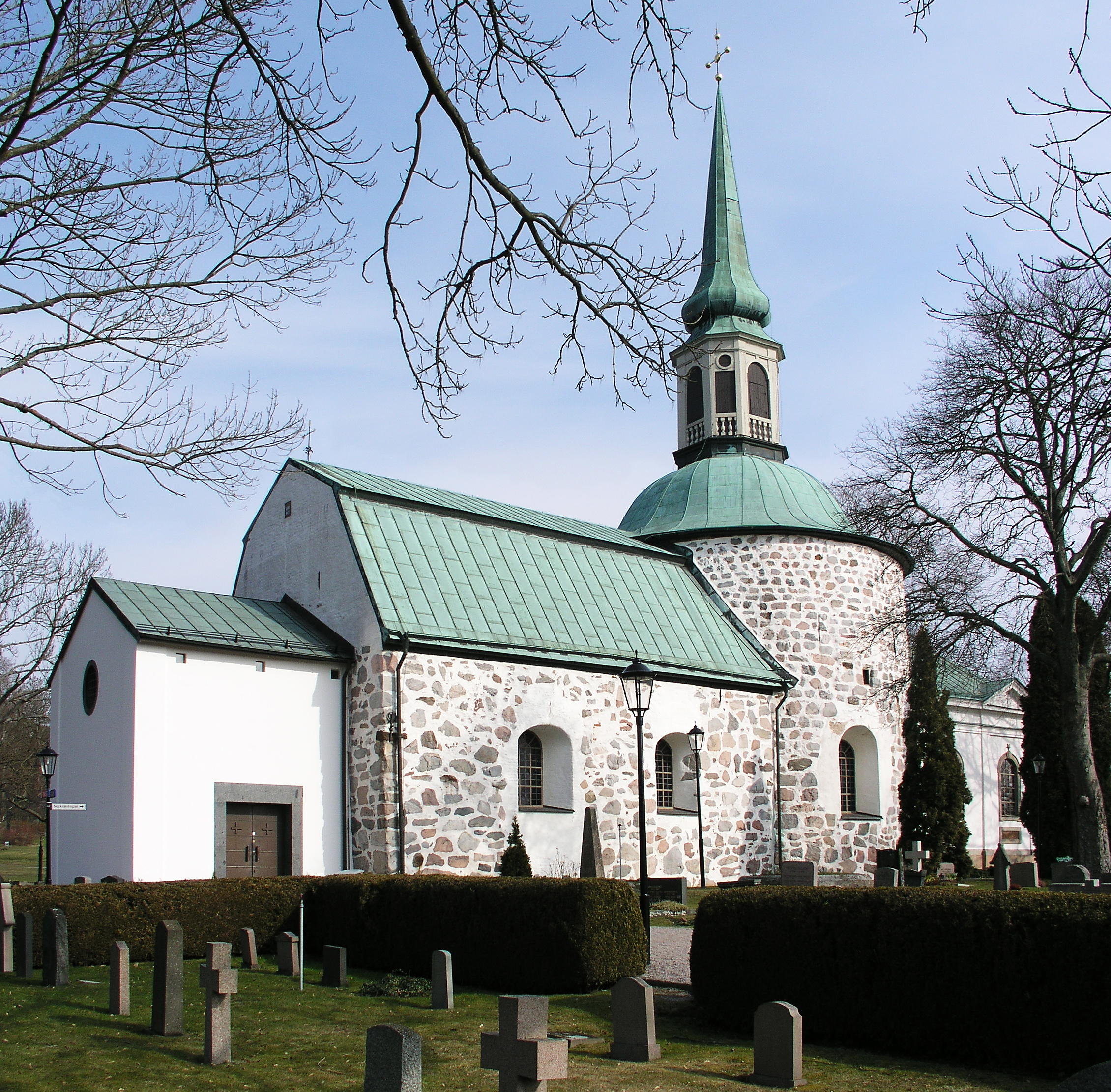
- Bromma Church

- Location within Stockholm Location within Sweden
- Coordinates: 59°20′16″N 17°56′25″E
- Country: Sweden
- Municipality: Stockholm Municipality
- Religious congregation: Church of Sweden
- Diocese: Diocese of Stockholm
- Founded: 1896

Population (31 December 2019)
  - Total: 51,155
- Parish code: 018020 (1955-01-01–1956-12-31); 018023 (1957-01-01–1966-12-31); 018027 (1967-01-01–)
- Pastorship code: 130614
- Website: www.svenskakyrkan.se/bromma

Bromma Parish (Swedish: Bromma församling) is a parish in Birka church district (kontrakt) in the Diocese of Stockholm, Sweden. The parish is located in Stockholm Municipality in Stockholm County. The parish forms its own pastorship. The parish is located in Västerort and includes the districts Södra Ängby, Norra Ängby, Bromma kyrka, Blackeberg, Mariehäll, Åkeslund and Riksby.

== History ==
When the land ice retreated north from Stockholm, the whole of Bromma was still under water. Southern Bromma first rose out of the sea, followed by the northern part which became a rich agricultural area from about year 0 to the Viking Age. It would not be until the 19th century before Bromma had such a large population again. During the Viking Age, Bromma had plenty of watercourses and most of Bromma's most important villages and farms during the Viking Age and the Middle Ages (such as Ulvsunda, Linta, Glia, Nora, Riksby and Nockeby) were located by the strait that stretched from the current Ulvsundasjön-Lillsjön-Brommaplan-Judarn. In southern Bromma, however, there was another large village, Alsten. During the Middle Ages, various Catholic church institutions were the largest land and farm owners in Bromma, such as St. Clare's Priory. Until the 17th century, Bromma had been a small parish, but at this time was placed under St. Clara Parish (S:ta Clara församling) and later became an annex to Riddarholm Parish (Riddarholmsförsamlingen). It was not until 1896 that Bromma became an independent parish. A strong population increase and the growth of the new residential towns resulted in the parish being divided in 1955, when Västerled and Essinge Parishes were added.

== Organisation ==
Bromma Parish was a local authority within the Bromma church district (kontrakt) (has previously belonged to Roslag's western church district until 1942, Stockholm church district until 1942 and Svartsjö church district until 1961) in Diocese of Stockholm until the change of relationship between the Church of Sweden and the Swedish state at the turn of the year 1999/2000. The Parish Clergy (part of the authority) was until 30 June 1991 responsible for the population registration and has from 1 July 1991 been responsible for the parish registration of its parishioners. The select vestry (kyrkofullmäktige) has been the parish's decision-making body. The parochial church council (kyrkorådet) has been the parish board and has had the ongoing responsibility for the administration and execution of decisions. The select vestry was added in 1932 and in 1934 the cemetery administration was taken over by the then newly established Stockholm City Cemeteries Authority (Stockholms stads kyrkogårdsnämnd). Until 1933, the parochial church council had been responsible for the funeral service, but after a decision by the select vestry, the responsibility was transferred to the cemeteries authority.

== Churches ==
- Bromma Church, is Stockholm's oldest building and probably began to be built in the 1160s as a round church.
- Ängby Church, in Blackeberg was inaugurated in 1959.
- Mariehäll Church, is built into a large monumental building in Mariehäll, which in addition to the church also houses meeting rooms and a number of apartments. In 1972, the original church hall was inaugurated as a church, but the building itself dates from 1925.
- Famnen, is Bromma Parish's latest church facility and was inaugurated in 1986.

== See also ==
- Bromma socken
