= 2010 Stockholm county election =

Swedish local election

Stockholm County held a county council election on 19 September 2010 on the same day as the general and municipal elections.

== Results ==
There were 149 seats, the same number as in 2006. The Moderates became the largest party, winning 57 seats, a gain of two from the previous election. The party received about 36.7% of the overall vote of 1,254,844.

Party	Votes	%	Seats	±
Moderates	460,871	36.7	57	+2
Social Democrats	321,268	25.6	39	-4
Green Party	121,660	9.7	15	+5
People's Party	116,858	9.2	15	–1
Left Party	77,578	6.2	10	0
Christian Democrats	59,273	4.7	7	-2
Centre Party	47,956	3.8	6	0
Sweden Democrats	35,496	2.8	0	0
Others	13,884	1.1	0	0
Invalid/blank votes	15,965			
Total	1,270,809	100	149	0
Source:val.se

== Municipal & Stockholm ward results ==
Stockholm Municipality was divided into six separate electoral wards (Södermalm-Enskede, Bromma-Kungsholmen, Norrmalm-Östermalm-Gamla Stan, Östra Söderort, Västra Söderort and Yttre Västerort) and its results were not counted as a unit. These wards have in these lists been translated to English to shorten columns.

Location	Turnout	Share	Votes	M	S	MP	FP	V	KD	C	SD	Other
Botkyrka	72.4	3.4	42,898	26.9	40.2	6.8	6.4	7.8	5.2	2.0	3.9	0.7
Danderyd	88.8	1.6	20,078	56.2	8.0	4.7	13.2	1.3	8.5	6.6	0.9	0.4
Ekerö	87.7	1.3	15,935	46.9	17.3	8.7	10.3	3.2	6.2	4.6	2.4	0.5
Haninge	77.7	3.5	44,297	33.9	33.4	7.1	7.0	5.2	4.2	2.9	4.7	1.5
Huddinge	78.3	4.4	54,596	36.8	29.6	7.6	8.1	5.5	4.7	2.9	4.0	0.8
Järfälla	81.6	3.2	40,142	35.1	30.4	7.5	8.8	5.3	5.6	2.8	3.9	0.7
Lidingö	86.2	2.2	28,119	50.8	11.9	6.4	13.8	2.2	6.7	5.8	1.9	0.7
Nacka	84.2	4.4	54,902	44.8	19.6	9.2	10.2	4.2	5.1	3.8	1.9	1.0
Norrtälje	80.5	2.8	35,516	34.7	30.1	7.1	7.1	4.6	3.7	8.4	3.8	0.4
Nykvarn	84.3	0.4	5,567	37.5	30.4	6.4	7.9	2.7	3.8	4.2	5.8	1.2
Nynäshamn	80.2	1.3	16,077	31.1	41.6	5.2	5.2	4.7	3.9	3.2	4.5	0.6
Salem	84.0	0.7	9,217	38.5	27.4	7.5	9.4	4.1	5.1	4.1	3.4	0.6
Sigtuna	78.4	1.8	22,949	35.2	35.9	5.7	7.3	3.5	4.9	3.5	3.3	0.6
Sollentuna	84.1	3.1	39,069	42.8	22.0	7.3	10.9	4.1	6.1	3.9	2.2	0.6
Solna	79.7	3.4	42,921	38.3	24.5	10.0	9.6	6.4	4.6	3.4	2.1	1.1
Stockholm NE	85.8	7.7	96,086	50.3	11.6	8.9	12.1	4.1	5.5	4.7	1.6	1.1
Stockholm NW	73.1	6.1	76,224	27.4	37.2	9.1	7.9	7.7	4.5	2.3	3.0	1.0
Stockholm S	85.5	8.7	109,534	29.3	22.3	16.9	9.1	11.1	3.3	4.0	1.9	2.1
Stockholm SE	77.8	6.6	83,381	24.0	32.1	14.2	7.0	11.3	3.5	2.6	3.5	1.7
Stockholm SW	79.4	6.6	83,000	27.8	28.8	14.0	8.0	10.2	3.4	3.2	3.0	1.7
Stockholm W	86.1	6.9	86,995	43.0	15.3	11.1	12.3	5.1	5.2	4.8	2.0	1.2
Sundbyberg	78.5	1.9	23,360	33.2	30.4	9.7	8.5	7.3	3.7	3.0	3.1	1.0
Södertälje	73.5	3.7	46,489	25.9	38.2	8.7	5.9	6.3	4.5	3.7	4.7	2.1
Tyresö	84.2	2.1	26,370	41.2	27.1	8.3	8.6	4.0	4.4	3.0	2.9	0.6
Täby	87.3	3.3	41,162	51.1	13.8	5.5	16.2	1.8	5.7	4.1	1.4	0.4
Upplands-Bro	80.4	1.1	14,134	32.4	32.5	7.0	8.4	4.7	7.1	3.2	4.1	0.5
Upplands Väsby	79.0	1.9	23,228	34.7	31.3	7.3	8.9	5.5	5.2	3.1	3.5	0.6
Vallentuna	84.6	1.4	18,186	42.6	20.4	7.8	9.3	3.2	5.4	7.9	2.9	0.6
Vaxholm	87.9	0.6	7,008	49.4	17.8	7.8	10.0	3.0	4.4	5.6	1.6	0.5
Värmdö	84.4	1.8	23,187	43.4	23.6	8.6	8.1	3.8	4.6	3.9	3.1	0.9
Österåker	84.2	1.9	24,217	45.0	22.8	7.6	9.9	3.2	5.1	3.6	2.2	0.4
Total	81.1	100.0	1,254,844	36.7	25.6	9.7	9.3	6.2	4.7	3.8	2.8	1.1
Source: val.se
