= 2014 Stockholm county election =

Regional council election in Stockholm County, Sweden

Stockholm County held a county council election on 14 September 2014 on the same day as the general and municipal elections.

== Results ==
There were 149 seats, the same number as in 2010. The Moderates became the largest party, winning 43 seats, a loss of 14 from the previous election. The party received about 28.2% of the overall vote of 1,355,612.

Party	Votes	%	Seats	±
Moderates	381,667	28.2	43	–14
Social Democrats	358,324	26.4	41	+2
Green Party	135,992	10.0	15	0
People's Party	111,676	8.2	13	–2
Left Party	104,479	7.7	12	+2
Sweden Democrats	79,452	5.9	9	+9
Christian Democrats	75,529	5.6	9	+2
Centre Party	58,906	4.3	7	+1
Feminist Initiative	35,177	2.6	0	0
Others	14,410	1.1	0	0
Invalid/blank votes	14,269			
Total	1,369,881	100	149	0
Source:val.se

== Municipal & Stockholm ward results ==
Stockholm Municipality was divided into six separate electoral wards (Södermalm-Enskede, Bromma-Kungsholmen, Norrmalm-Östermalm-Gamla Stan, Östra Söderort, Västra Söderort and Yttre Västerort) and its results were not counted as a unit. These wards have in these lists been translated to English to shorten columns.

Location	Turnout	Share	Votes	M	S	MP	FP	V	SD	KD	C	F!	Other
Botkyrka	70.7	3.3	45,395	19.8	39.9	8.6	5.1	7.8	7.7	6.4	2.3	1.2	1.1
Danderyd	88.9	1.5	20,954	45.8	9.8	5.2	15.3	1.9	2.7	11.8	6.0	1.0	0.6
Ekerö	87.9	1.2	16,934	37.1	19.9	9.5	8.6	4.3	5.2	7.7	5.9	1.3	0.6
Haninge	77.5	3.5	47,385	26.5	34.2	7.9	5.7	9.2	5.9	4.4	3.3	1.3	1.6
Huddinge	77.6	4.3	58,515	27.8	30.8	8.8	6.6	6.7	7.7	5.1	3.7	1.6	1.3
Järfälla	81.6	3.2	42,807	27.3	32.6	7.9	6.6	7.0	6.9	6.1	3.4	1.3	1.0
Lidingö	86.4	2.2	29,315	40.2	13.7	7.2	13.9	2.8	3.5	9.5	7.2	1.4	0.5
Nacka	85.0	4.4	59,525	35.1	21.5	10.4	9.3	5.5	4.3	5.9	5.0	2.1	0.9
Norrtälje	82.8	2.8	38,065	25.5	33.6	6.7	6.4	5.3	8.5	4.0	8.0	1.1	0.9
Nykvarn	85.6	0.4	6,028	29.0	32.2	5.8	5.1	3.4	12.3	5.4	4.9	0.9	0.9
Nynäshamn	80.7	1.3	16,995	24.5	34.6	6.9	6.1	6.3	10.0	4.7	4.7	1.3	0.9
Salem	84.7	0.7	9,868	29.7	29.6	7.7	8.4	5.3	6.4	5.9	4.8	1.3	0.9
Sigtuna	77.1	1.8	25,046	28.5	33.8	6.5	5.6	5.3	8.5	5.6	4.3	1.1	1.0
Sollentuna	84.0	3.1	42,341	34.8	24.0	8.5	9.5	4.9	4.5	7.2	4.2	1.3	1.0
Solna	80.5	3.5	47,591	28.3	26.3	10.8	8.5	8.5	4.7	5.6	4.0	2.2	1.1
Stockholm NE	86.6	7.6	102,762	40.5	12.5	9.1	12.4	5.3	3.9	7.4	5.3	2.9	0.8
Stockholm NW	71.2	6.0	80,812	20.7	37.5	9.7	6.1	9.6	5.8	4.6	2.6	2.1	1.3
Stockholm S	87.2	8.6	116,613	21.1	22.0	16.1	7.8	13.9	4.2	3.6	4.2	6.2	0.9
Stockholm SE	78.9	6.7	91,432	17.2	31.2	13.5	5.1	14.1	6.2	3.2	3.0	5.0	1.5
Stockholm SW	80.5	6.8	92,749	20.0	28.6	13.4	6.4	12.8	5.2	3.6	3.6	5.1	1.2
Stockholm W	87.2	7.2	98,139	33.2	17.0	11.7	11.3	6.6	4.3	6.4	5.4	3.3	0.8
Sundbyberg	79.1	2.0	26,505	24.8	32.5	10.0	6.8	8.4	6.6	4.3	3.5	1.8	1.3
Södertälje	71.6	3.6	48,495	20.5	35.6	8.0	5.3	6.9	10.2	6.5	4.0	1.4	1.7
Tyresö	85.8	2.1	28,632	32.3	29.2	8.6	7.0	5.2	6.6	5.0	3.7	1.3	1.1
Täby	87.8	3.2	43,947	40.4	16.0	6.6	16.1	2.5	3.6	8.1	5.2	0.9	0.6
Upplands-Bro	81.4	1.1	15,236	25.0	34.2	6.5	7.6	5.5	8.6	7.0	3.4	0.9	1.4
Upplands Väsby	79.1	1.8	25,023	26.1	34.5	7.4	6.7	6.9	7.1	5.7	3.2	0.9	1.6
Vallentuna	86.2	1.5	19,994	32.3	23.4	8.4	9.0	3.9	6.6	6.2	7.3	1.3	1.6
Vaxholm	88.3	0.5	7,337	36.2	20.6	9.5	10.1	4.0	3.3	7.3	7.2	1.1	0.6
Värmdö	86.2	1.9	25,366	32.9	26.2	8.3	7.7	4.6	7.1	5.5	4.9	1.9	0.7
Österåker	84.8	1.9	25,806	33.8	25.8	8.0	9.2	4.1	5.8	6.4	5.3	1.0	0.7
Total	81.5	100.0	1,355,612	28.2	26.4	10.0	8.2	7.7	5.9	5.6	4.3	2.6	1.1
Source: val.se
