= Vällingby =

Suburban district in Stockholm, Sweden

- District
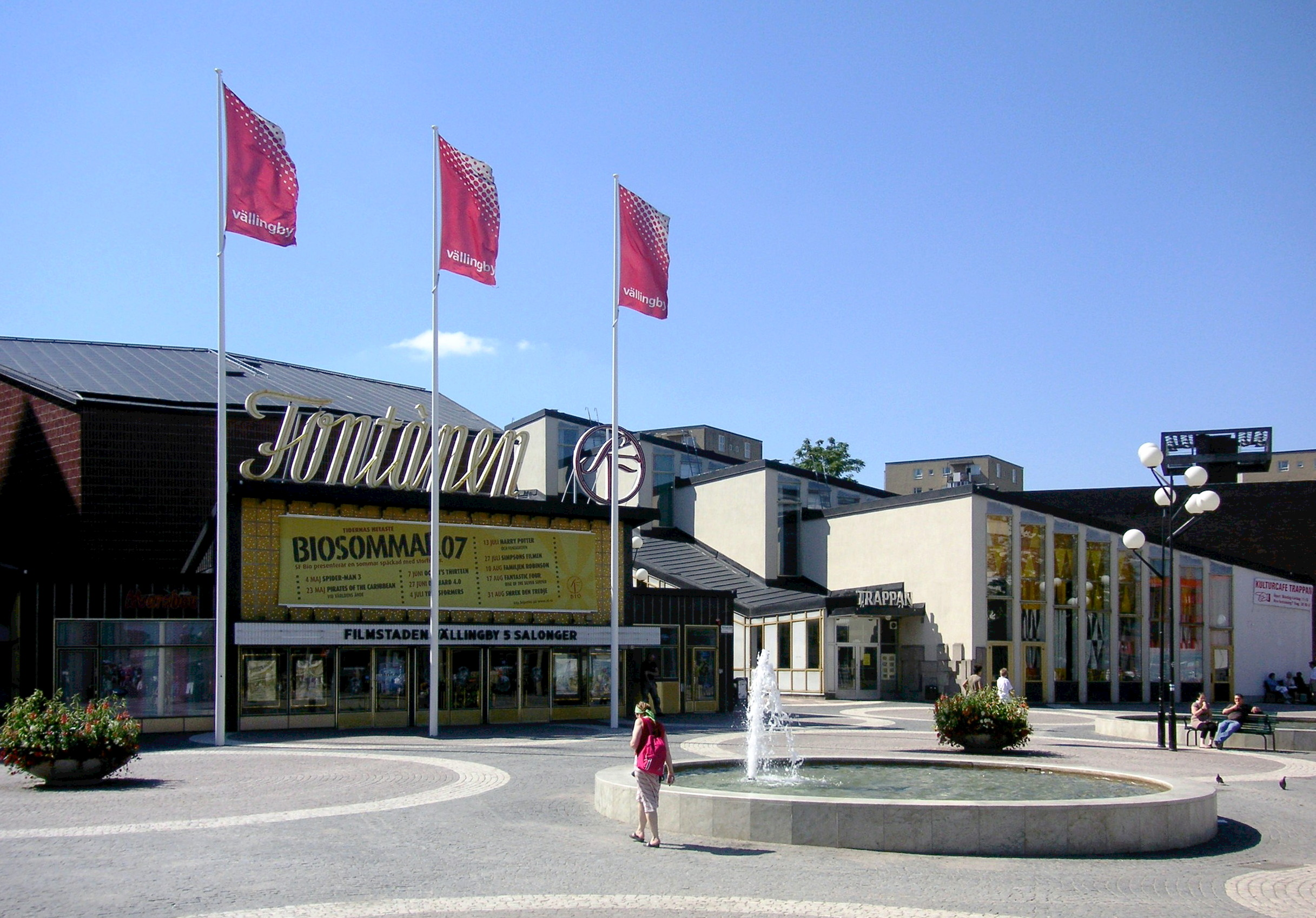
- Vällingby Torg

- Location in Stockholm Municipality
- Coordinates: 59°22′02″N 17°52′10″E
- Country: Sweden
- Landsdel: Svealand
- Province: Uppland
- County: Stockholm County
- Municipality: Stockholm Municipality
- Borough: Hässelby-Vällingby
- Inaugurated: 1954

Area
  - Total: 1.37 km^{2} (0.53 sq mi)

Population (2022-12-31)
  - Total: 37,778
  - Density: 27,600/km^{2} (71,400/sq mi)
- Time zone: UTC+1 (CET)
  - Summer (DST): UTC+2 (CEST)
- Postal code: 162 00 – 162 88

Vällingby (Swedish pronunciation: [ˈvɛ̂lːɪŋˌbyː]) is a suburban district in Västerort, the western part of Stockholm Municipality, Sweden. It is notable for being one of the first modern planned suburbs in Sweden. Vällingby was inaugurated in 1954 as part of Stockholm's post-war decentralisation plans. The area is centred around Vällingby Centrum, one of Sweden’s first shopping centers.

== History ==
=== Early history ===
The agricultural land where the modern suburb now stands has a history stretching back over 2,000 years, at least twice as old as Stockholm. The people who lived there were known as vaellingar, "those living on the embankment". While it first appears in historical records in 1347 and it is known that two farmyards existed here during the reign of King Gustav Vasa in the 16th century, in the 1922 edition of Nordisk Familjebok the location was still regarded as too insignificant to deserve an article. In 1953 the number of inhabitants barely exceeded 2,000.

=== Post-war development ===
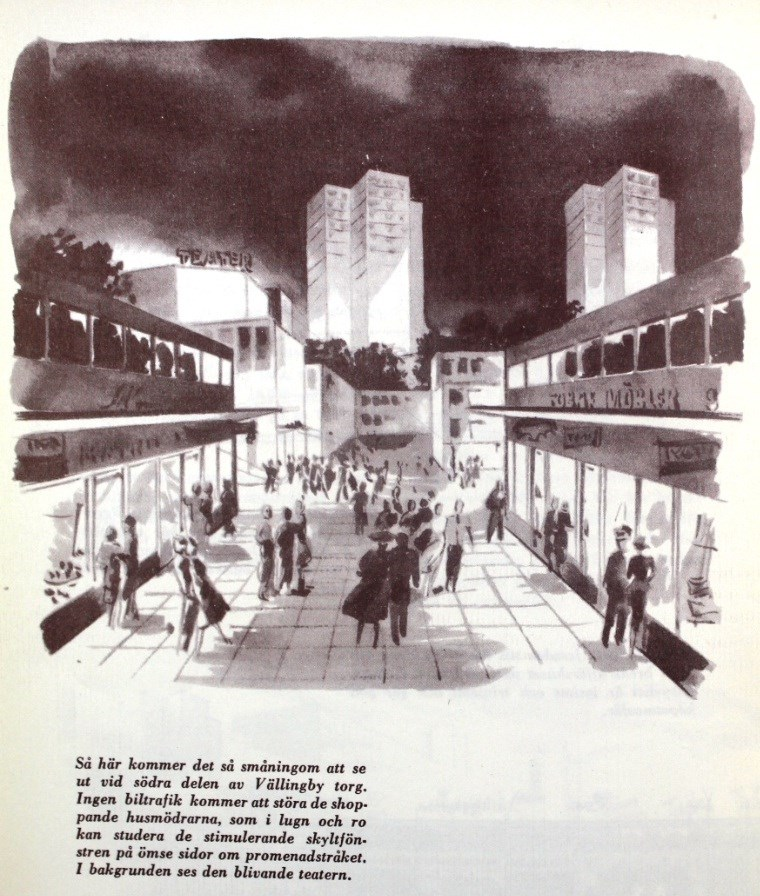
Illustration from a 1952 brochure for Vällingby Centrum

As part of a wider plan to decentralise the population of Stockholm, this rural land was quickly transformed into the present modern suburb. Planning began in 1949, and in 1951, Svenska Bostäder, a municipal housing company, was tasked with developing Vällingby Centrum, the commercial centre, and parts of its residential areas.

The centre included a pedestrian-friendly design, with traffic and goods distribution routed underground. The first residents moved in by summer 1952. Vällingby was designed from the outset to connect to central Stockholm via the planned metro system, with Vällingby metro station which opened on 26 October 1952. Vällingby was inaugurated on November 14, 1954, by Prime Minister Tage Erlander, in a ceremony attracting nearly 100,000 people.

Vällingby was the first ABC City (ABC-stad) — an acronym for Arbete – Bostad – Centrum, "Labour – Housing – Centre"—a suburb that acted almost like a city, designed to offer its residents everything they needed. High above the modern structure, a rotating V-symbol placed the project on the map, while the shining T-symbol (for tunnelbana, metro) proudly indicated the presence of the newly built Stockholm Metro. Shortly after the inauguration of the modern suburb, the number of inhabitants had reached 25,000.

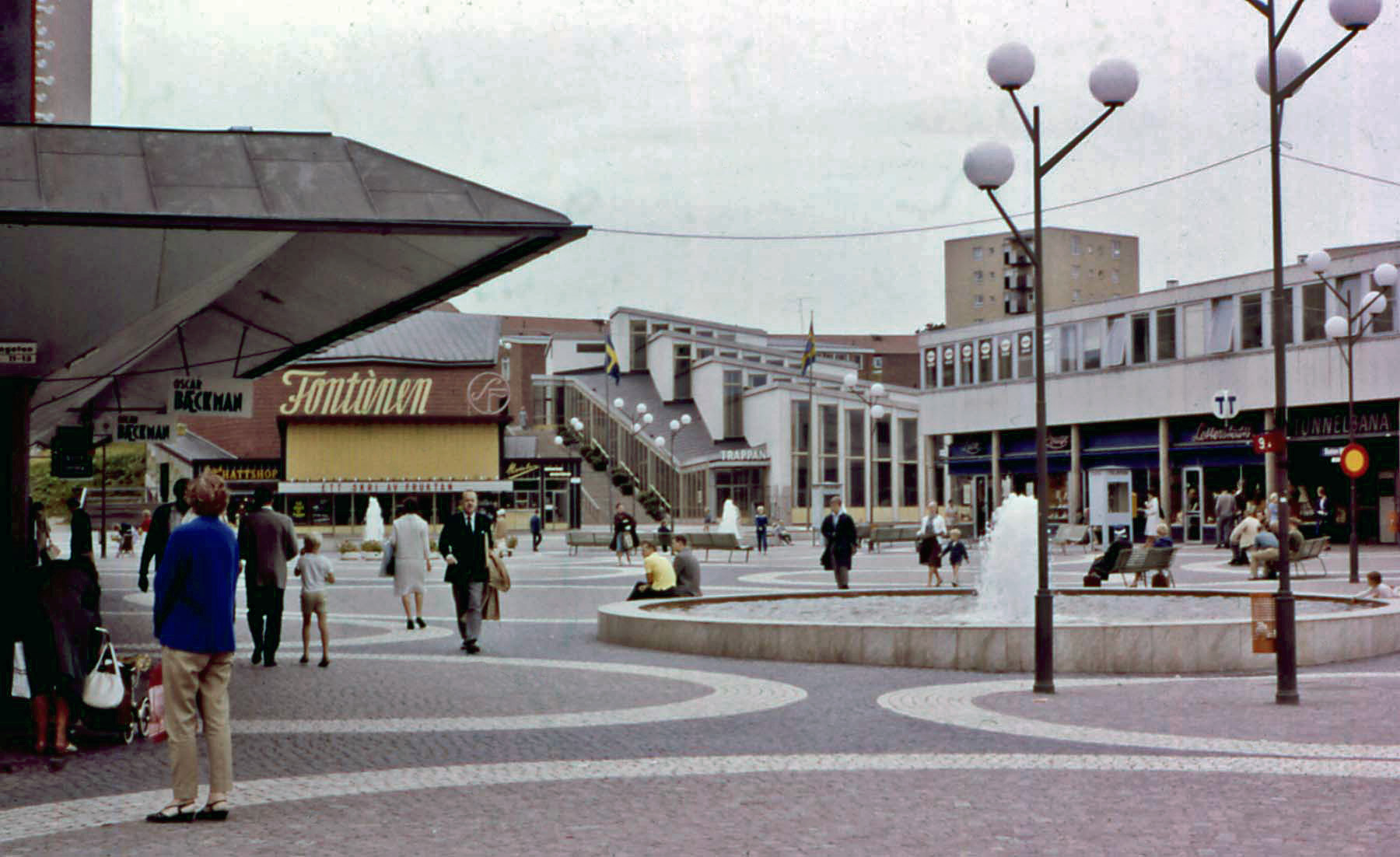
Central Vallingby in 1961

The new suburb was the fruit of plans to develop the rural areas surrounding Stockholm dating back to the early 20th century. As a direct consequence of real-estate speculations around the turn of the 20th century, centralised municipal city planning was widely accepted as a necessary tool to solve the acute housing shortage and the City of Stockholm bought large areas for the purpose. During the decades preceding the construction of Vällingby, a series of small-scale suburbs had been realised; some more or less exclusive—such as the egnahemsområden ("own-your-own-home areas") at Stocksund and Saltsjöbaden built around 1900; or in the style of the Garden city movement, like in Bromma and Enskede built between the wars; and low blocks of apartments built during the 1940s, like in Traneberg and Abrahamsberg. However, many of these suburbs had turned into dormitory suburbs, a problem thought to be avoided in Vällingby by planning for approximately 10,000 work places for the 20–25,000 inhabitants, while the metro was to provide commercial centre access for some 80,000 people.

=== Recent changes ===
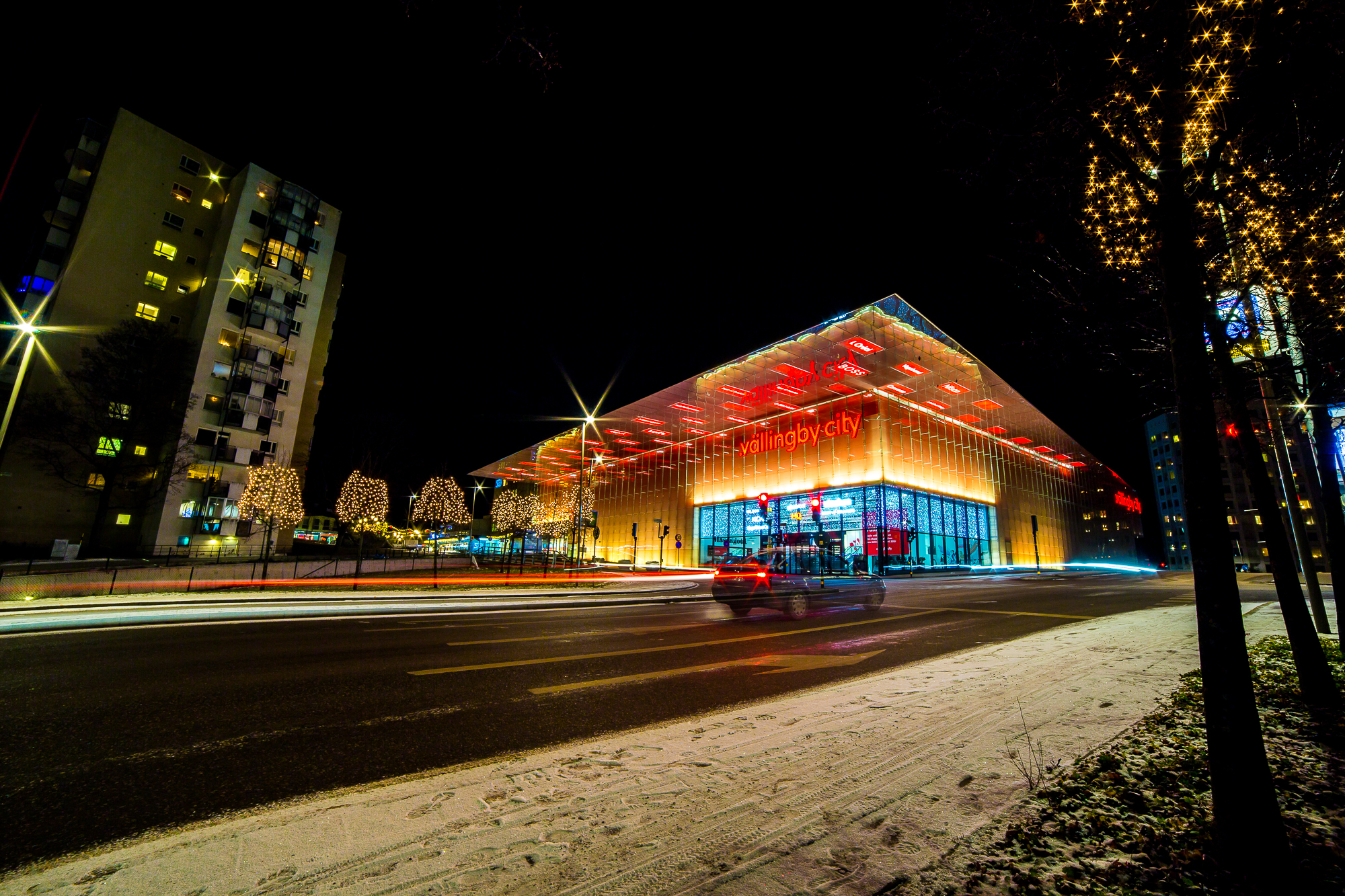
Vällingby Centrum branded as Vällingby City in 2014

Vällingby Centrum was modernized in 2004–2008. One of the new buildings, K-fem, was designed by architect Gert Wingårdh. It was named the World's Best Building for Shopping at the World Architecture Festival in Barcelona in 2008, and received the Swedish Light Prize in 2008 and the Nordic Light Prize in 2010.

Vällingby Centrum shopping centre was renamed to Vällingby City, but the name change was never made official. In 2017, the original name Vällingby Centrum was returned, while the centre received a new graphic identity to reflect the centre's 1950s heritage.

In April 2022, Stockholm Municipality and Svenska Bostäder sold Vällingby Centrum to the real estate company Nrep for 1.68 billion SEK (approx €158 million). The sale did not include cultural institutions such as the cinema, Kulturhuset Trappan, library, and the metro station.

== Urban planning ==
The original plan for the area was designed by architect Sven Markelius (1889–1972) city planning director in Stockholm, who placed high-rise buildings near the metro stations with peripheral self-contained houses and green areas around it. While the Social Democrats are widely acknowledged for the realisation of Vällingby, other political parties and, not the least, private entrepreneurs actively took part in the planning process. In 1955, the master plan drawn up by Sven Markelius for Farsta in Söderort was also adopted.

The ABC City failed to work as intended as most people found work elsewhere. Nevertheless, Vällingby remains one of the most popular suburbs of Stockholm with a cultural significance unsurpassed by later suburbs built as part of the so-called Million Programme during the 1960s and 1970s, such as Skärholmen and Tensta, where less efforts were spent on cultural and social infrastructure.

== Notable residents ==
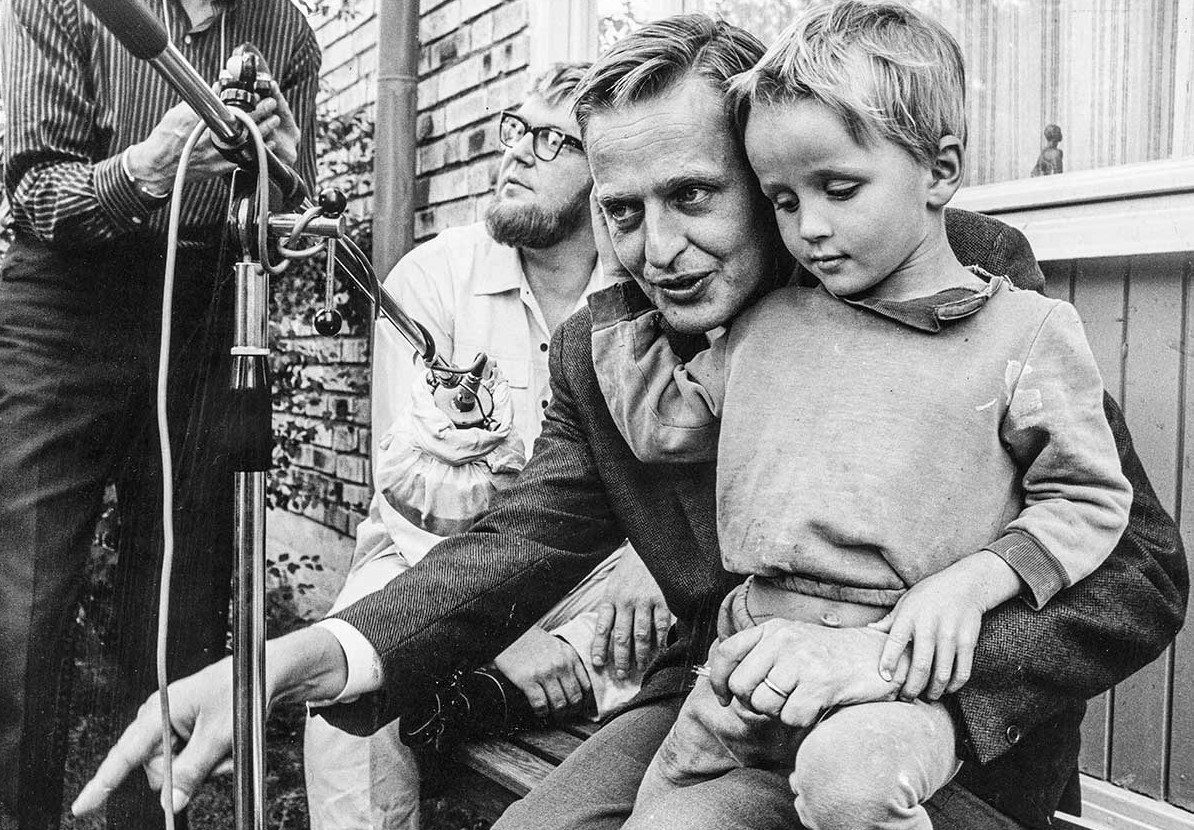
- Olof Palme at his townhouse at Lövångersgatan 31 in Vällingby
  Olof Palme - Prime Minister of Sweden 1969 to 1976 and 1982 to 1986.
- Toomas Hendrik Ilves - President of Estonia 2006 to 2016.
- John Ausonius - the Laser Man killer.
- Benny Andersson - composer, pianist and ABBA-member.
- Darin (singer).
- Kenta (musician).
- Quorthon - musician of the black metal band Bathory.
- Bill Skarsgård - actor born August 9, 1990.
- Alexander Skarsgård - actor from HBO TV series True Blood and Big Little Lies.
- Dejan Kulusevski - Tottenham Hotspur football player.

== See also ==
- Hässelby-Vällingby
- Vinstagårdsskolan

== Sources ==
- David Pass (1969) Vällingby and Farsta--from idea to reality: The suburban development process in a large Swedish city (Statens institut for byggnadsförskning)
