= Abrahamsberg =

Urban district in Stockholm, Sweden

Coordinates: 59.333121°N 17.947911°E

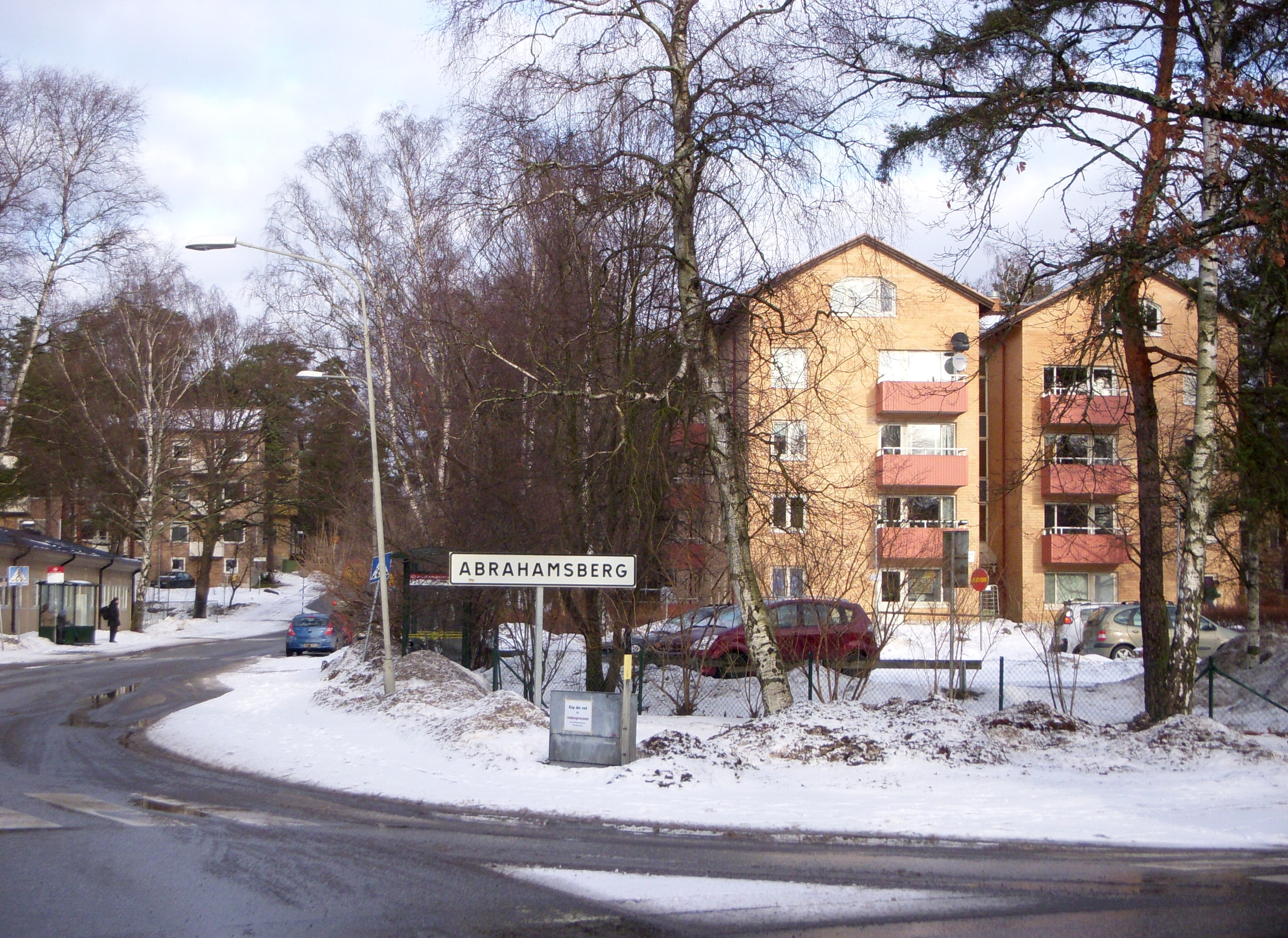
Abrahamsberg

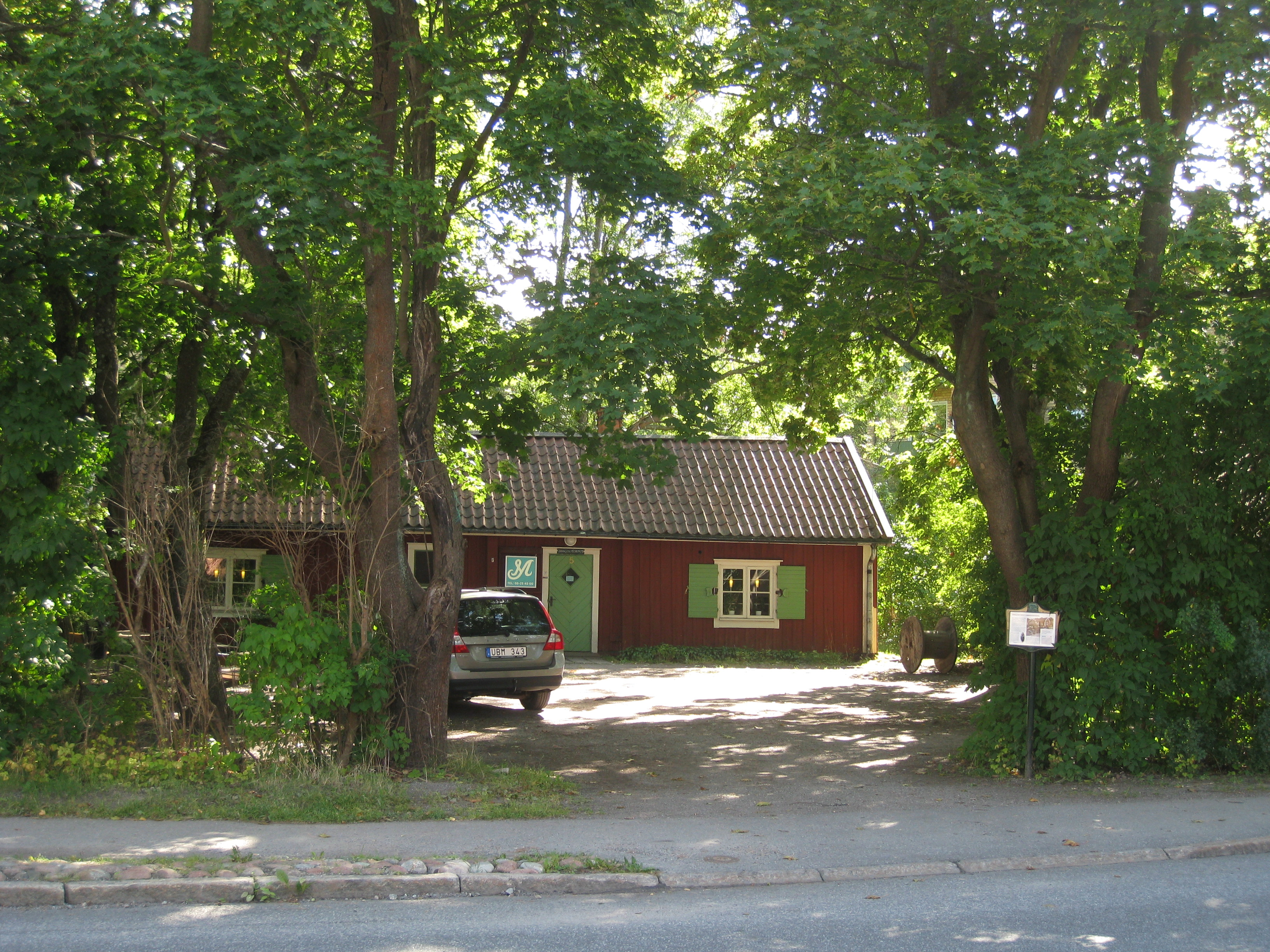
The "dragoon's cottage" whose mid-19th century resident gave his name to the district

Abrahamsberg is a residential district in the Västerort section of Stockholm Municipality, Sweden, and part of the Bromma borough. It is bordered by Riksby, Stora Mossen, Ålsten, Olovslund and Åkeslund and is served by the Abrahamsberg metro station. The district was developed with small blocks of flats in yellow brick, and is therefore sometimes called den gula staden (the yellow city). As of December 2013 it had 3,154 residents.

== History ==
Abrahamsberg was originally part of the Ulvsunda estate. It takes its name from Gustaf Abraham Pihl (born 1829), who moved in the mid-19th century into the so-called "dragoon's cottage", which was probably built in the early 18th century and is now one of the last remaining soldiers' cottages in the area, and his son, Abraham Pihl the younger; in 1889 Pihl built a brick house nearby, in which his son lived after him, and this house came to be known as Abrahamsberg and gave its name to the settlement.

The City of Stockholm acquired the land, together with Åkeslund, in autumn 1904, but only in 1937 was a development plan prepared, by the then director of city planning, Albert Lilienberg. Between then and 1945 it was developed with three-storey blocks of flats in a parklike setting. They were built in yellow brick, while in Åkeslund red brick was used, so that Abrahamsberg is sometimes called den gula staden (the yellow city).

Initially there was little interest in the new suburb because of its remoteness. However, in 1944 a tram line, Ängbybanan, reached the area. In 1952 this was replaced by the underground with the opening of Abrahamsberg metro station. Around 1990 some larger blocks of flats were built, and in 1999 the station was replaced by the current station, which is actually in Riksby.

== Buildings ==
Abrahamsberg School was designed by Paul Hedqvist and was originally built in 1946; an annexe was built in 1963. Both buildings are in yellow brick. The school has approximately 800 pupils in years pre-school to 9.

Abrahamsberg Church was designed by Bengt Romare. It was dedicated in 1955 and renovated in 1990.
