= Västerort =

Coordinates: 59°21′23″N 17°54′46″E

Stockholm Municipality's boroughs: Västerort covers the western third. The map also shows Stockholm City Centre's and Söderort's boroughs.

Västerort (sometimes translated to West Stockholm) is the western part of Stockholm Municipality in Stockholm County, Sweden. It also forms part of Stockholm urban area and of Stockholm Metropolitan Area. It constitutes the western suburban area within Stockholm's municipal borders.

The eastern part of Västerort was incorporated by the City of Stockholm in 1916 and the western part in 1949.

Since 2007, Västerort is organized into four stadsdelsområden (sometimes translated to boroughs): Bromma, Hässelby-Vällingby, Rinkeby-Kista, and Spånga-Tensta.

Before 2007, it was organized into five boroughs: Bromma borough, Hässelby-Vällingby borough, Kista borough, Rinkeby borough and Spånga-Tensta borough.

== Districts ==
District	Area¹	Population (31-12-2007)	Density²	Pre-2007 borough	Borough
Abrahamsberg	42	2,740	65	Bromma	Bromma
Akalla + Hansta	673	8,153	12	Kista	Rinkeby-Kista
Alvik	52	1017	20	Bromma	Bromma
Beckomberga	82	2,749	33	Bromma	Bromma
Blackeberg	155	6,666	44	Bromma	Bromma
Bromma kyrka	112	2,595	23	Bromma	Bromma
Bromsten	219	5,712	26	Spånga-Tensta	Spånga-Tensta
Bällsta	133	850	6	Bromma	Bromma
Eneby	34	793	23	Bromma	Bromma
Flysta	79	2,178	28	Spånga-Tensta	Spånga-Tensta
Grimsta	266	4,146	16	Hässelby-Vällingby	Hässelby-Vällingby
Husby	185	11,551	63	Kista	Rinkeby-Kista
Hässelby Gård	134	9,494	71	Hässelby-Vällingby	Hässelby-Vällingby
Hässelby Strand	94	6,566	70	Hässelby-Vällingby	Hässelby-Vällingby
Hässelby Villastad	763	17,329	23	Hässelby-Vällingby	Hässelby-Vällingby
Höglandet	44	1,417	32	Bromma	Bromma
Kista	413	10,477	25	Kista	Rinkeby-Kista
Kälvesta	117	4,458	38	Hässelby-Vällingby	Hässelby-Vällingby
Lunda	136	13	0	Spånga-Tensta	Spånga-Tensta
Mariehäll	72	1,972	27	Bromma	Bromma
Nockeby	95	3,143	33	Bromma	Bromma
Nockebyhov	159	2,629	17	Bromma	Bromma
Norra Ängby	203	5,110	25	Bromma	Bromma
Nälsta	138	4,633	34	Hässelby-Vällingby	Hässelby-Vällingby
Olovslund	26	556	21	Bromma	Bromma
Riksby	370	3,555	10	Bromma	Bromma
Rinkeby	131	15,051	115	Rinkeby	Rinkeby-Kista
Råcksta	142	4,733	33	Hässelby-Vällingby	Hässelby-Vällingby
Smedslätten	110	2,427	22	Bromma	Bromma
Solhem	311	8,379	27	Spånga-Tensta	Spånga-Tensta
Stora Mossen	65	1,615	25	Bromma	Bromma
Sundby	117	1,965	17	Spånga-Tensta	Spånga-Tensta
Södra Ängby	112	1,744	16	Bromma	Bromma
Tensta	200	17,083	85	Spånga-Tensta	Spånga-Tensta
Traneberg	86	6,884	80	Bromma	Bromma
Ulvsunda	85	2,113	25	Bromma	Bromma
Ulvsunda industriområde	135	2,550	19	Bromma	Bromma
Vinsta	167	3,228	19	Hässelby-Vällingby	Hässelby-Vällingby
Vällingby	137	7,071	52	Hässelby-Vällingby	Hässelby-Vällingby
Åkeshov	28	687	25	Bromma	Bromma
Åkeslund	51	3,068	60	Bromma	Bromma
Ålsten	133	3,380	25	Bromma	Bromma
Äppelviken	77	1,884	24	Bromma	Bromma
Total	6884	205,453	30		

1/ hectares
2/ Population per hectare

== See also ==
- Stockholm City Centre
- Söderort
