= Ulvsunda =

Urban district in Stockholm, Sweden

Coordinates: 59°20′17″N 17°57′56″E

Ulvsunda is a district in Bromma in western Stockholm, just east of Stockholm Bromma Airport, built around Ulvsunda Castle, a 17th-century castle. Ulvsunda borders the ulvsunda industrial area to the north, Lake Ulvsunda and Traneberg to the east, Alvik and Stora Mossen to the south, and Riksby to the west. The southeastern part of Lillsjön is part of Ulvsunda and straight through the district stretches Ulvsundavägen.

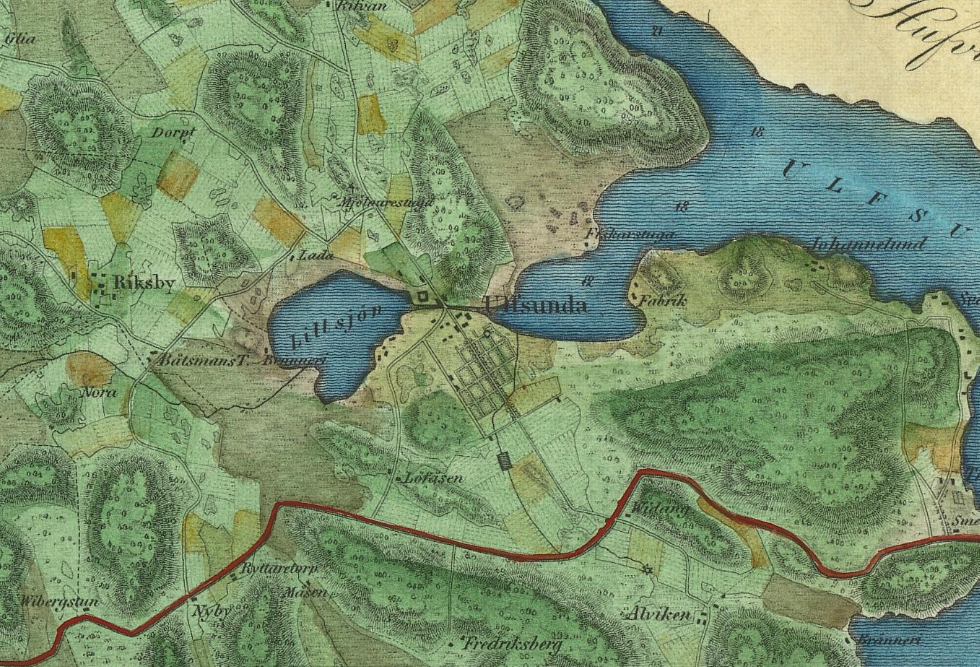
Map of Ulvsunda, 1829

The borough of Ulvsunda was formed in 1932 after the area changed its name from "Kungsholms villastad" to "Ulvsunda trädgårdsstad" a few years prior.

== History ==
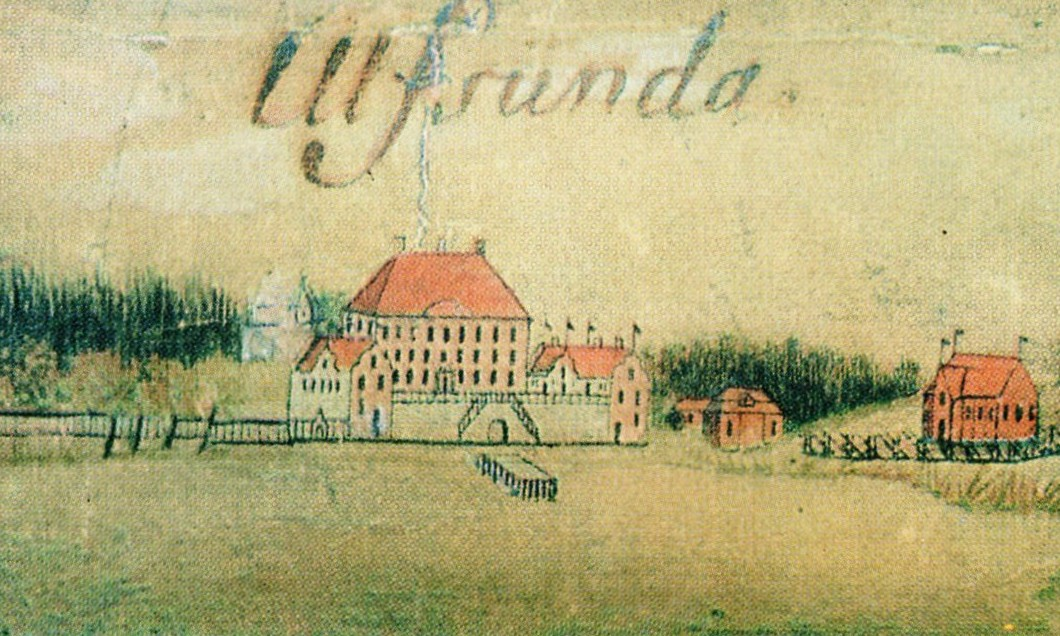
Mälarkartan Ulvsunda, 1689

Ulvsunda is one of the earliest attested place names in Stockholm. The name has its origin in Ulv which means wolf. On a runestone from the 1000s, found in Riksby ägor, one could previously read that the stone was erected in memory of the farmer Björn as byki : ulsunti i.e. byggi in Ulvsundi/lived in Ulvsund. Ulvsund was originally the name of the narrow outlet from Lillsjön to the present Ulvsundasjön. The farm Ulvsunda is known to be in existence since the 14th century (in Vlphsunde, 1347). In the 17th century, spellings of the name occur as Ållsunde (1617), and Åhlsunde (1682).

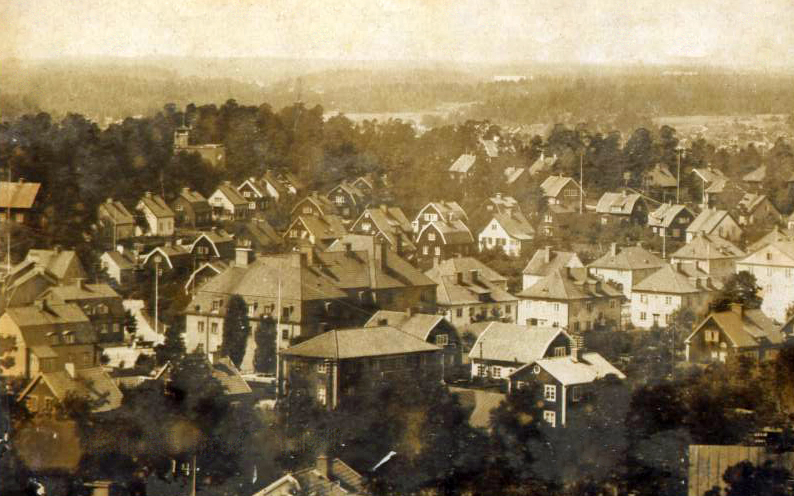
Kungsholmens village, 1969

Ulvsunda castle was erected in 1644-1645 by Field Marshal, count Lennart Torstenson. The current appearance of the building dates from the 1830s. Among the former owners after Lennart Torstenson and his son Anders Torstenson and grandson Carl Ulrik Torstenson are; Count Ture Gabriel Bielke, baron Fredrik Preis, the industrialist, count Eric Ruuth, the mill patron Johan Henrik Wegelin and the wholesaler Lorens Jacob Groth. Later owners of the castle include the Major General, count Gustaf Adolf Fredrik Wilhelm von Essen and the family Åkerhielm af Margrethelund with the owners baron Gustaf Fredrik Åkerhielm and son Gustaf Samuel Åkerhielm. Baron Gustaf Åkerhielm became the last Noble owner of Ulvsunda. He died in 1900, and the castle stood unoccupied for a few years thereafter. The castle and its garden were bought by the Stockholm County Council, which for a long time used it as a nursing home. The castle is now used for courses.

Kungsholms Residential District

The beginnings of today's district grew out of the construction of Sommarnöjen on the Lillsjönäs estate during the 1800s. Between 1902 and 1903, villa plots were detached from Ulvsunda Castle's land and sold by the castle's then owner, Max Wibom.

In 1906, he joined forces with Per August Kindgren, a former horse tram driver and the former owner of Lillsjönäs farm. Together, they created the company "AB Kungsholms Villastad" for the purpose of selling plots for private homes. The company sold lots separated from Lillsjönäs until 1908. The informal designation for the area was kungsholms villastad until 1926, when it was given the official name Ulvsunda. The houses in the villa town were partly rental villas with a simple standard and were partly their own homes. The houses were detailed with glass porches and towers. However, the Land Company did not build roads or sewers and the sanitary conditions were very poor.

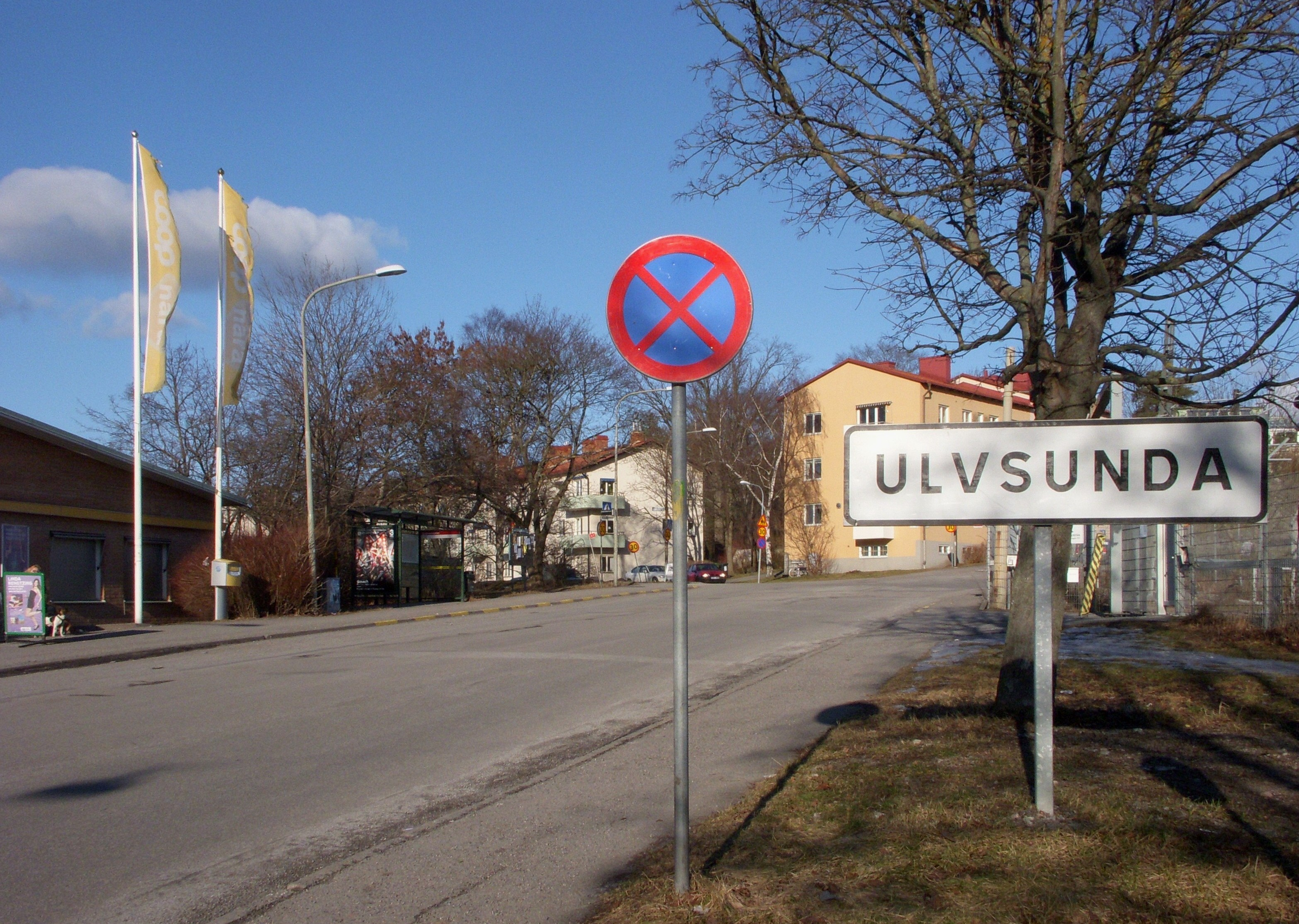
Ulvsunda sign, 2012

The city of Stockholm takes over

The city of Stockholm acquired the majority of the Bromma property in 1904. The purchase was known as "the large land property purchase of Bromma". In 1908, the property Lillsjönäs was also bought by the city and parts of the wild so-called "kungsholms villastad" were demolished. Instead, in 1912 "ulvsunda trädgårdsstad" was planned, city engineer August Emanuel Påhlman was responsible and later city plans were drawn up by, among others, Per Olof Hallman and Albert Lilienberg. Today's road network dates from that time.

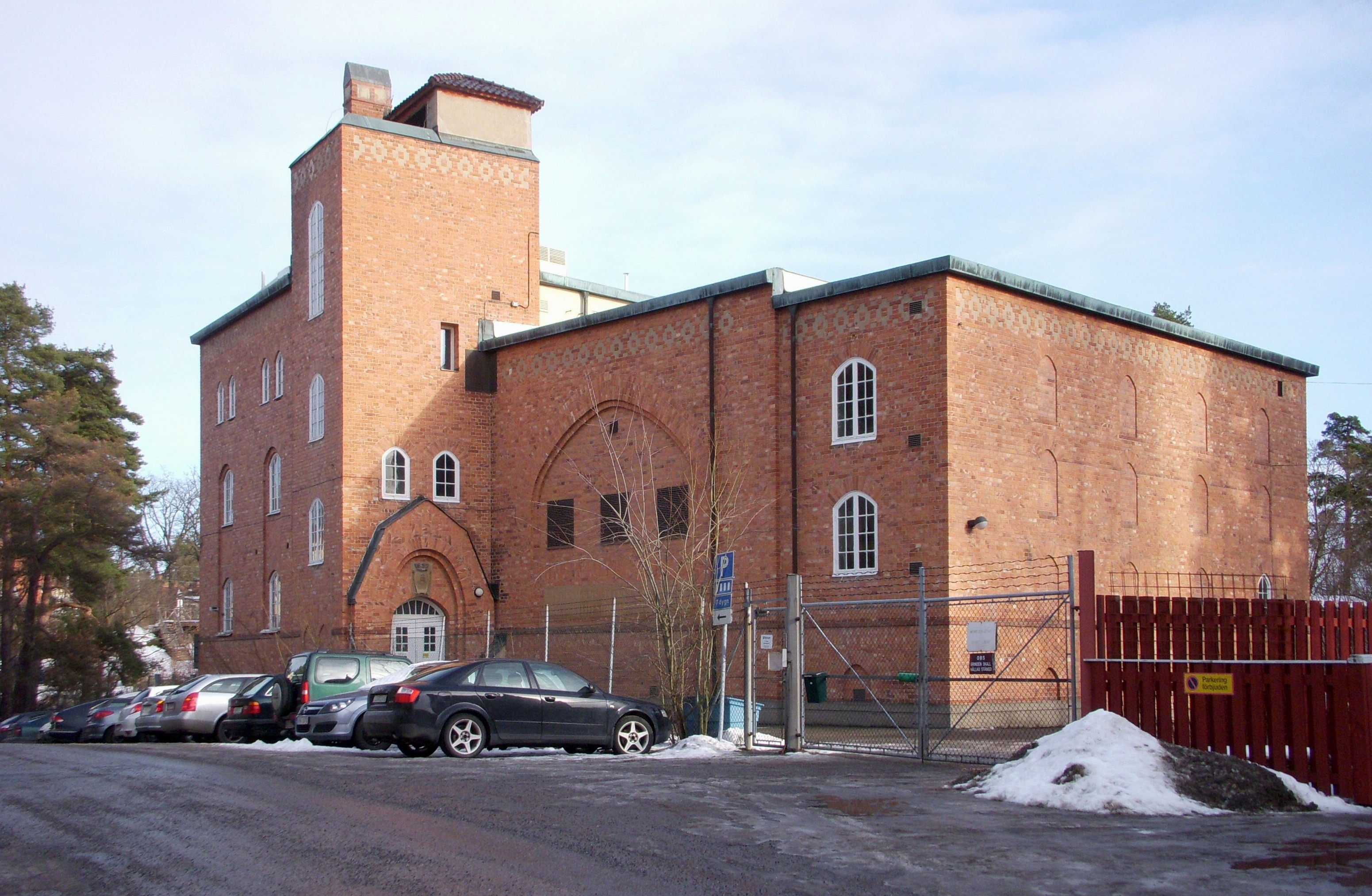
Lillsjöstationen, 2012

In order to make the new garden city more attractive, the city also started some building projects of a public nature under its own direction. In 1919, among other things, the Ulvsunda fire and police station (closed in 1976) was added at Ulvsundavägen as well as a parsonage and some service housing for tramway workers

In 1914, tram line number 13 (Ulvsundabanan), a branch of the so-called Brommabanan, was pulled out to Ulvsunda via the pontoon bridge over Tranebergssund (later Traneberg Bridge). The stops were "Ulvsundavägen", "Prästgården" and "Ulvsunda" with the terminus at Lillsjöplan, where a tram stop was built. At the same time, electricity was drawn to the area and a substation (Lillsjö station with associated residential buildings) was built at lövåsvägen according to designs by architect Gustaf de Frumerie. The leasing of the allotments, however, was slow at first, but the pace increased after the first World War.

Bebyggelse Between 1916 and 1917, the city of Stockholm had the B built in the bergsryggen neighborhood on the southwest side of Ulvsundavägen. Originally planned as makeshift emergency housing, the house is one of the few surviving buildings of this type in Stockholm. In the 1920s, most of the own homes in Garden City were added, usually by contract by the future owner. There was also speculative construction, where private entrepreneurs built houses for further sale. Among the architects are Gustaf Pettersson, Gustaf Larson and Edvin Engström, all of whom were associated with the city's Egnahemsbyrån. In the 1920s and 1930s, expansion of private homes on plots with vacant lots continued, but in the 1940s the proportion of apartment buildings that later completely took over increased. This contributed to a very diverse but at the same time cohesive settlement in Ulvsunda.

Street names related to Field Marshal Lennart Torstenson Some streets within Ulvsunda are named after Field Marshal Lennart Torstenson, who built Ulvsunda Castle and was the owner of the estate in 1644-1645, when the castle was built. Some examples of roads in Ulvsunda district related to Torstenson and his estate are Fältmarskalkens Väg (1924), Forstenavägen (1924), Hamrabacken (1930) and Restadsvägen (1924). Later owners of Ulvsunda castle include the families Bielke and Åkerhielm and in 1924 Bielkevägen was also named after the Riksråd count Ture Gabriel Bielke and his son Hovmannen and Riksråd, count Nils Adam Bielke and Åkerhielmsgatan after the military, friherre Gustaf Fredrik Åkerhielm and his son, prime minister, friherre Gustaf Åkerhielm.

ltmarskalkens väg/Fältmarskalksvägen was named after Field Marshal Lennart Torstenson, previously the road was called Lövåsvägen, named after a village under Ulvsunda, and first had been called Boställsvägen, after the new priest's residence, which was Bromma prästgård, Ulvsunda prästgård, and today is located on Lövåsvägen 12. The House Ulvsunda prästgård is located at the intersection Ulvsunda Slottsväg-Lövåsvägen. The vicarage in Ulvsunda was newly built in 1914 and was located south of Ulvsunda Castle, between Ulvsunda Castle Park and the green area around Lake Lillsjön.

Forstenavägen was named after Forstena Manor in the Western Tunhems parish at the foot of Hunneberg in the present Vänersborg municipality in Västergötland, and there Lennart Torstenson was born 17 August 1603. Since the Middle Ages, Forstena was the seat of the Torstenson family, whose previous family line was called Forstenaätten.

Hamrabacken. In the 1630s Lennart Torstenson owned two nearby farms in Stockholms-Näs parish at Görvälnsfjärden by Lake Mälaren in Uppland. The two farms were Hamra (Hambra) and Källvik. Hambra and Källvik were Crown Estates, which in 1573 was exchanged for frälsesäteri by Erik XIV's field Colonel Anders Rålamb. Anders Sigfridsson, (1527-1581), was a royal official in the second half of the 16th century and the ancestor of the noble family Rålamb. Anders made a rapid career in the service of Erik XIV and is mentioned in 1561 as a member of Erik XIV's nämnd. During the campaign against Duke John in 1563, Anders was appointed governor of Finland and, on 30 December of the same year, Governor of all of Norrland, a position he held as late as 1568. During the Nordic Seven Years' War, he was also appointed as Colonel Arklimästare and fabric master. These two farms, Hamra and Källvik, were merged in the 1690s by his son Anders Torstenson into an estate under the name Lennartsnäs and then belonged to his descendants until 1758. In 1930, Hamrabacken in Ulvsunda was named after the farm Hamra in Stockholms-Näs Parish.

== Demographics ==
As of 31 December 2021, the ward has a population of 2,753, of whom 22.6 per cent are from a foreign background.

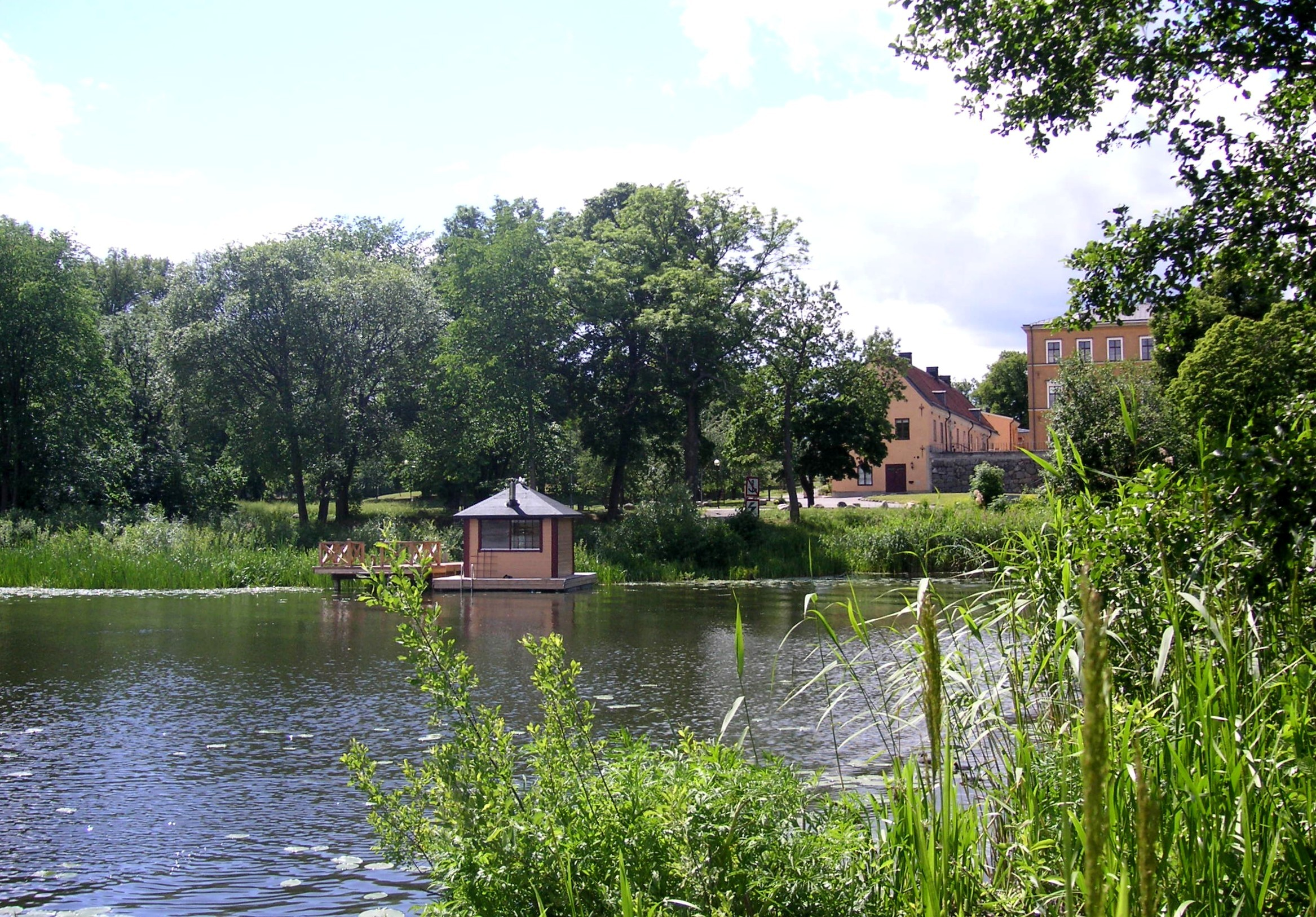

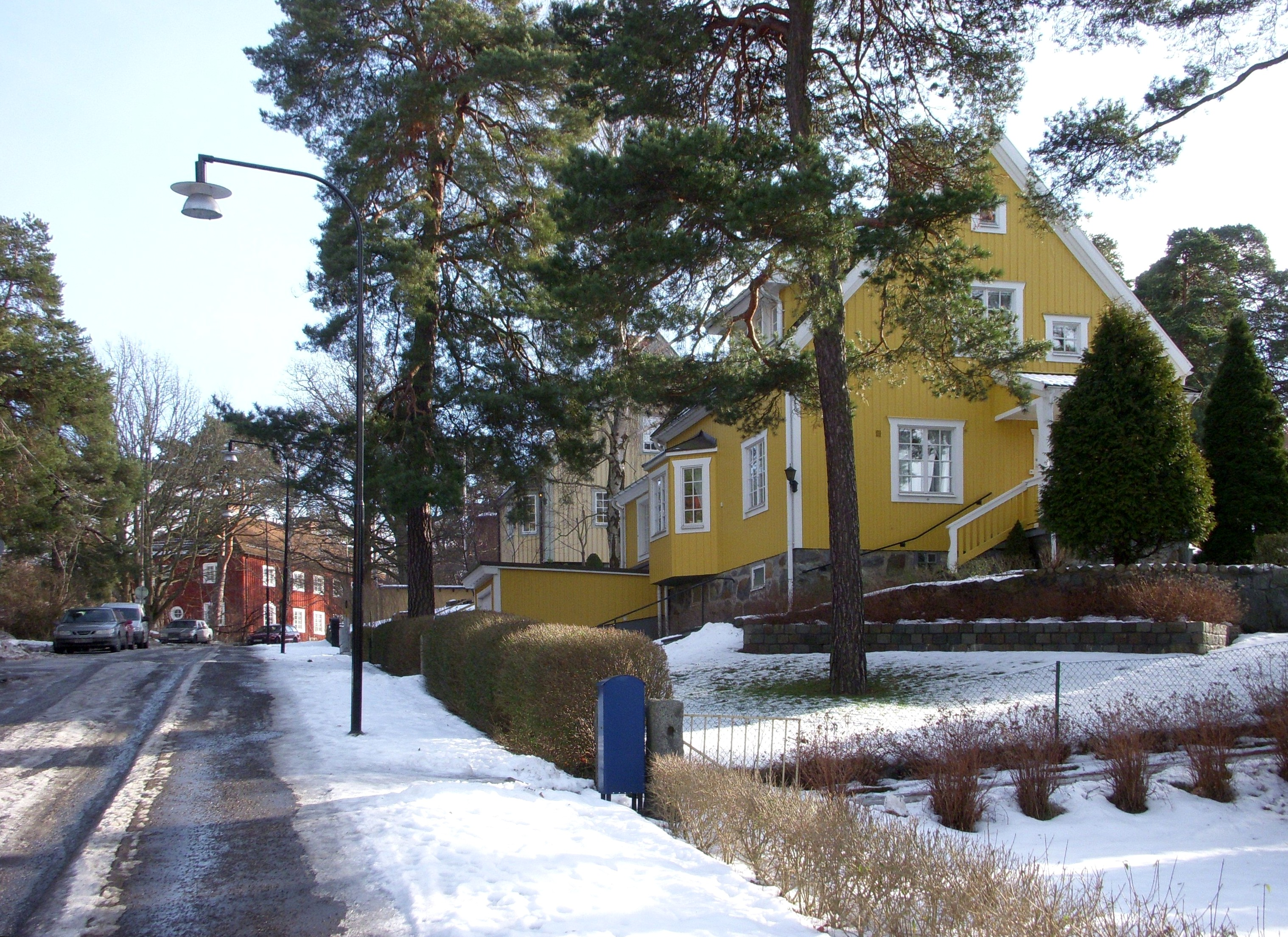
Ulnda Garden City (Fältmarskalksvägen)

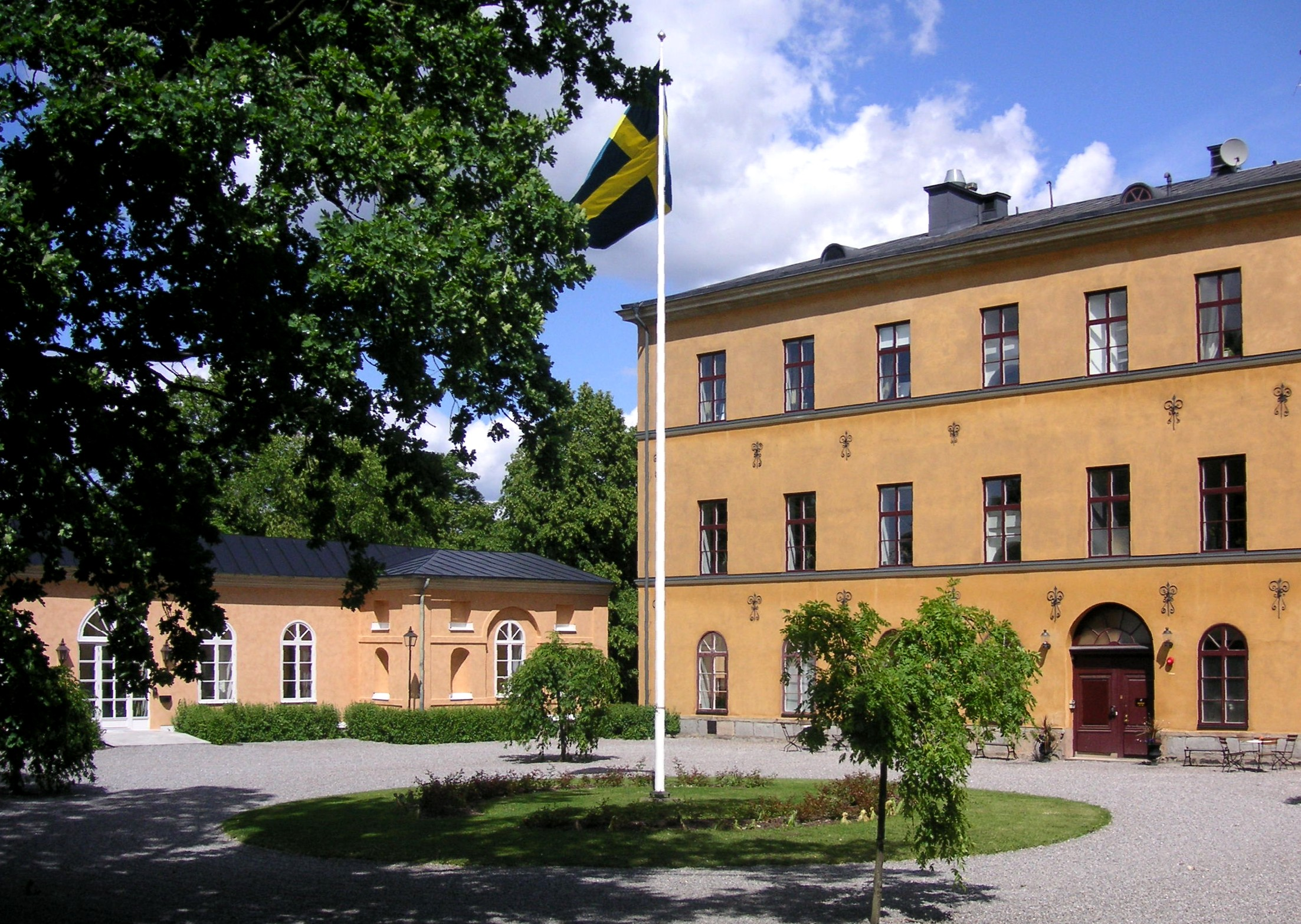
Ulvsunda Castle
