= Bromma =

Borough of Stockholm, Sweden

- Borough of Stockholm
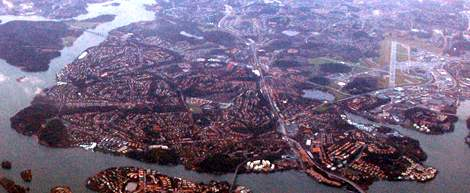
- Bromma

- Location of Bromma shown in yellow
- Coordinates: 59°20′20″N 17°56′20″E
- Country: Sweden
- Municipality: Stockholm Municipality
- Municipality subdivision: Västerort
- Established: 1997

Government
  - Type: Municipal assembly
  - Municipal commissioner: Jan Tigerström (M)

Area
  - Total: 25.99 km^{2} (10.03 sq mi)

Population (2014)
  - Total: 72,000
  - Density: 2,800/km^{2} (7,200/sq mi)
- Time zone: UTC+1 (CET)
  - Summer (DST): UTC+2 (CEST)
- Postal code: 161 --, 167 --, 168 --
- Area code: 08
- Website: Stockholm.se

Bromma (Swedish pronunciation: [ˈbrɔ̂mːa]) is a borough (stadsdelsområde) in the western part of Stockholm, Sweden, forming part of the Stockholm Municipality. Bromma is primarily made up of Bromma Parish and Västerled Parish. The third largest airport in Sweden and the third largest of the airports close to Stockholm, the Stockholm Bromma Airport, was first built in Bromma in 1936. The south-eastern part of Bromma is one of the richest areas in Stockholm.

== Description ==
The districts that make up the borough are Abrahamsberg, Alvik, Beckomberga, Blackeberg, Bromma kyrka, Bällsta, Eneby, Höglandet, Mariehäll, Nockeby, Nockebyhov, Norra Ängby, Olovslund, Riksby, Smedslätten, Stora Mossen, Södra Ängby, Traneberg, Ulvsunda, Ulvsunda Industriområde, Åkeshov, Åkeslund, Ålsten and Äppelviken. As of 2004, the population is 59,229 in an area of 24.60 km^{2}, which gives a density of 2,407.68/km^{2}.

Bromma is dotted with tiny forests, parks and lakes, including Judarskogen nature reserve, surrounding Lake Judarn, and the parks around Åkeshov Castle and Ulvsunda Castle. Bromma Church is one of the most distinguished Romanesque churches in the region, celebrated for a complete scheme of wallpaintings by the late medieval artist Albertus Pictor (c. 1440 - c. 1507).

Bromma consists predominantly of high-and medium-income residential neighbourhoods, and the Ulvsunda industrial area. This is situated close to Stockholm-Bromma Airport, the only airport in the city of Stockholm. It was opened in 1936 and serves primarily domestic destinations; with about 1.25 million passengers a year, it is the 2nd largest airport in Stockholm County. Ängby Camping is one of the largest camping lots in Stockholm and is situated close to a large beach by Lake Mälaren.

== Subdivision ==
District	Area (km^{2})	Population (2004)	Density (unh./km^{2})
Abrahamsberg	0.42	2,761	6,573.81
Alvik	0.52	990	1,903.85
Beckomberga	0.82	2,578	3,143.90
Blackeberg	1.57	5,921	3,771.34
Bromma kyrka	1.11	2,430	2,189.19
Bällsta	1.33	801	602.26
Eneby	0.34	782	2,300.00
Höglandet	0.44	1,345	3,056.82
Lunda	1.32	7	5.30
Mariehäll	0.73	1,368	1,873.97
Nockeby	0.98	3,032	3,093.88
Nockebyhov	1.64	2,600	1,585.37
Norra Ängby	2.00	4,926	2,463.00
Olovslund	0.27	543	2,011.11
Riksby	3.73	3,566	956.03
Smedslätten	1.03	2,372	2,302.91
Stora Mossen	0.64	1,352	2,112.50
Södra Ängby	1.09	1,722	1,579.82
Traneberg	0.91	6,793	7,464.84
Ulvsunda	0.82	2,063	2,515.85
Ulvsunda Industriområde	1.38	2,513	1,821.01
Åkeshov	0.27	681	2,522.22
Åkeslund	0.51	2,907	5,700.00
Ålsten	1.35	3,262	2,416.30
Äppelviken	0.77	1,799	2,336.36
Total	25.99	59,114	2,274.49

== Famous residents ==
Bromma is the birthplace of Mats Sundin and Douglas Murray. Per Albin Hansson, Prime Minister of Sweden from 1932 to 1946, lived in Ålsten during the last years of his life, and died on the tram in Ålsten in 1946 (while still the Prime Minister). Martin Eriksson, better known as E-Type, moved to Bromma with his family at the age of 14. Sweden's first man in space, Christer Fuglesang, was raised in Bromma. Nobel Prize laureates Gunnar and Alva Myrdal lived at several locations in Bromma along with their children, including writer Jan Myrdal.

== Sport ==
The local football team Brommapojkarna have had both the men's and women's teams in the Allsvenskan and Damallsvenskan respectively. Although not regarded as a major team in Stockholm, it has the largest youth academy in the world. Its main emphasis on producing technical and fast players. The local icehockey team is GötaTraneberg. Sweden´s most famous basketball team, Alviks BK - founded 1956 - has won the Swedish Championship 19 times since 1963.

== Economy ==
When it operated, the charter airline Scanair had its head office in Bromma.

== Notable residents ==
- Birgit Rosengren (1912–2011), actress.
- Alexandra Rapaport (1971), actress.
- Martin (E-Type) Erikson (1965), musician.

== See also ==
- Politics of Stockholm
- Västerort
- Vällingby
- Sundbyberg
- Solna
- Drottningholm
