= Beckomberga Hospital =

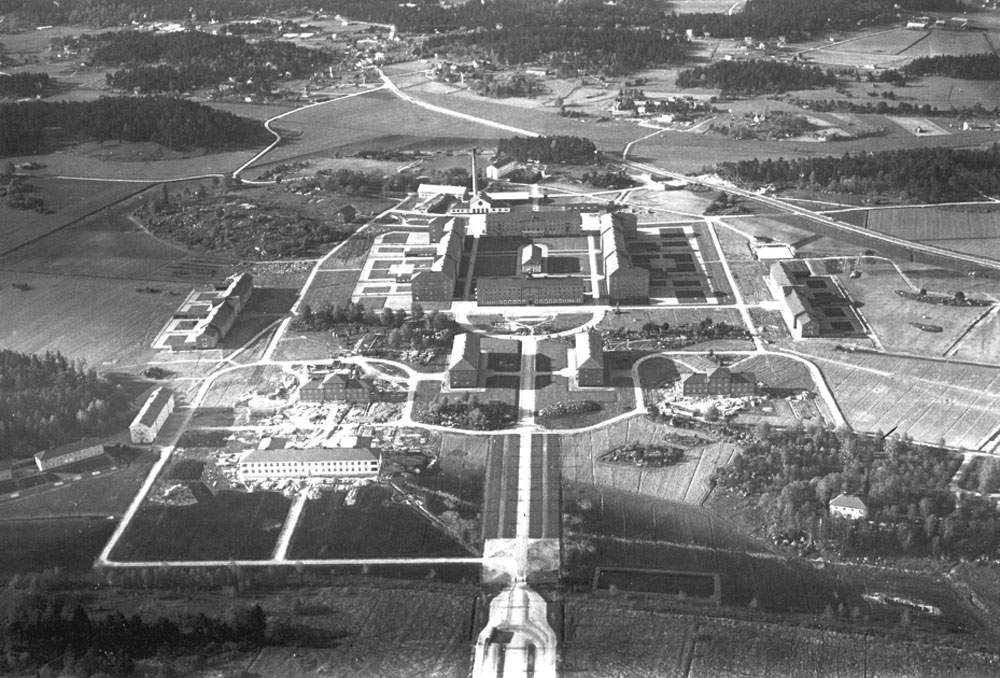
- Beckomberga Hospital during final stages of construction (c. 1935)

Geography
- Location: Stockholm County, Sweden
- Coordinates: 59°21′31″N 17°54′12″E

Organisation
- Type: Psychiatric

History
- Founded: 1935
- Closed: 1995

Links
- Lists: Hospitals in Sweden

Beckomberga Hospital (Swedish: Beckomberga sjukhus) was a Swedish psychiatric hospital, situated in Bromma, a western district of Stockholm. Opened in 1932, Beckomberga was one of the largest psychiatric hospitals in Europe, at its peak housing some 2,000 mentally ill patients. The hospital closed in 1995.

== History ==
Beckomberga Hospital was built during 1929–1935 by architect Carl Westman, who cooperated with chief surgeon Ivar Andersson to plan and design the new hospital on land acquired by the Stockholm City council in 1927. The new hospital was located some distance from the city limits, and intentionally kept isolated from urban areas. In 1932 the first section opened, ready to house 600 patients. When the construction was completed in 1935, Beckomberga Hospital was one of the largest psychiatric hospitals in Europe with rooms for 1,600 patients and approximately 800 staff.

The hospital was surrounded by high-class landscaping, which played an important part in the therapy for patients with mental illnesses. the entire hospital was designed according to classical ideas: with buildings and the hospital park arranged in a large-scale symmetrical pattern along a central north–south axis. The central axis starts in the south with a straight linden tree avenue, up to a semi-circular square before the central part of the hospital.

Four massive four-storey buildings, which were originally interconnected with high walls, create a closed rectangular courtyard. Women and men were separated in each long building: with female patients housed in the western building and male patients in the eastern one. Administration was located in the southern building, and the northern housed the kitchen facility. In the center of the courtyard is located a lower bricked building which was utilized as auditorium and church. The courtyard had strict landscaping with small trees, trimmed like pyramids. Almost all buildings surrounding the central complex were also strictly arranged according to the symmetrical pattern.

The buildings are relatively soberly designed with few distinct details; the overall impression is monumental. The interior, however, has gradually been changed and very little remains from the original interior. An exception is the auditorium in the central courtyard, which keeps its original interior, with ceiling paintings, a stage and balcony with classical decoration. This building along with the administration building are listed as blue (class I) – buildings of most historical importance. The remaining original buildings are listed as green (class II) – important from a culture-historical perspective.

The central hospital unit was surrounded by a park with spacious lawns, extensive gardens and linden tree avenues, though some natural hill formations were kept. Since the hospital opened in the mid-1930s, only a few more buildings were added. The hospital area, therefore, kept its original character. However, since the hospital finally closed in 1995, the city council has decided to convert the area into housing development, putting the future of the historic buildings and parks in jeopardy.

== Notable patients ==
- Sigrid Hjertén - died at the hospital in 1948 after a botched lobotomy prescripted to treat her schizophrenia.
- Nelly Sachs - admitted in 1960 after a series of nervous breakdowns.
