= Ulvsunda Castle =

Manor house in Stockholm, Sweden

Coordinates: 59°20′27″N 17°57′50″E

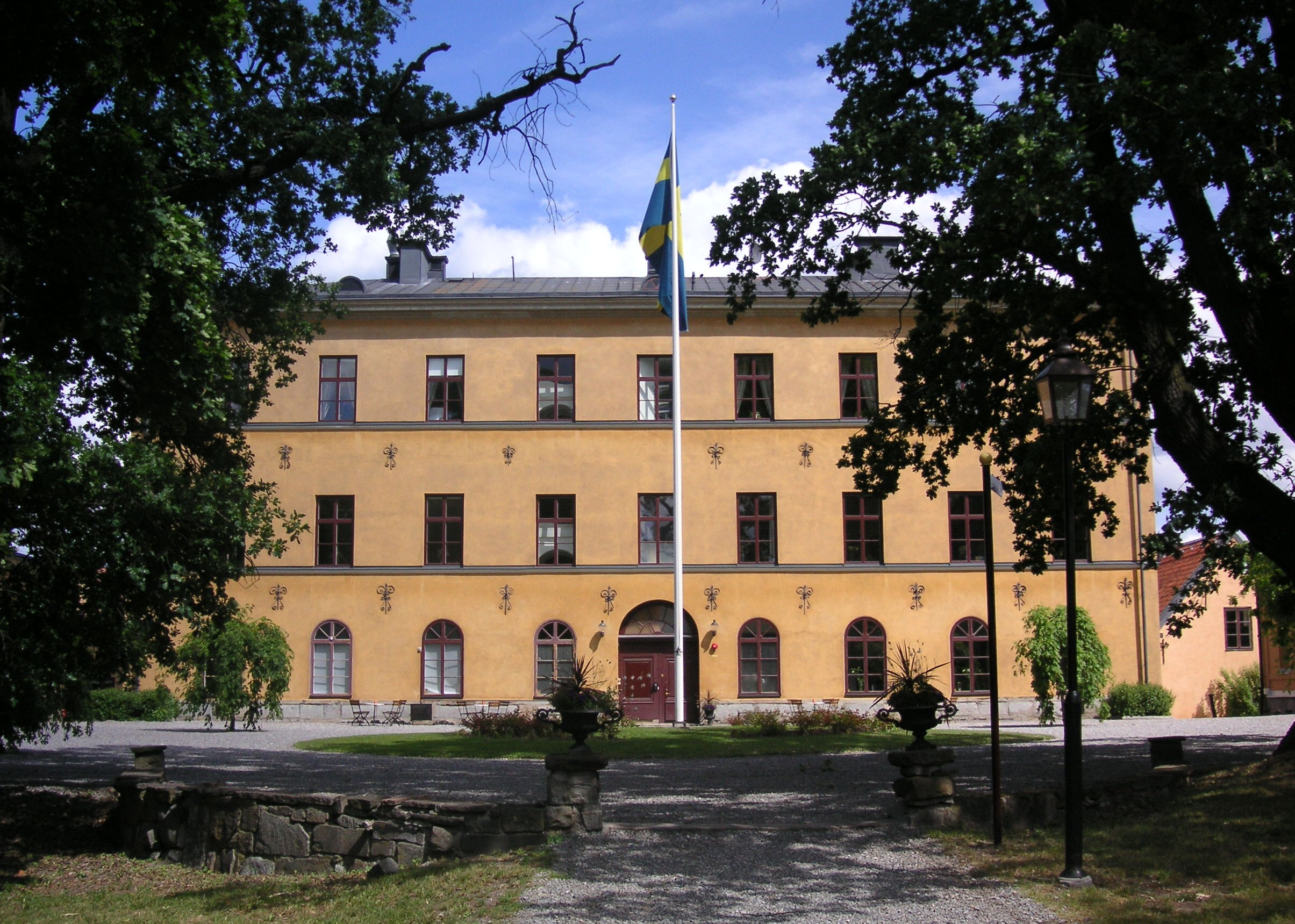
Ulvsunda Castle

Ulvsunda Castle (Ulfsunda slott) is a manor house at Bromma in Stockholm, Sweden.

== History ==
The building was built in 1644–1647 by Field Marshal Lennart Torstenson (1603–1651). The current appearance of the building dates from the 1830s. The baronial family Åkerhielm family came to own Ulvsunda in the years 1843–1902. Prime Minister Gustaf Åkerhielm (1833–1900) used the estate principally as a summer residence. His heirs sold most of the property in 1902. In 1904, the city of Stockholm bought the property. Ulvsunda is today a hotel and conference facility.

== See also ==
- List of castles in Sweden
