= Mariehäll =

Urban district in Stockholm, Sweden

Coordinates: 59°21′40″N 17°56′55″E

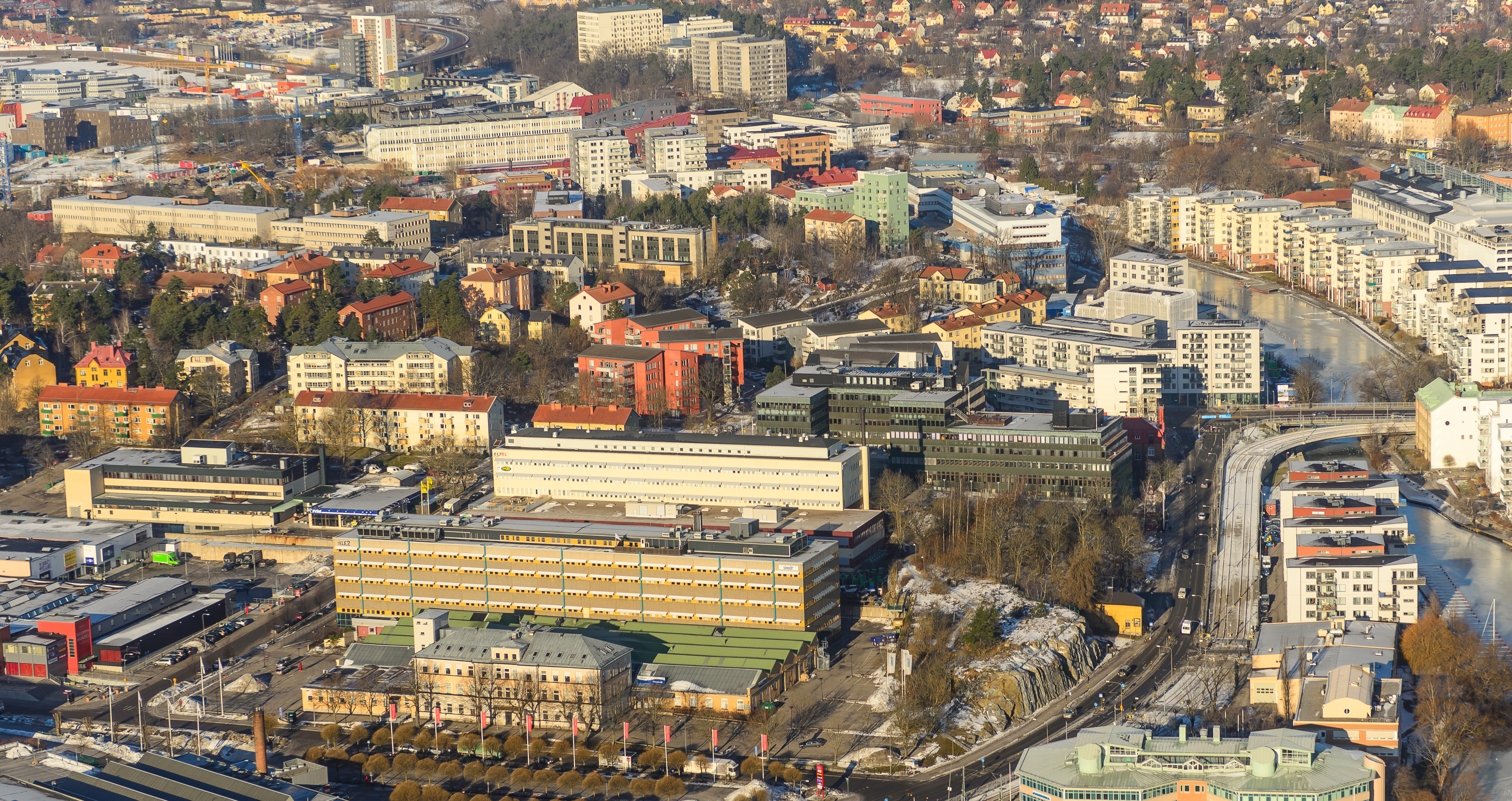
Mariehäll viewed from the south in 2013

Mariehäll is a suburb of Stockholm and a district in the north-east of the Bromma borough of Stockholm Municipality. In 2019, Mariehäll had 9,024 inhabitants.

Mariehäll was originally part of the farm Bällsta. At the end of the 19th century Mariehäll became an industrial area, owing to its proximity to the then recently founded suburb Sundbyberg. An area of detached homes south-west of Mariehäll, then called Bällsta villastad, came to be included within Mariehäll. By 2003 the number of inhabitants were 1,368. In the 2000s, a high-density residential area called Annedal was built in northern Mariehäll, increasing its population manifold. Light rail (Tvärbanan line L30) was built along the west side of Mariehäll and opened in 2003 stopping at the nearby Karlsbodavägen and Bällsta bro. Another Tvärbanan line, L31, was built to Bromma Airport just south of Mariehäll in 2020 which has now opened.
