= Traneberg =

Coordinates: 59.335926°N 17.985701°E

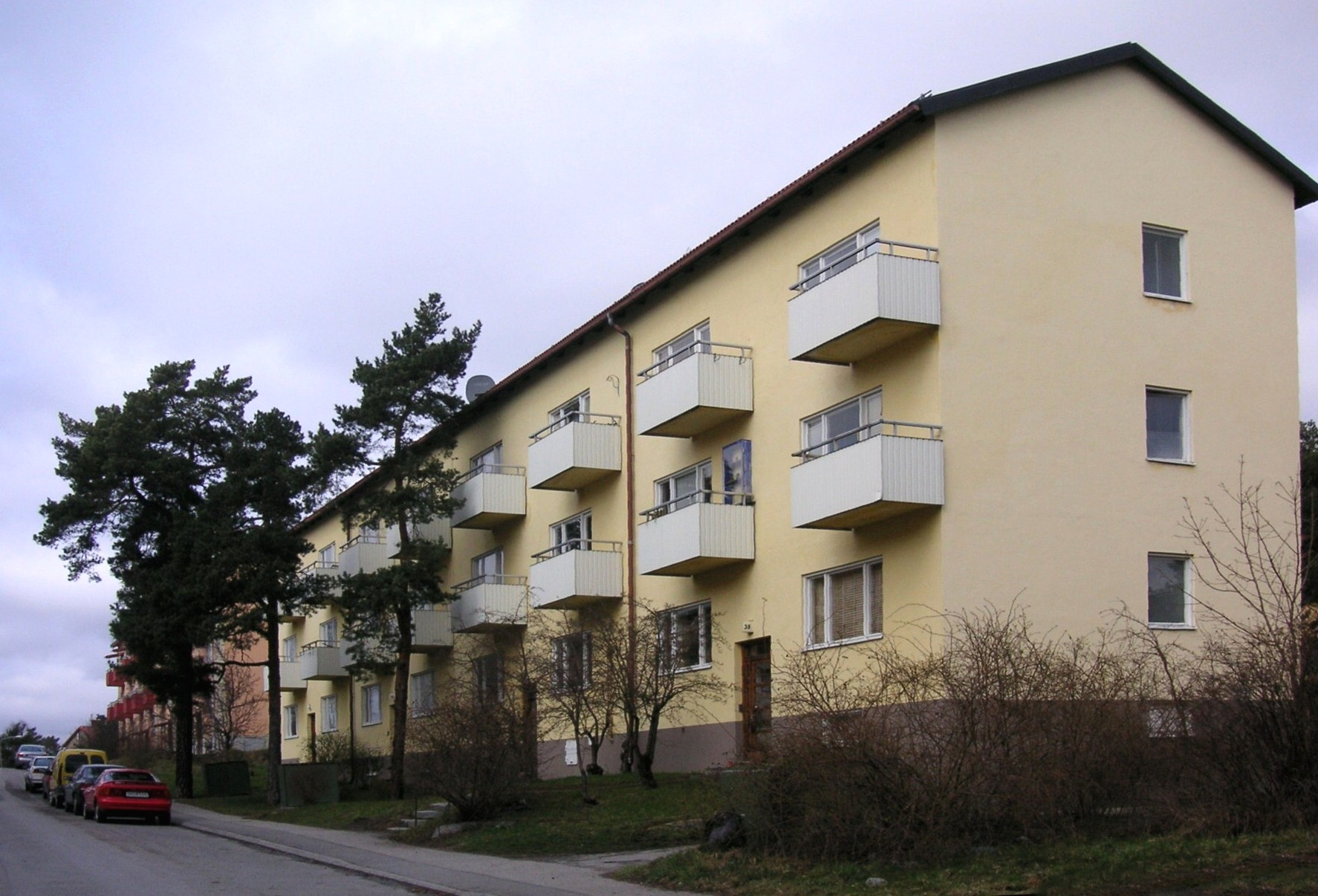
Apartment building in Traneberg

Traneberg is a residential district in western Stockholm (Västerort) and part of the Bromma borough. For the 1912 Summer Olympics, Tranebergs Idrottsplats hosted some of the football competitions.

Most of the district was built between 1934 and 1940.

== See also ==
- Alvik metro station
