= Riksby =

Suburb in Stockholm, Sweden

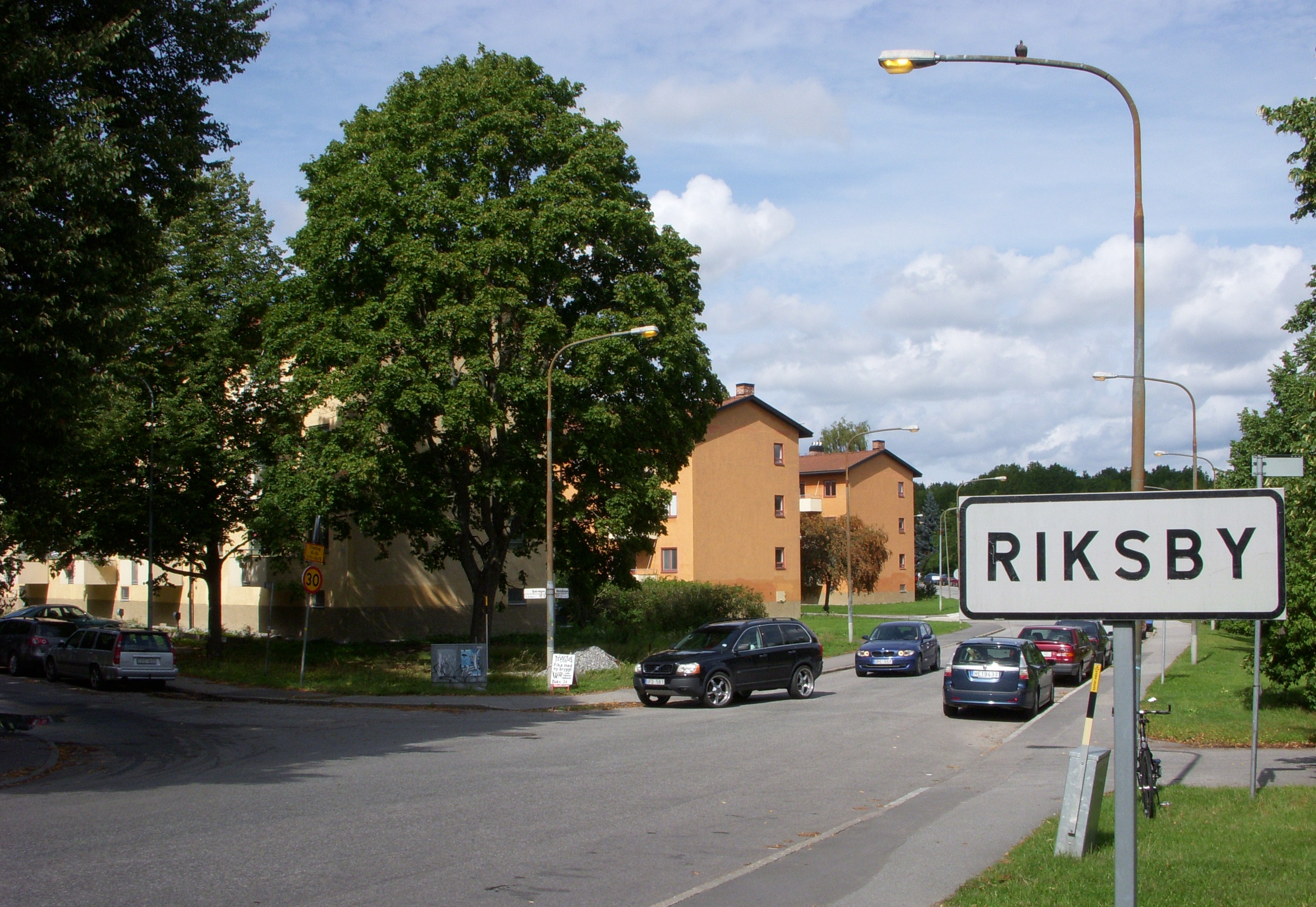
Riksby in Bromma

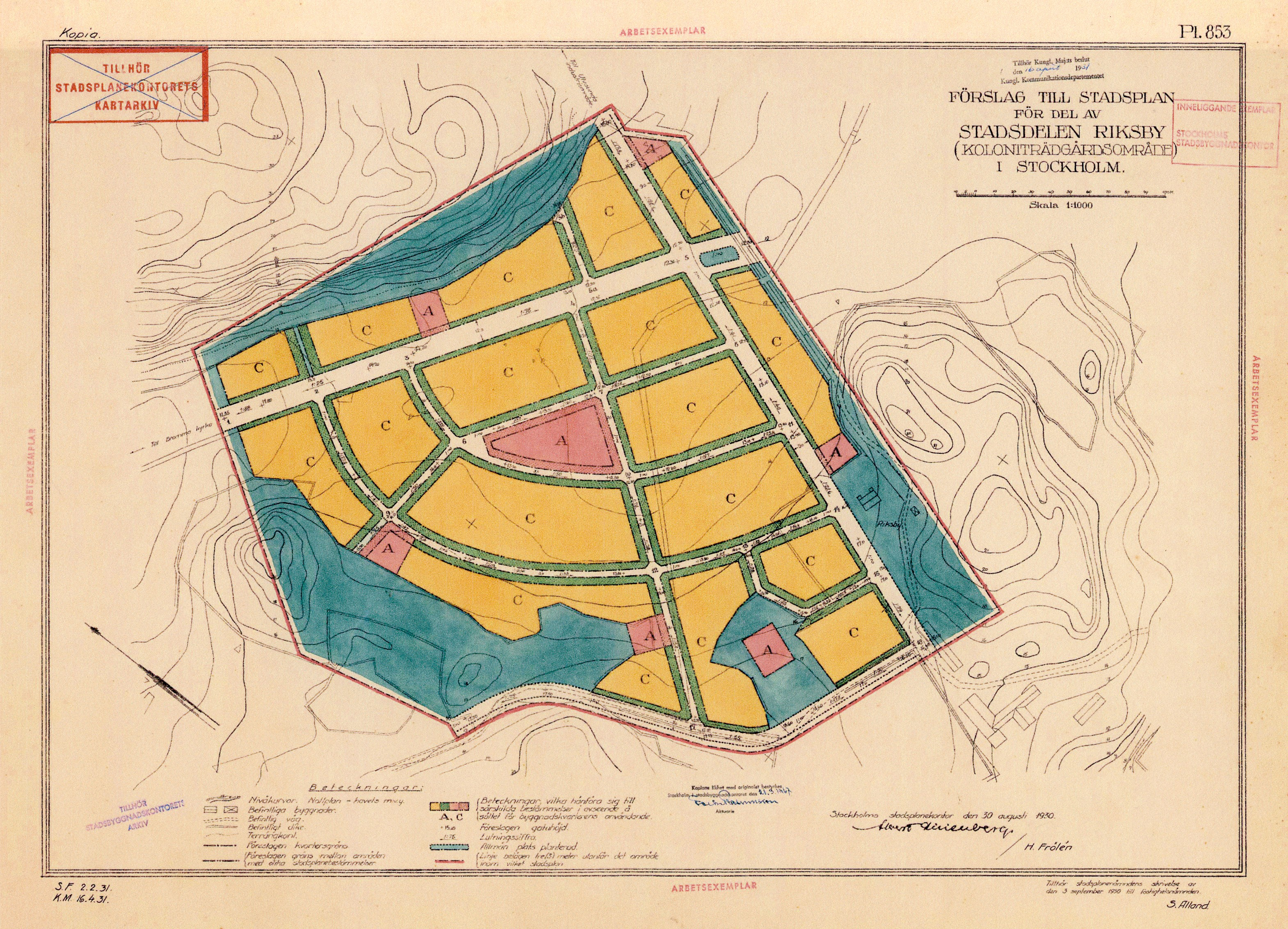
City plans for Riksby allotment area, August 30, 1930

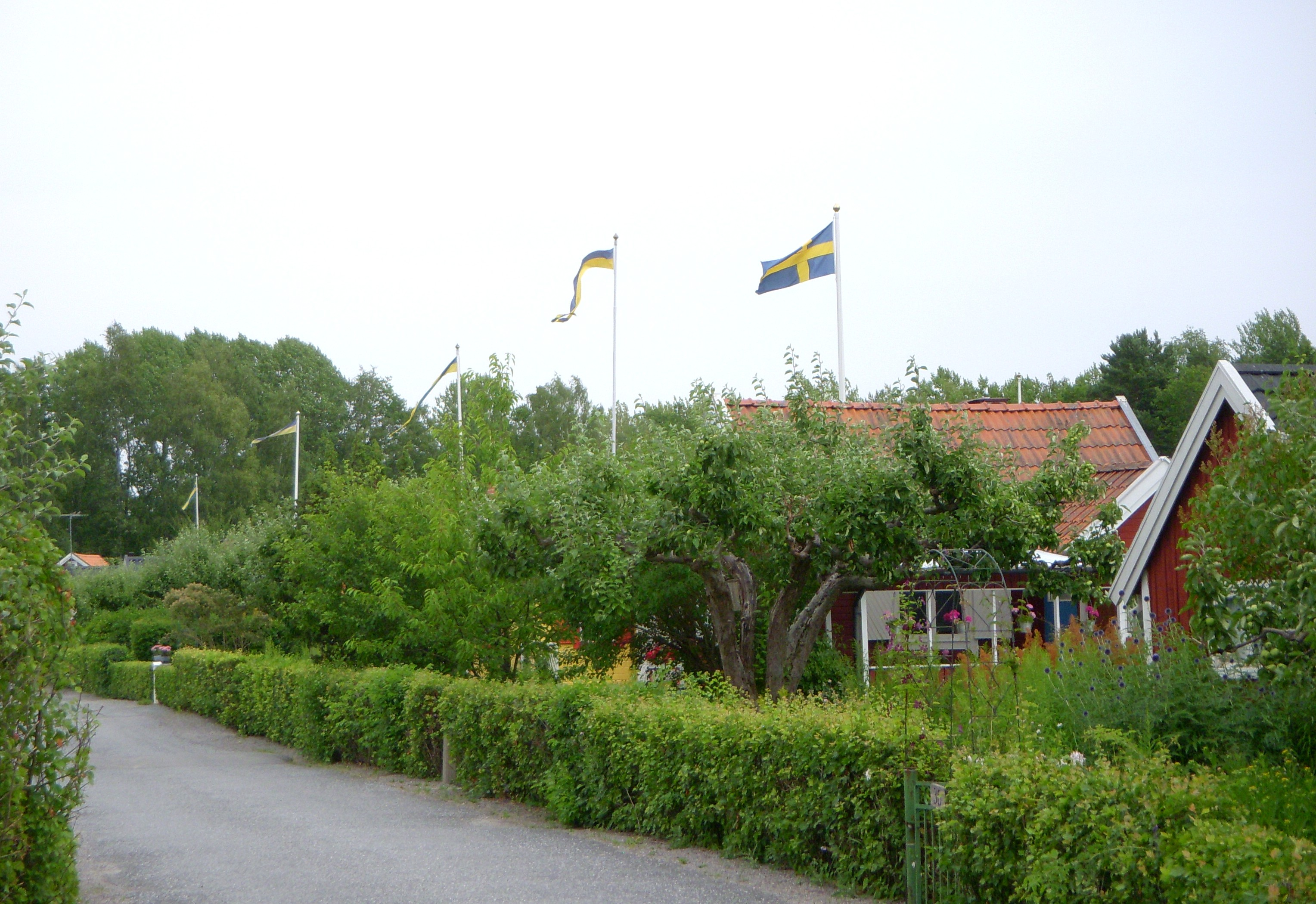
Kortenslund

Riksby is a suburb within the district of Västerort in Stockholm, Sweden. It is located in the borough of Bromma.

== History ==
The name "Riksby" is derived from Riksby gård, a farm once located in the parish of Bromma parish. The village of Riksby was mentioned for the first time in a parish letter from 1409, when it was known as Rodhersby.

Stockholm Municipality bought the land in the year 1904. It was previously a part of the estate of Åkeshofs Castle (Åkeshof Slott).

In 1930, Riksby became an allotment. Because of this the house owners moved from the old Fredhällskolonin on Kungsholmen to Riksby. The district was established in 1926. In 1939 it was decided that the area was to be an apartment area and the following year the colonizers were to move to Iris Glia and Kortenslund. During the interwar period several colony areas in Bromma were added. Riksby allotment was added in 1930. Iris Glia and Iris Riksby were established in the year 1939. Kortenslund was founded 1939–1940.

The area for Riksby allotment area is planned through zoning. Riksby allotment area is one of the few allotments in Stockholm that are set in a city plan with official city blocks and roads and is one of the four allotments that is located like a string around the southern and south-western side of Bromma Airport. According to Stockholm city planning office they are included in areas where attention needs to be devoted to culture historical values.

== Demography ==
In 2017 the neighborhood had about 4200 residents, where 26.2% were of foreign background.

== Runestones ==
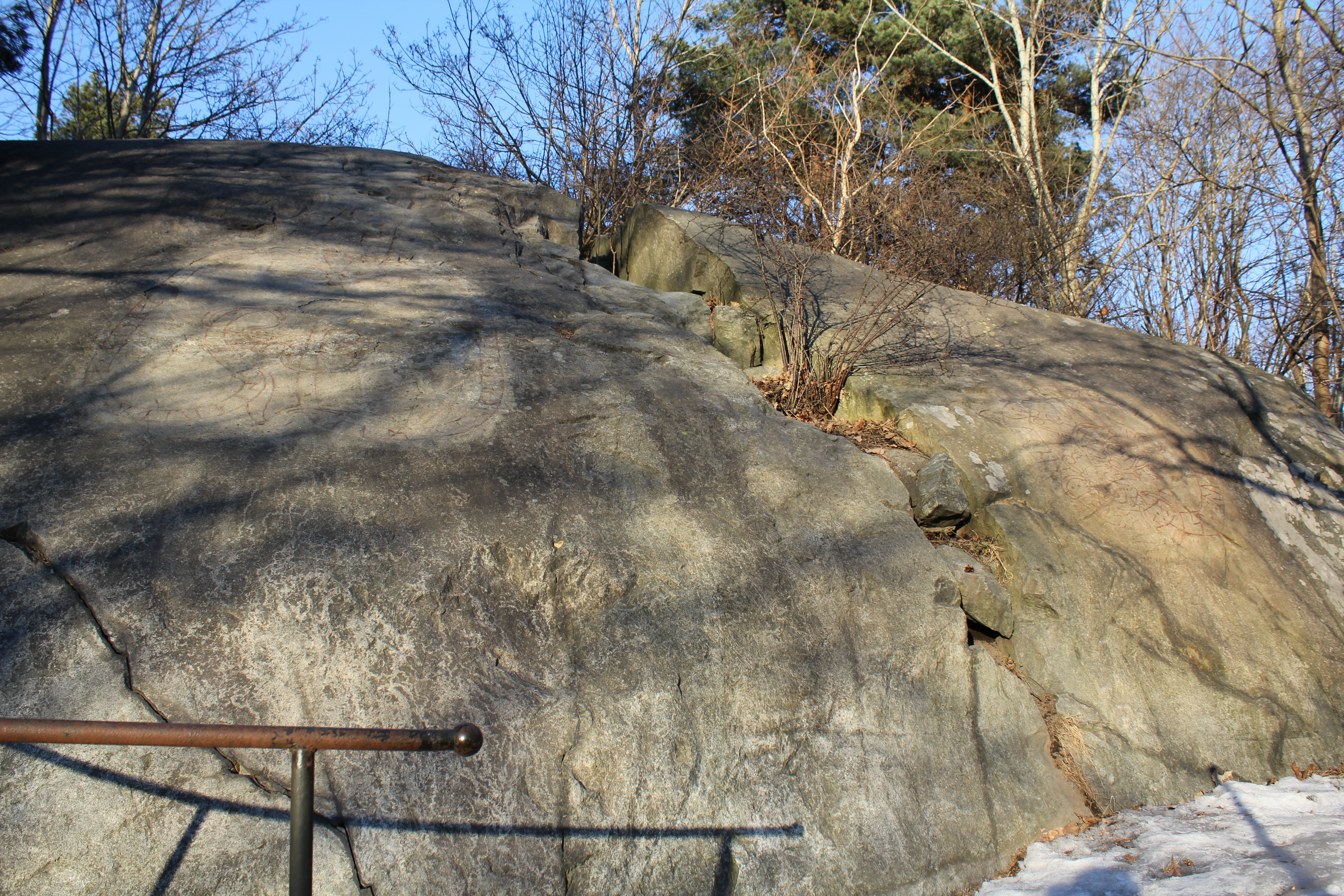
Rune carvings U58 and U59 on a cliff by Drottningholmsvägen in Riksby.

Riksby has several tourist attractions, such as the runestones at Drottningholmsvägen and at the old boatman's wharf (Norrby båtsmanstorp).

The Runestone that has two rune carvings estimated to have been created around the year 1070.

- Left carving (U58): Sigvid och Sigrev läto rista denna sten efter Sinar, sin fader . English translation: " Sigvid and Sigrev had this stone be carved after Sinar, their father".
- Right carving (U59) : Närt lät rista dessa runor efter sin fader Faste. Ulv högg . English translation: " Närt had these runes carved after his father Faste. Ulv carved "

=== Gallery ===
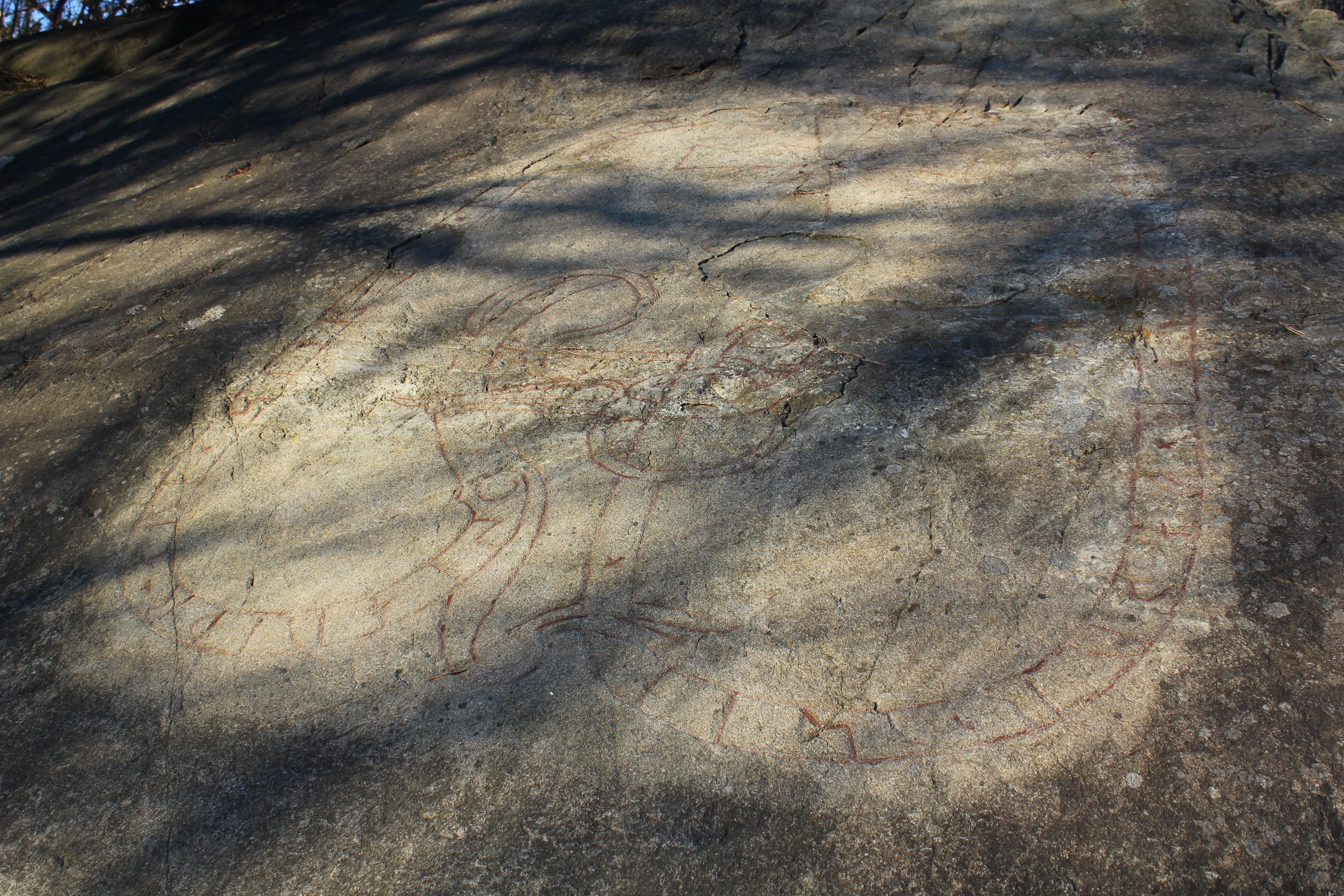
Rune carving, Riksbyhällen, on the cliff, U58, is very artistically executed.

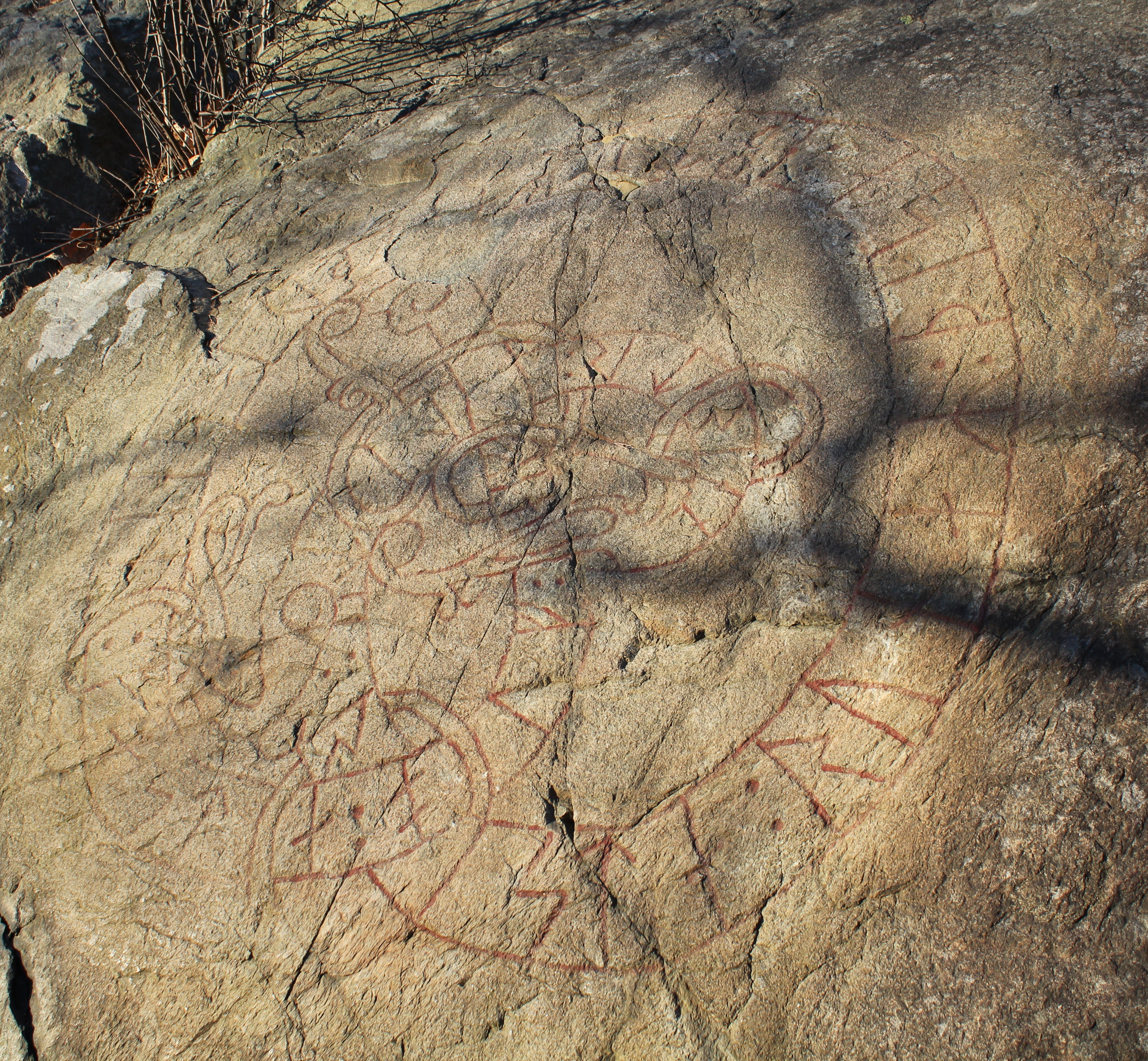
Rune carving, Riksbyhällen, on the cliff, U59, has a simpler carving.

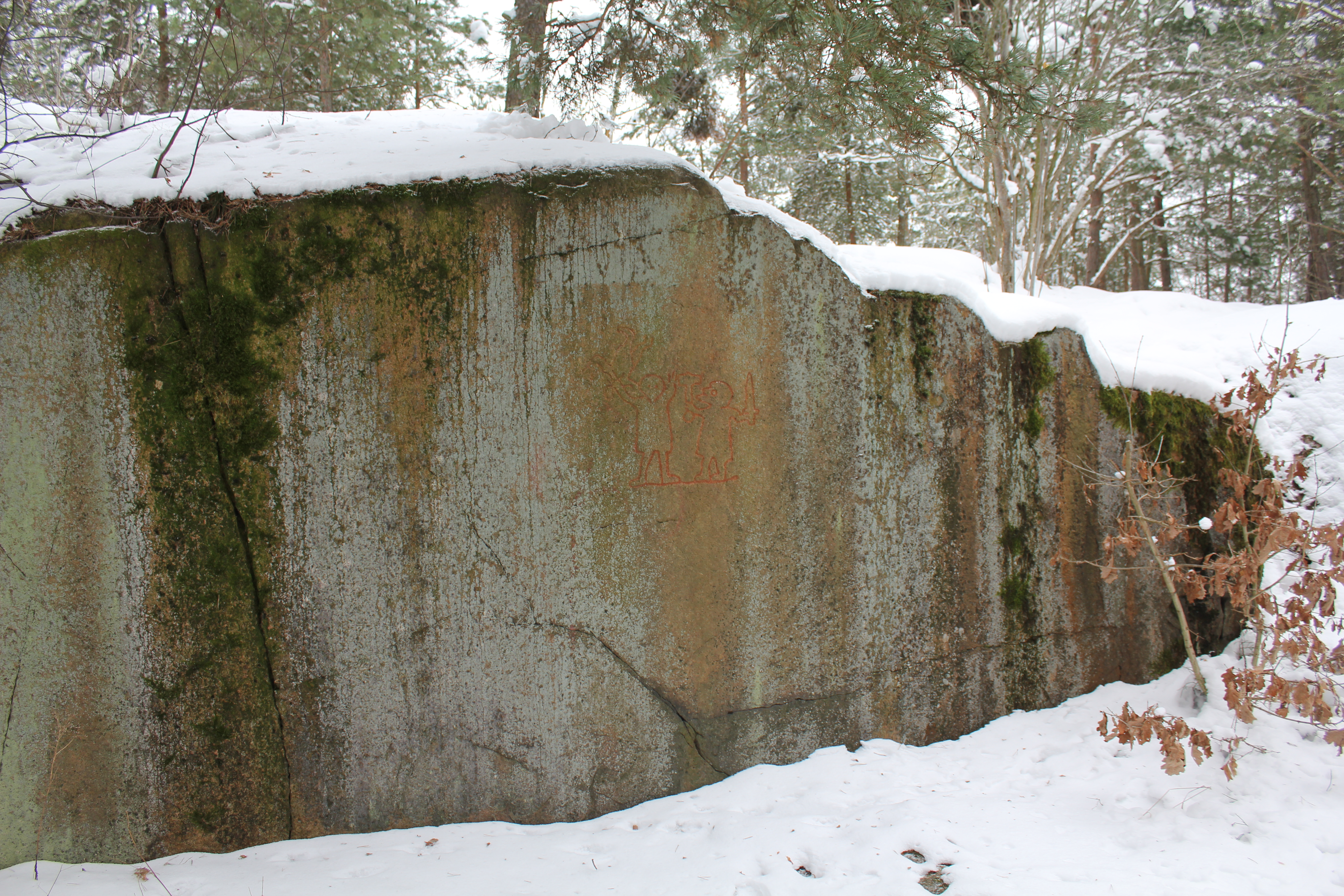
A picture stone on the vertical cliff near Riksby's old burial field.

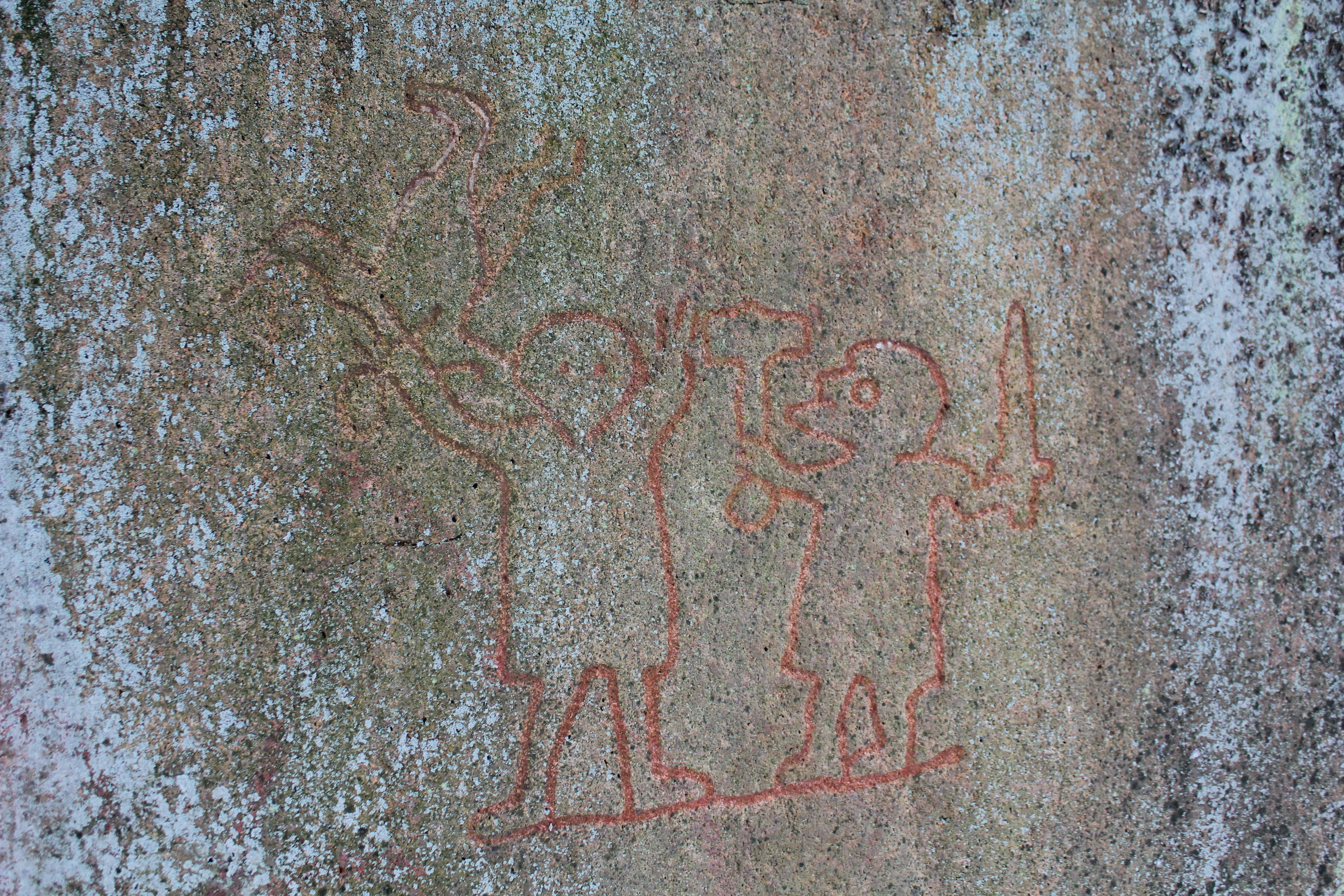
The picture stone, Riksbyristningen, represents the gods Odin and Thor.

== See also ==
- Stockholm Bromma Airport

== Related reading ==
- Claiborne W. Thompson (2014) Studies in Upplandic Runography (University of Texas Press) ISBN 9780292769427
