= Åkeslund =

Urban district in Stockholm, Sweden

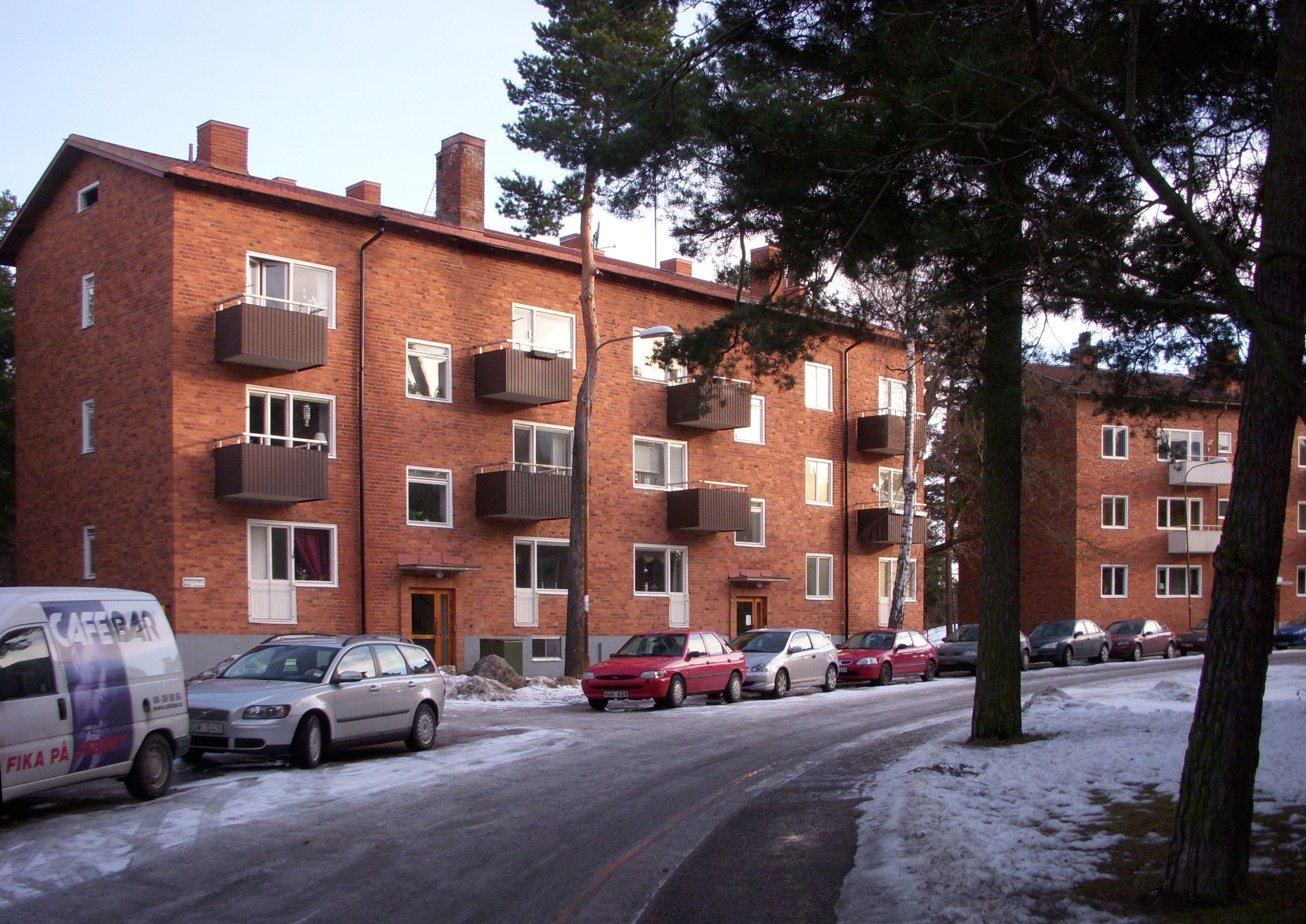

Åkeslund is a residential district in western Stockholm Municipality and part of the Bromma borough.
