= Råcksta metro station =

Stockholm Metro station

Råcksta
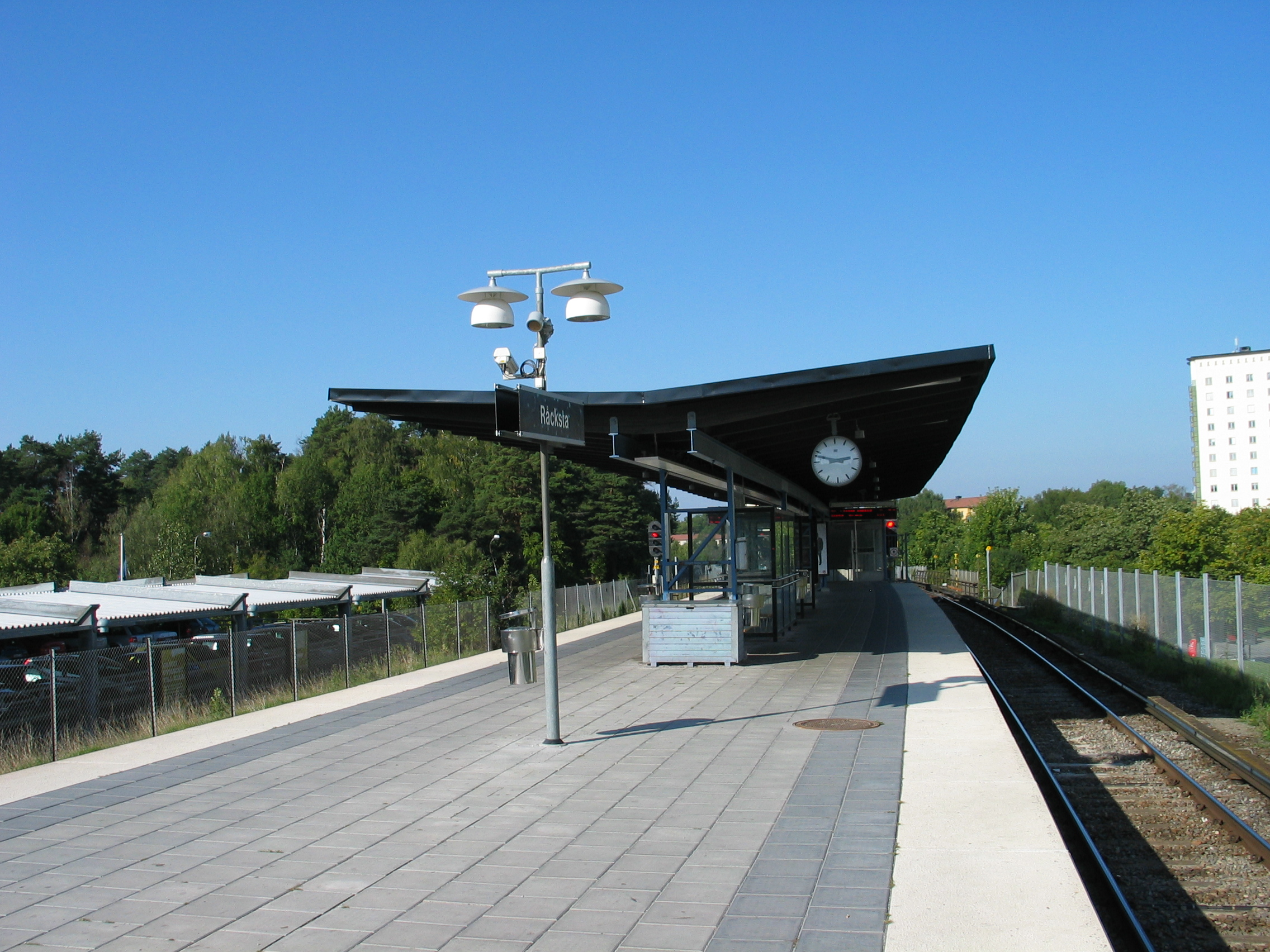
- Station platform, 2006

General information
- Coordinates: 59°21′17″N 17°52′54″E
- System: Stockholm Metro station
- Owner: Storstockholms Lokaltrafik
- Platforms: 1 island platform
- Tracks: 2

Construction
- Structure type: Elevated
- Accessible: Yes

Other information
- Station code: RÅC

History
- Opened: 26 October 1952; 73 years ago

Passengers
- 2019: 4,800 boarding per weekday

Services
| Preceding station | Stockholm Metro | Following station |
|---|---|---|
| Vällingby towards Hässelby strand | Line 19 | Blackeberg towards Hagsätra |
Location
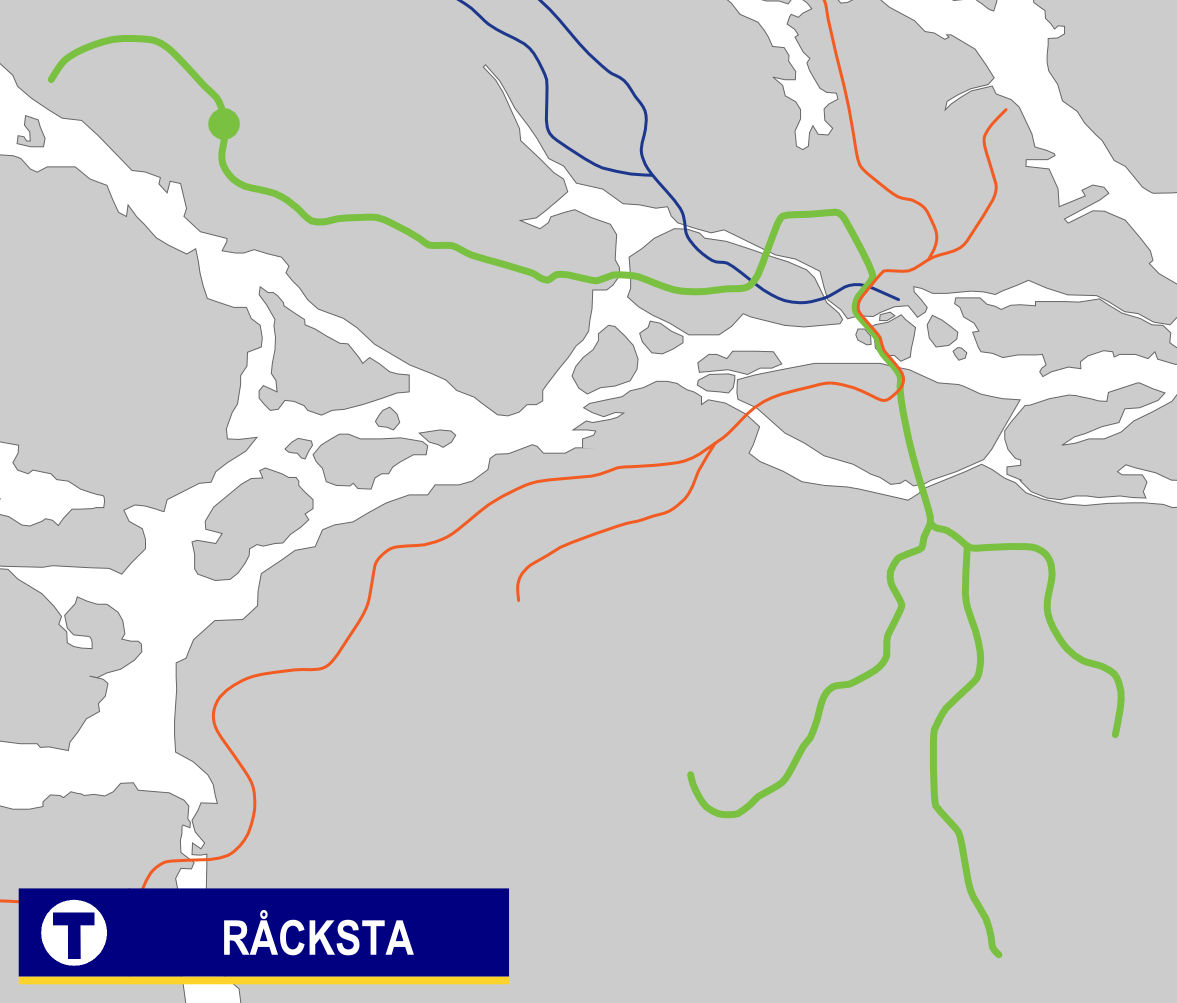

Råcksta metro station is a station on the Green Line of the Stockholm Metro. It is located in the district of Råcksta, which is part of the borough of Hässelby-Vällingby in the west of the city of Stockholm. The station is situated on an embankment and has a single island platform, with access from a lower level station building on Jämtlandsgatan. The distance to Slussen is 14.8 km (9.2 mi).

The station was inaugurated on 26 October 1952 as a part of the section of line between Hötorget and Vällingby.

As part of Art in the Stockholm Metro project, the walls of the ticket hall were decorated with ceramic friezes and hand-glazed tiles by Mia Göransson.

The Vällingby metro depot (Vällingby t-banedepå) is located to the west of the station and accessed from the station by a simple junction.

== Gallery ==
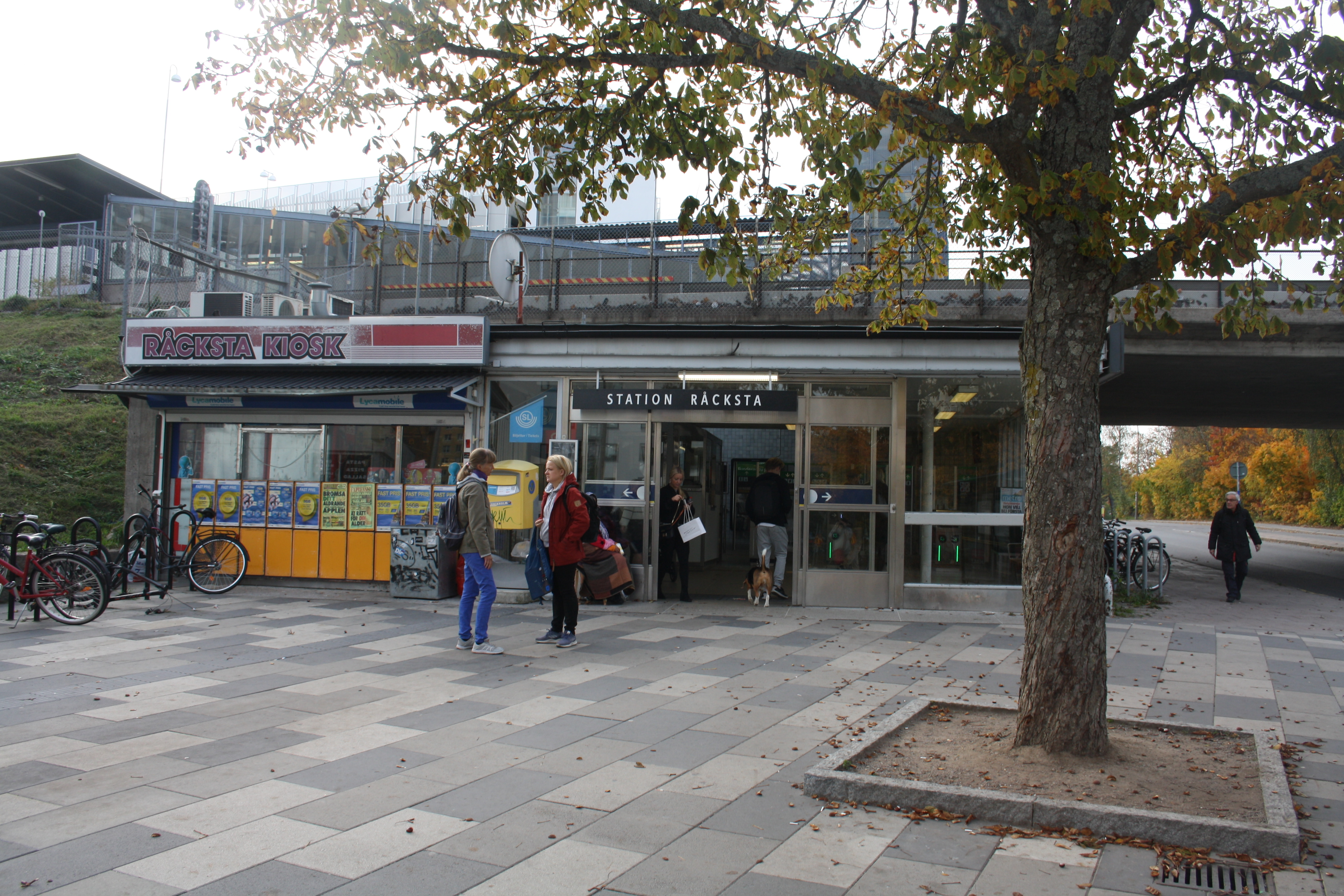
Entrance to station, 2018

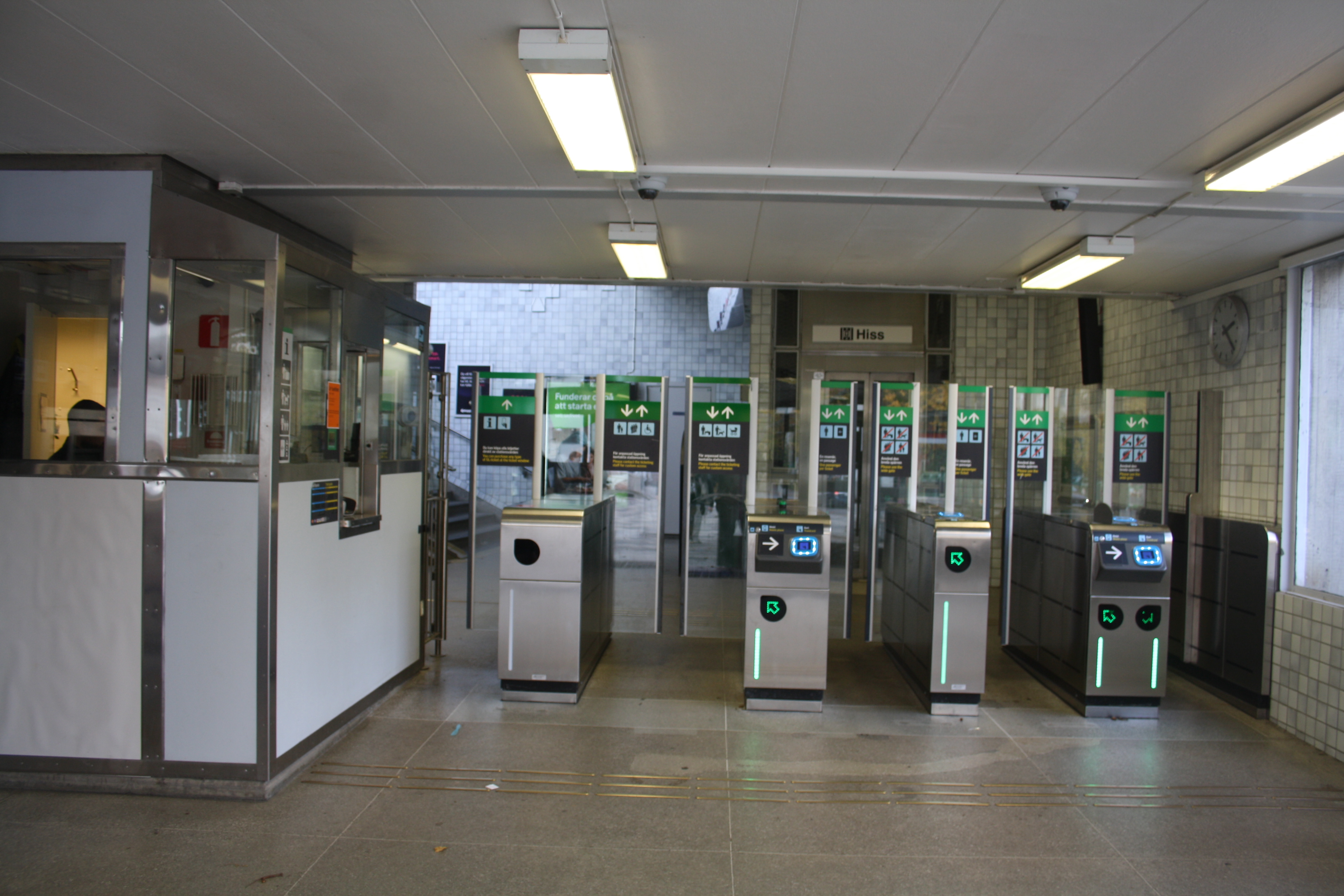
Inside the station building, 2018

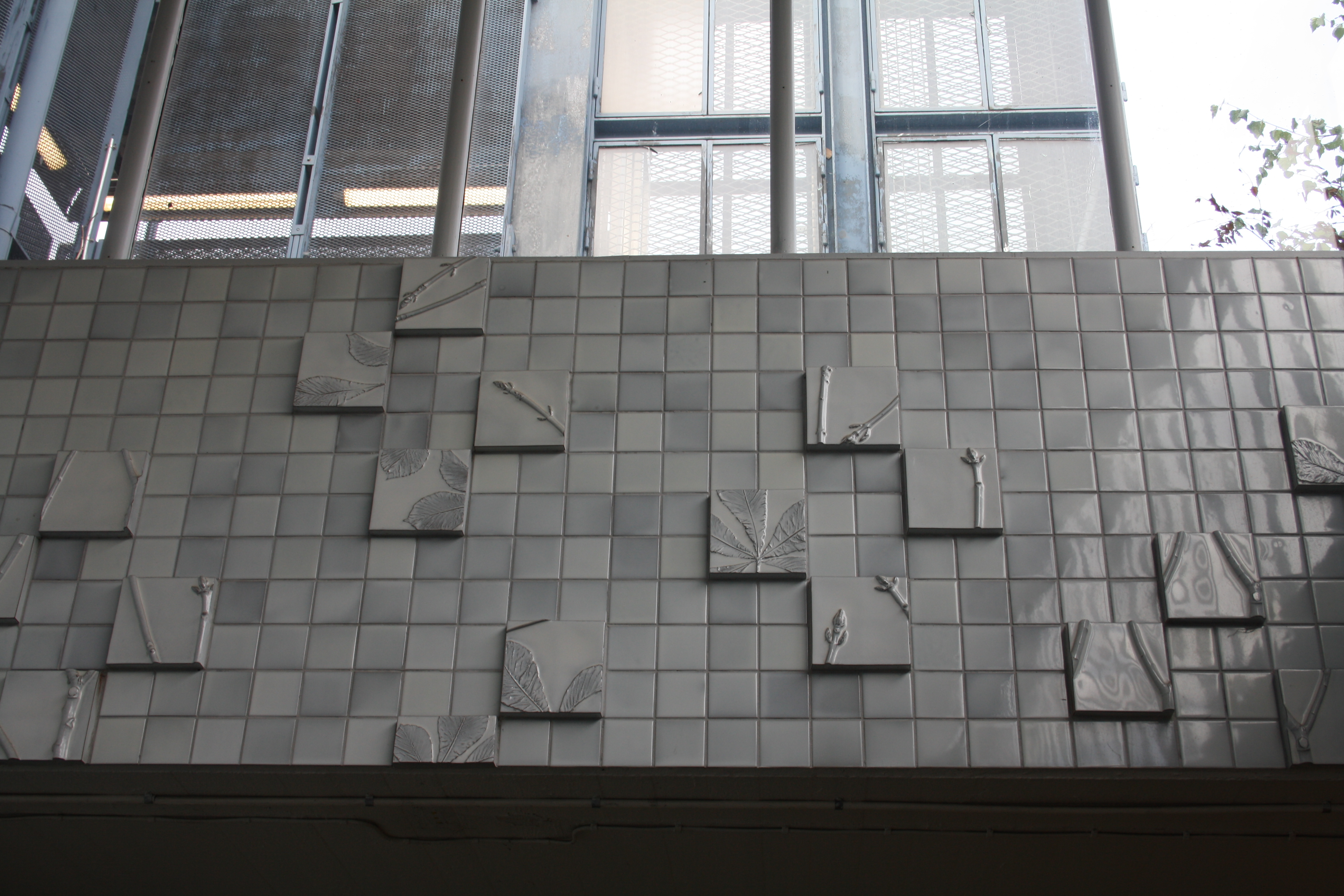
Art in the Metro, 2018

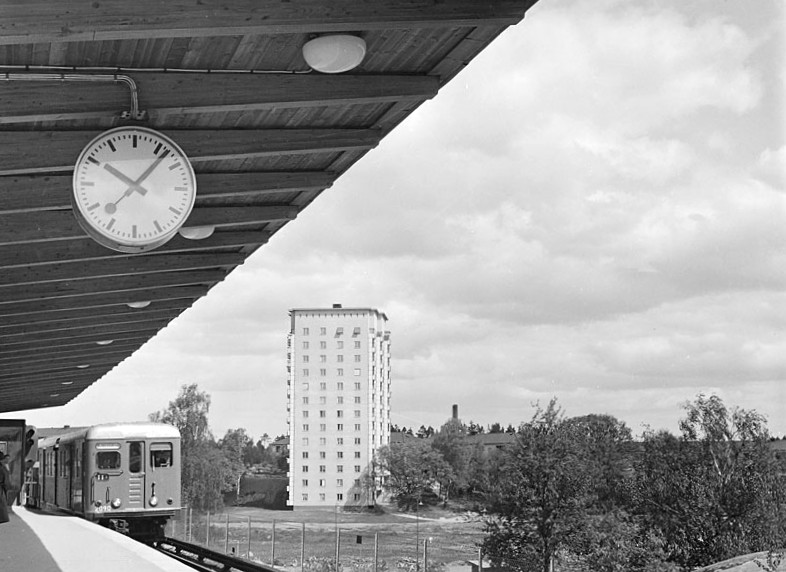
Station in 1955
