= Johannelund metro station =

Stockholm Metro station

Johannelund
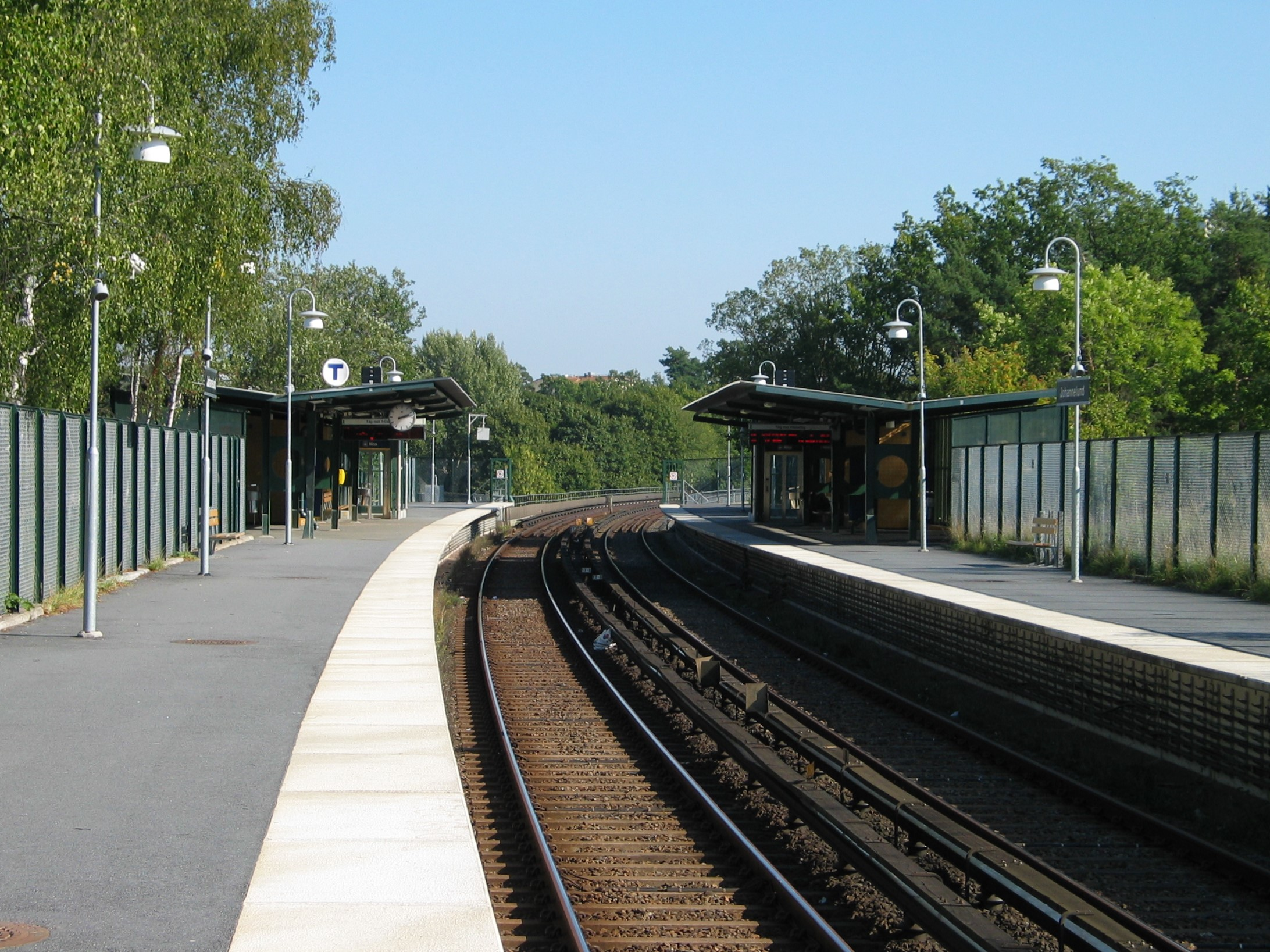
- Station platforms, 2006

General information
- Coordinates: 59°22′4″N 17°51′28″E
- System: Stockholm Metro station
- Owner: Storstockholms Lokaltrafik
- Distance: 17.0 km (10.6 mi) from Slussen
- Platforms: 2 side platforms
- Tracks: 2

Construction
- Structure type: At grade
- Accessible: Yes

Other information
- Station code: JOL

History
- Opened: 1 November 1956; 69 years ago

Passengers
- 2019: 1,250 boarding per weekday

Services
Preceding station	Stockholm Metro	Following station
Hässelby gård towards Hässelby strand	Line 19	Vällingby towards Hagsätra
Location
- Location within Stockholm Municipality

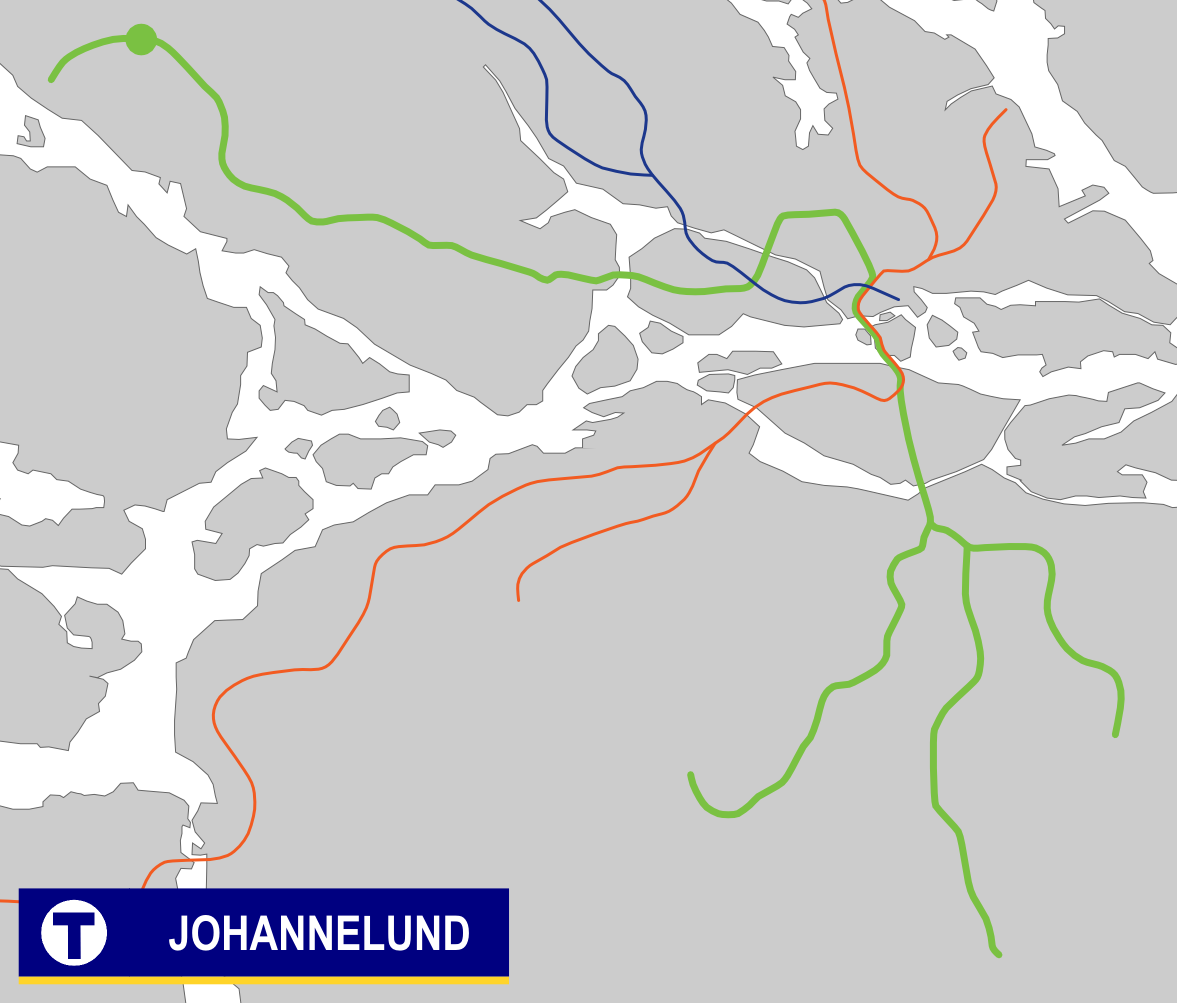

Johannelund metro station is a station on the Green Line of the Stockholm Metro. It is located in the district of Vinsta, which is part of the borough of Hässelby-Vällingby in the west of the city of Stockholm. The distance to Slussen is 17 km (11 mi).

The station was inaugurated on 1 November 1956 as part of an extension from Vällingby to Hässelby gård. Up until October 1997 the station was only in use in the daytime, and was closed weekends. It is the only Stockholm Metro station with side platforms instead of the island platform present at most other stations.

Only 700 passengers travel from Johannelund station daily, making it the least used in the Stockholm metro.
