= Hässelby station =

Hässelby station may refer to:

- Hässelby gård metro station, a station on the Green line of the metro in Stockholm, Sweden
- Hässelby strand metro station, a station on the Green line of the metro in Stockholm, Sweden
- Hässelby villastads station, a former station on the Spånga to Lövsta railway in Stockholm, Sweden
