= Gard (disambiguation) =

Gard is a département located in southern France in the Languedoc-Roussillon region. It may also refer to:

== Places ==
=== Places in France ===
- Pont du Gard, a Roman aqueduct bridge
- Vers-Pont-du-Gard, a commune in the Gard department
- Rochefort-du-Gard, a commune in the Gard department
- Saint-Jean-du-Gard, a commune in the Gard department
- Castillon-du-Gard, a commune in the Gard department
- Saint-Gilles-du-Gard, a commune in the Gard department
- Saint-Bonnet-du-Gard, a commune in the Gard department
- Saint-Mamert-du-Gard, a commune in the Gard department
- Gard, alternate name for Gardon, French river

=== Places in Scandinavia ===
- Enskede gård, community in Söderort, Stockholm, Sweden
- Hässelby gård, suburban district west of Stockholm belonging to the Hässelby-Vällingby borough
- Skarpnäcks gård, district (stadsdel) in Skarpnäck in Stockholm Municipality, Sweden
- Erichsens Gård, now part of Bornholms Museum
- Grönvik gård, mansion in the village of Grönvik, Korsholm municipality in Western Finland
- Smådalarö Gård, inn located at Dalarö in Stockholm archipelago (Stockholm, Sweden)
- Leangen Gård
- Farm Gård, definition of every farm or larger country home in Denmark and Sweden.

=== Places in other countries ===
- Gard, a tributary of the river Jijia in Romania
- Gard (Slavic toponymy), Slavic toponym

== People ==
=== Surname ===
- Alex Gard (1898–1948), Russian cartoonist
- Cătălin-Ionuț Gârd (born 1981), Romanian tennis player
- Charlie Gard (2016–2017), British infant; subject of parental rights and life support cases
- George E. Gard (1843–1904), American police chief and sheriff
- Jean-Paul Martin-du-Gard (1927–2017), French athlete
- John Gard (born 1963), American politician
- Léon Gard (1901–1979), French painter and art critic
- Lewis Gard (born 1999), English footballer
- Mike Gard (born 1952), Australian politician
- Phil Gard (1947–1990), New Zealand rugby union player
- Robert G. Gard Jr., American military strategist
- Robert Gard (tenor), 1927–2021, Australian operatic tenor
- Roger Martin du Gard (1881–1958), French author and winner of the 1937 Nobel Prize for Literature
- Toby Gard (born 1972), English computer game character designer and consultant
- Trevor Gard (born 1957), English cricketer
- Warren Gard (1873–1929), American attorney, prosecutor, jurist and politician
- William Du Gard (1606–1662), English schoolmaster and printer; see William Dugard

=== Given name ===
- Gard Kvale (born 1984), Norwegian swimmer
- Gard Agdi, Norse mythological figure; a son of Nór

== Other ==
- Assuranceforeningen Gard, marine insurance company
- Genetic and Rare Diseases Information Center, a program of the NIH National Center for Advancing Translational Sciences
- Gard model for prebiotic evolution.

== See also ==
- Gord (disambiguation)
- Garde (disambiguation)
- Gart (disambiguation)
- Grad (disambiguation)
- Dugard (disambiguation)
- Guard (disambiguation)
