= Blackeberg metro station =

Stockholm Metro station

Blackeberg
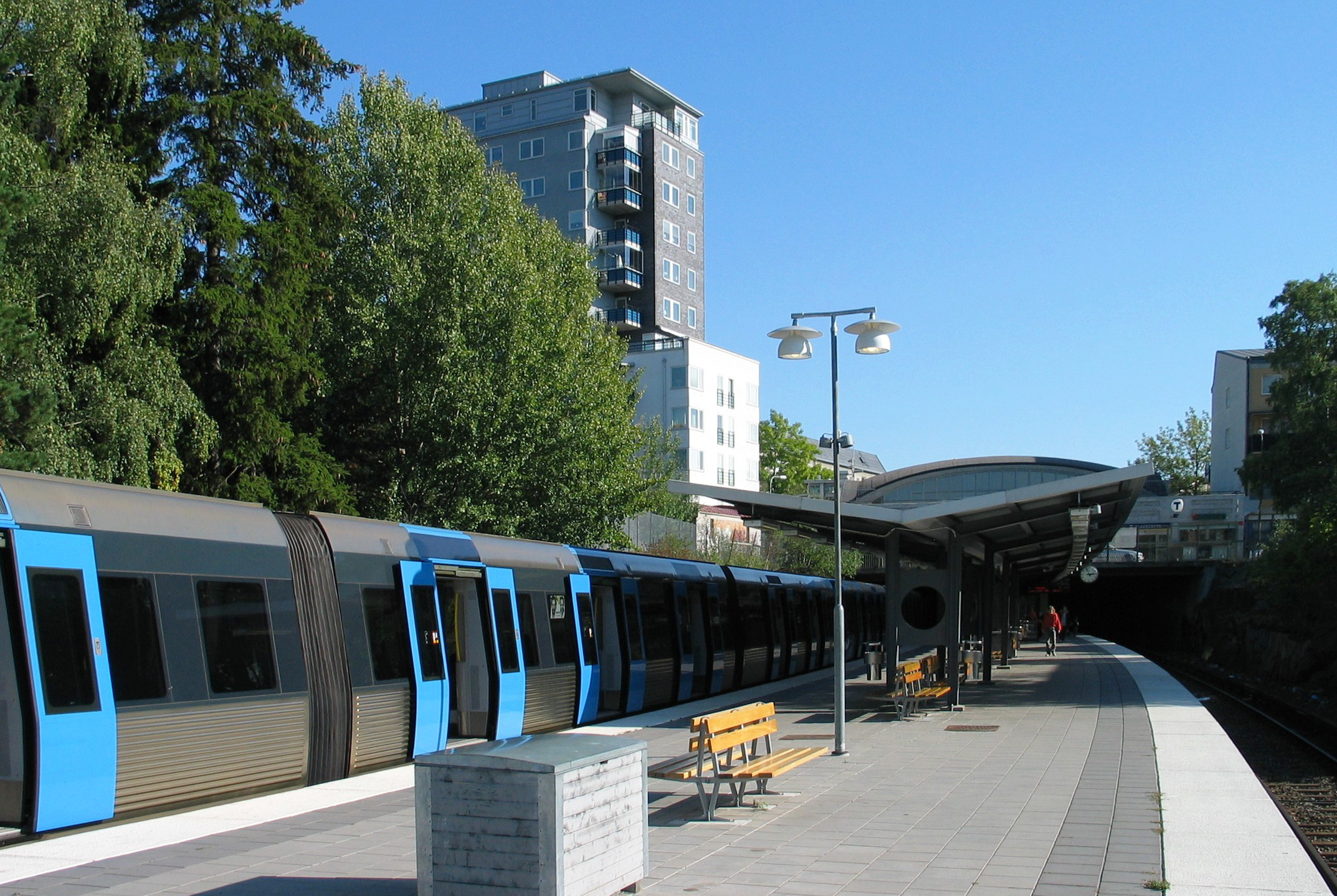
- Outdoor part of platform, 2006

General information
- Coordinates: 59°20′54″N 17°52′57″E
- System: Stockholm Metro station
- Owner: Storstockholms Lokaltrafik
- Distance: 14.1 km (8.8 mi) from Slussen
- Platforms: 1 island platform
- Tracks: 2

Construction
- Structure type: At grade
- Accessible: Yes

Other information
- Station code: BLB

History
- Opened: 26 October 1952; 73 years ago

Passengers
- 2019: 4,700 boarding per weekday

Services
Preceding station	Stockholm Metro	Following station
Råcksta towards Hässelby strand	Line 19	Islandstorget towards Hagsätra
Location
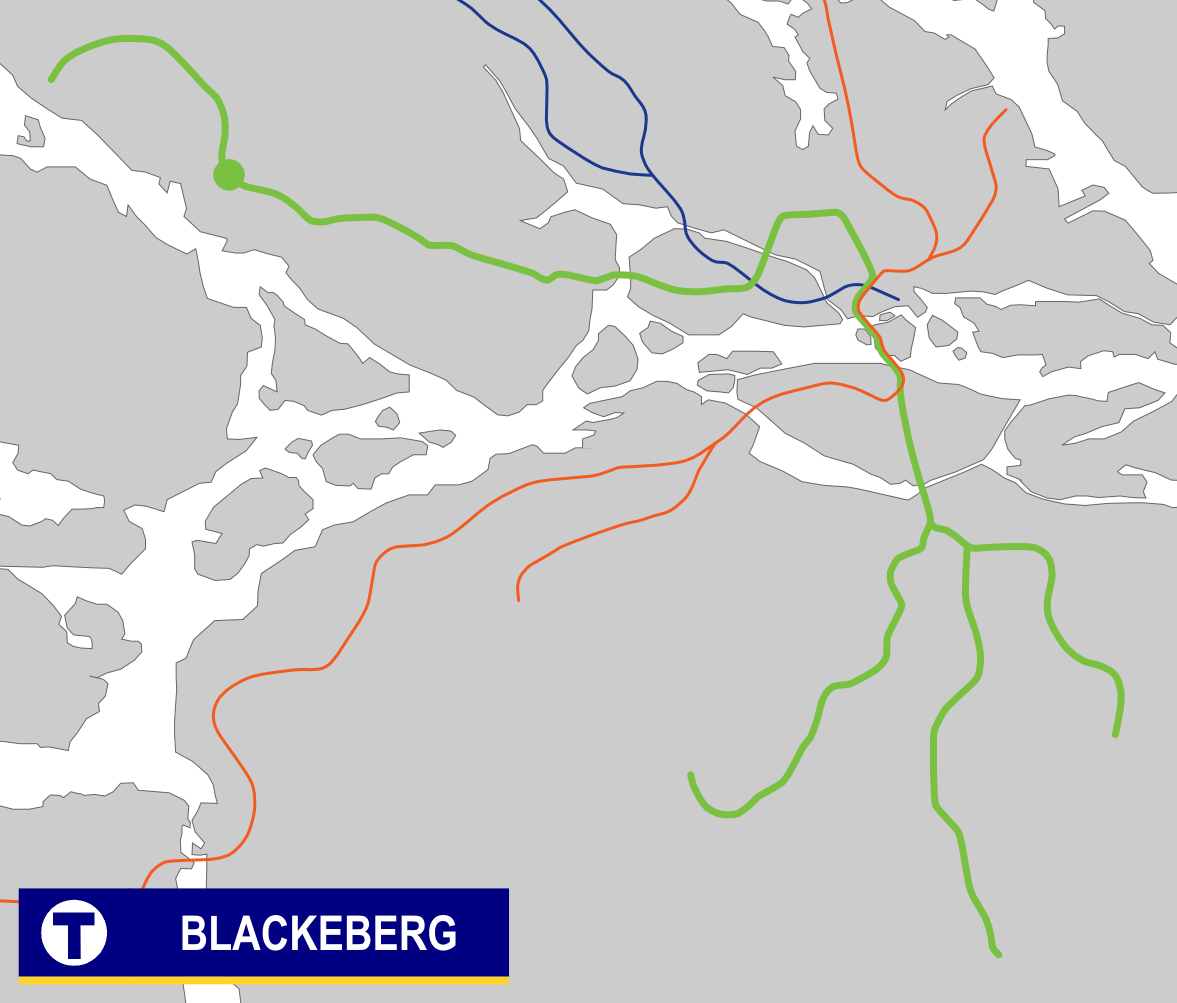

Blackeberg metro station is a station on the Green Line of the Stockholm Metro. It is located in the district of Blackeberg, which is part of the borough of Bromma in the west of the city of Stockholm. The station has a single island platform, with access from a station building spanning the tracks. Two thirds of the platform is located outdoors and one third is located in a rock tunnel under Blackebergsplan. The distance to Slussen is 14.1 km (8.8 mi).

The station was inaugurated on 26 October 1952 as a part of the section of line between Hötorget and Vällingby.

The station building was designed by Peter Celsing, who was head of the architectural office of AB Stockholms Spårvägar, the city owned public transport company. The building stands on the northern side of Blackebergsplan and has entrances from the square and, at a lower level, Vinjegatan. The ticket hall floor is at the Vinjegaten level, and a monumental double staircase leads down from the Blackebergsplan entry. The hall has a square floor plan with 22 metres (72 ft) sides, and its roof is a flat, free-span dome of reinforced concrete, with an untreated surface. The building is blue-rated by the Stockholm City Museum, which means "that the buildings are judged to have extremely high cultural-historical values".

The tunnel section of the station is decorated with green, blue and yellow tiles. As part of Art in the Stockholm metro project, the station received naturalistic paintings on glazed clinker by Ruben Heleander in 1987.

== Gallery ==
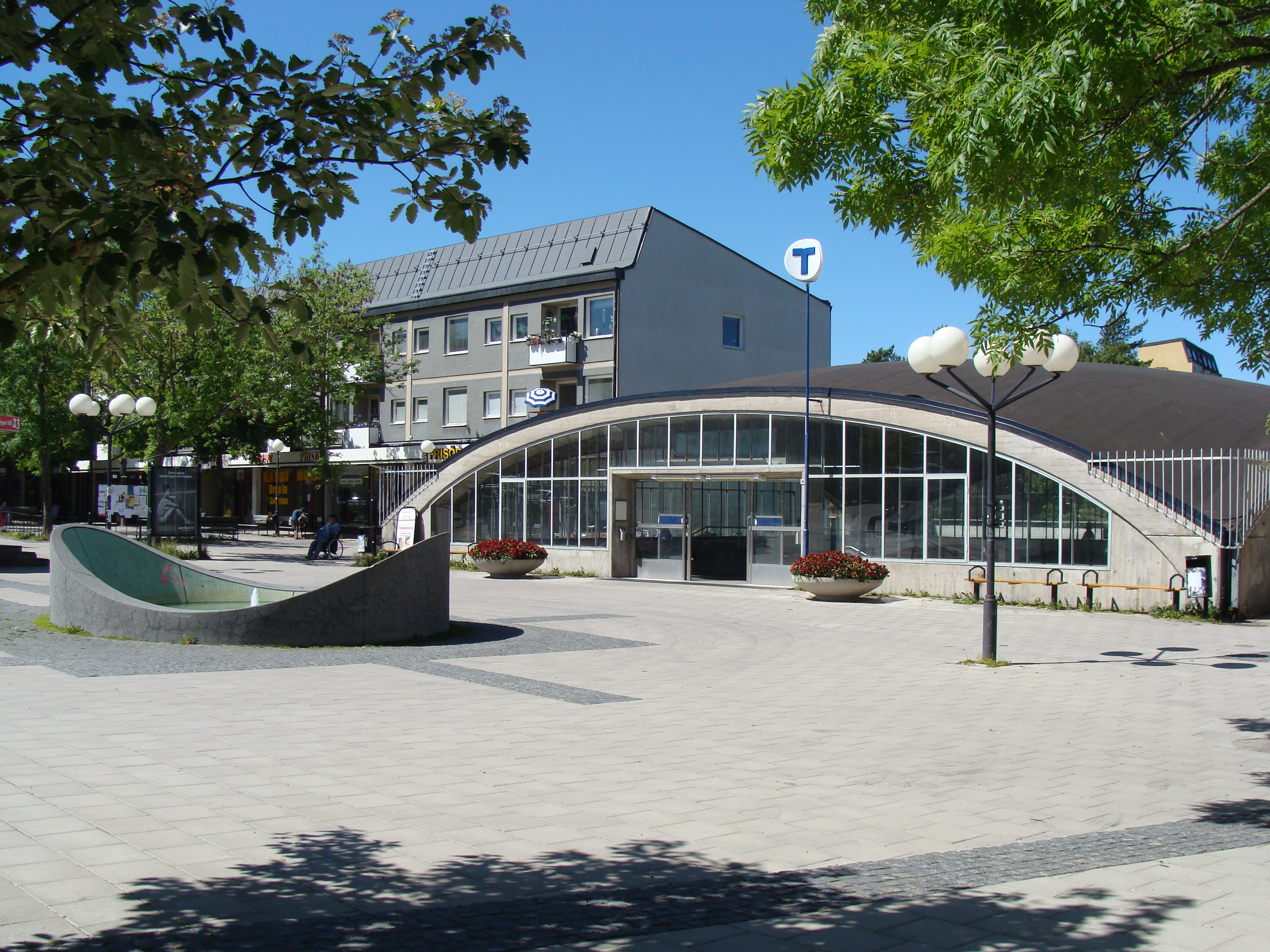
Entrance to station from Blackebergsplan, 2011

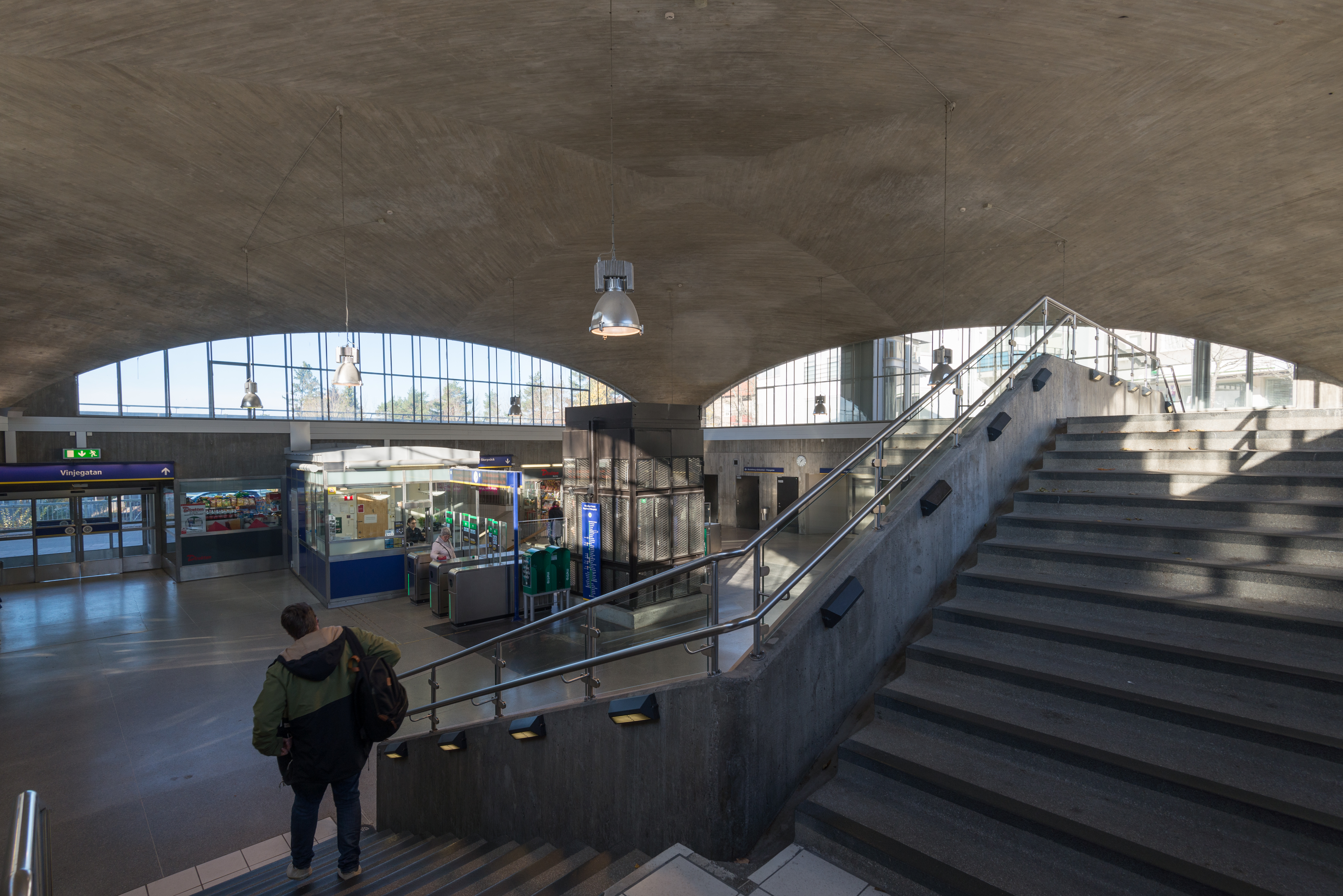
Ticket hall seen from Blackebergsplan stairs, 2016

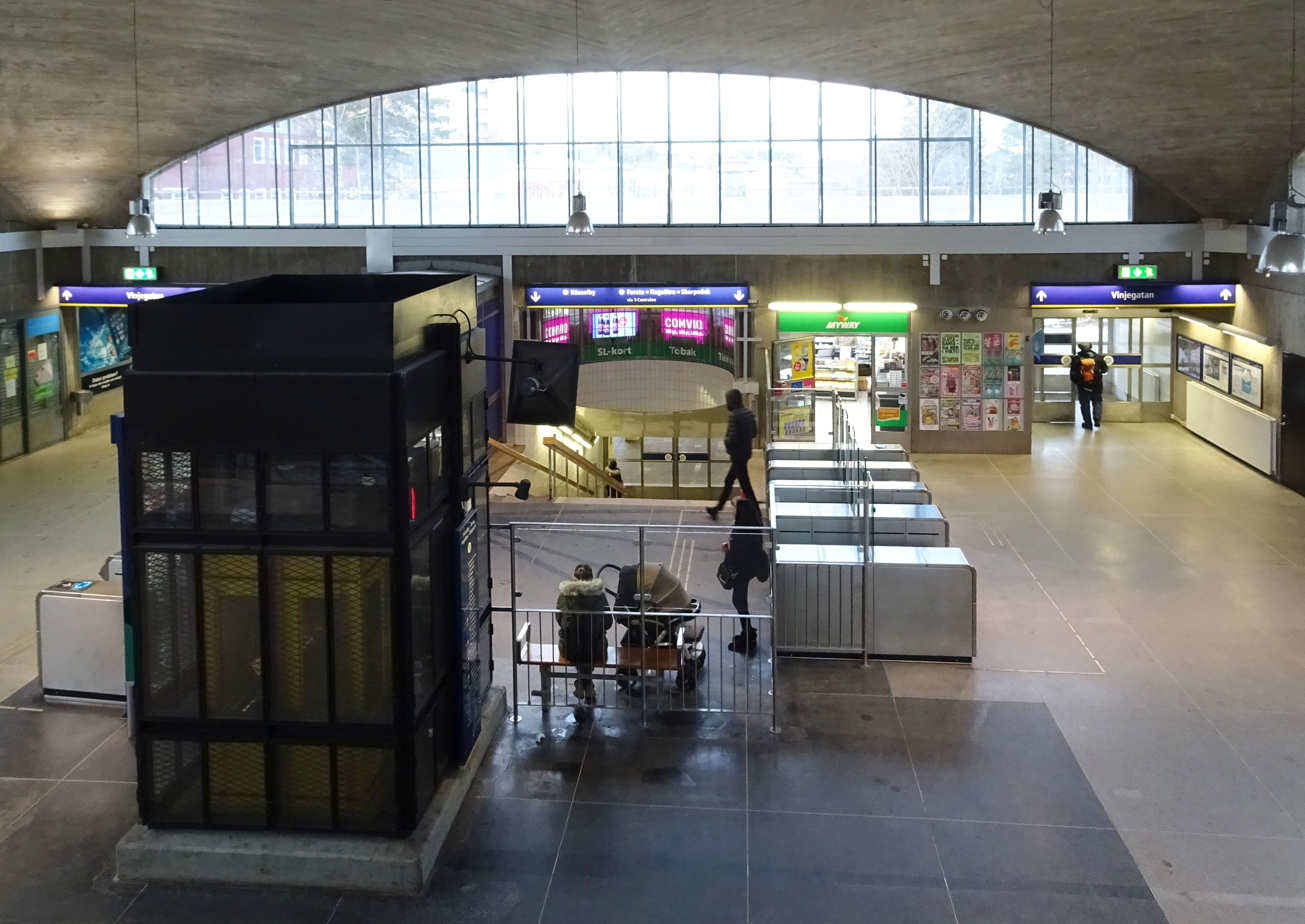
Stairs and lift to platform, 2018

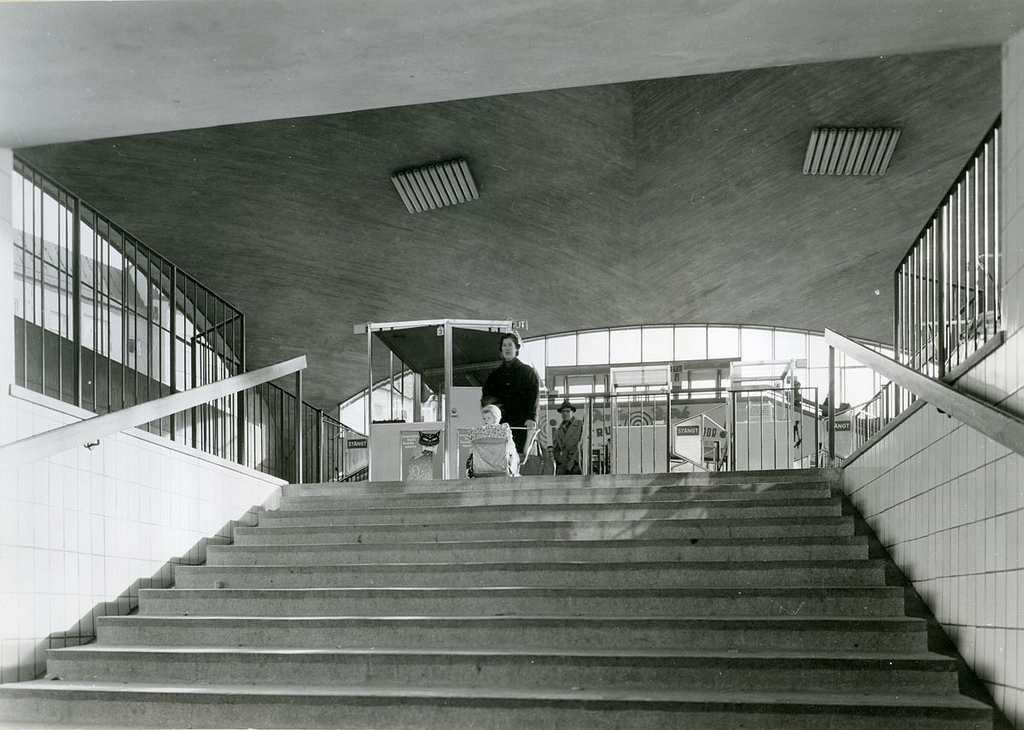
Stairs from platform, date unknown

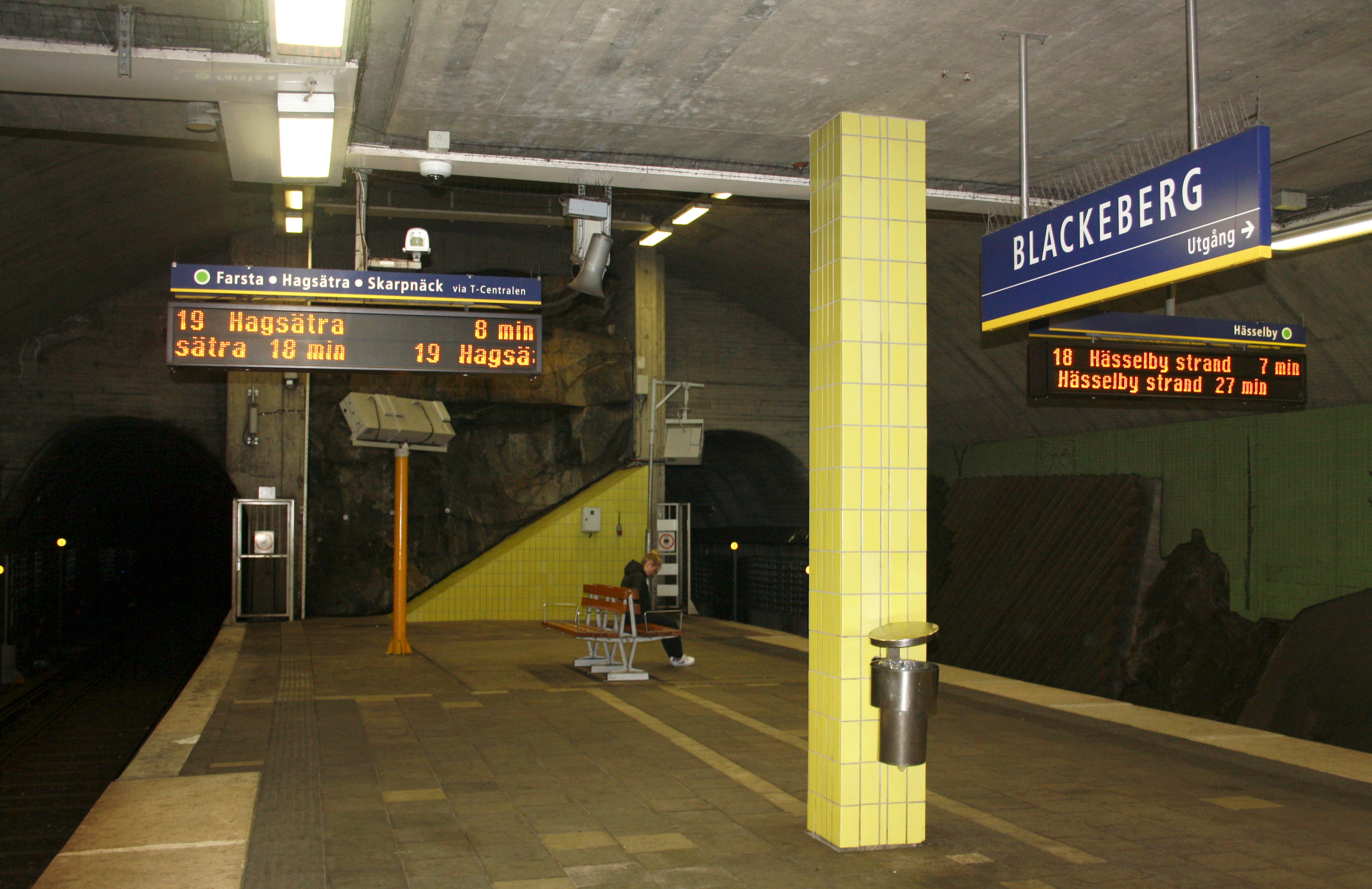
Underground part of platform, 2018
