= Gardini =

Gardini is an Italian surname. Notable people with the surname include:

- Andrea Gardini (born 1965), Italian volleyball player
- Carlos Gardini (1948–2017), Argentine translator and science fiction and fantasy writer
- Davide Gardini (born 1999), Italian volleyball player
- Elisabetta Gardini (born 1956), Italian actress and politician
- Fausto Gardini (1930–2008), Italian tennis player
- Laura Gardini (born 1952), Italian mathematician
- Maria Pia Gardini (1936–2012), Italian entrepreneur and former Scientologist
- Raul Gardini (1933–1993), Italian businessman
- Renato Gardini (1889–1940), Italian wrestler

== See also ==
- Gard (disambiguation)
- Cardini
