= Gaddini =

Gaddini is a surname. Notable people with the surname include:

- Eugenio Gaddini (1916–1985), Italian physician and psychoanalyst
- Rudy Gaddini (born c.1934), American football coach

== See also ==
- Gardini
