= Vällingby metro station =

Stockholm Metro station

Vällingby
- Station platforms, 2026

General information
- Coordinates: 59°21′50″N 17°52′14″E
- System: Stockholm Metro station
- Owner: Storstockholms Lokaltrafik
- Platforms: 2 island platforms
- Tracks: 3

Construction
- Structure type: Elevated
- Accessible: Yes

Other information
- Station code: VBY

History
- Opened: 26 October 1952; 73 years ago

Passengers
- 2019: 12,250 boarding per weekday

Services
Preceding station	Stockholm Metro	Following station
Johannelund towards Hässelby strand	Line 19	Råcksta towards Hagsätra
Location
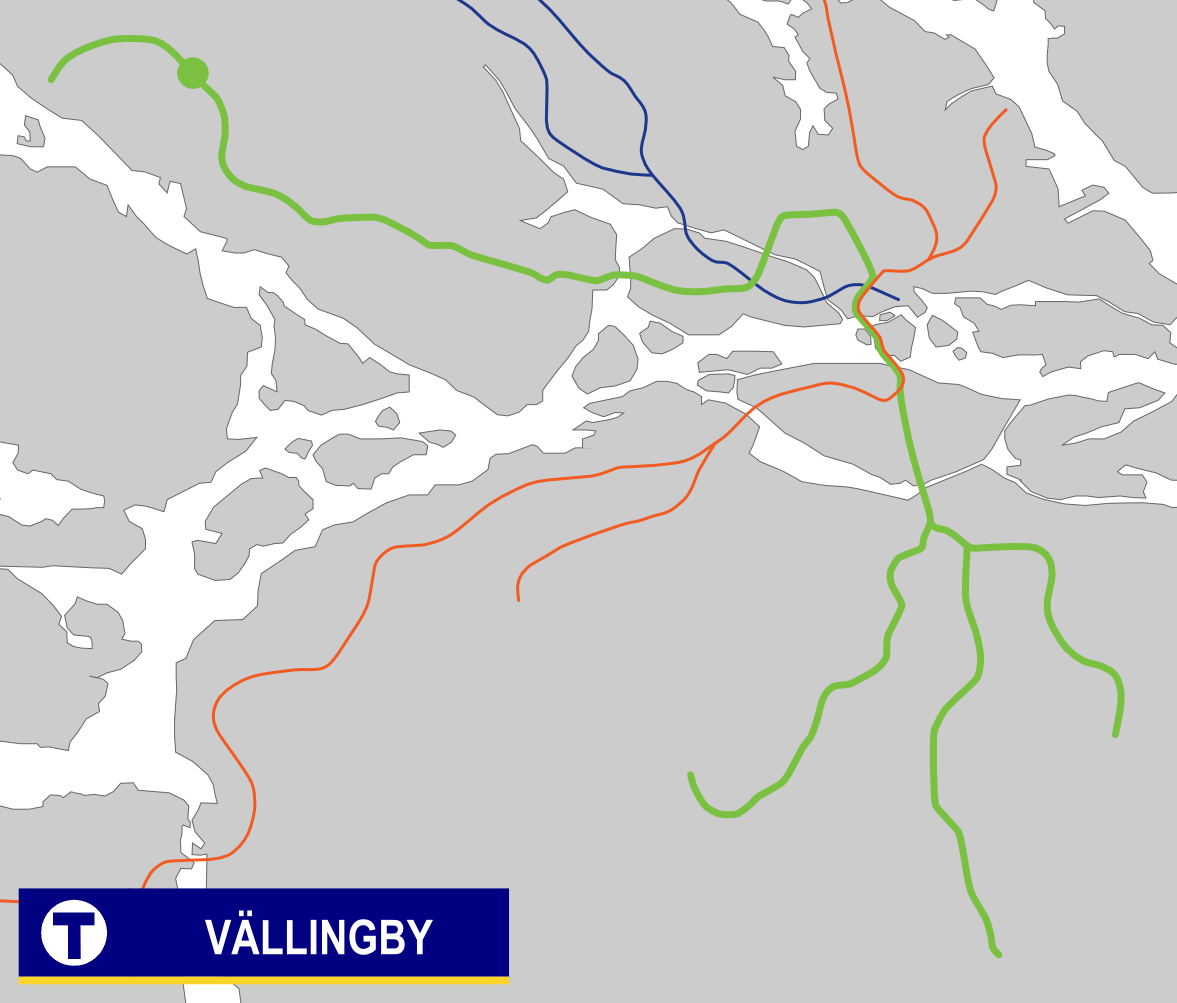

Vällingby is a station on the Green Line of the Stockholm Metro. It is located in the district of Vällingby, which is part of the borough of Hässelby-Vällingby in the west of the city of Stockholm. The station is nominally above ground and has a two island platforms and three through tracks, with access from a station building spanning the tracks. This station building forms part of the cultural and retail centre of Vällingby, much of which has subsequently been built over the tracks and platforms of the metro, giving it an underground feel.

The station was opened on 26 October 1952 as the west terminus of the stretch from Hötorget as provisional station and opened as a permanent station on 6 April 1954. On 1 November 1956 the line was extended further west to Hässelby gård.

As part of Art in the Stockholm Metro project, the station features concrete trees on the platforms, created by Casimir Djuric in 1983.

The Vällingby metro depot (Vällingby t-banedepå) is located to the east of the station and accessed from the station by a grade-separated junction.

== Gallery ==
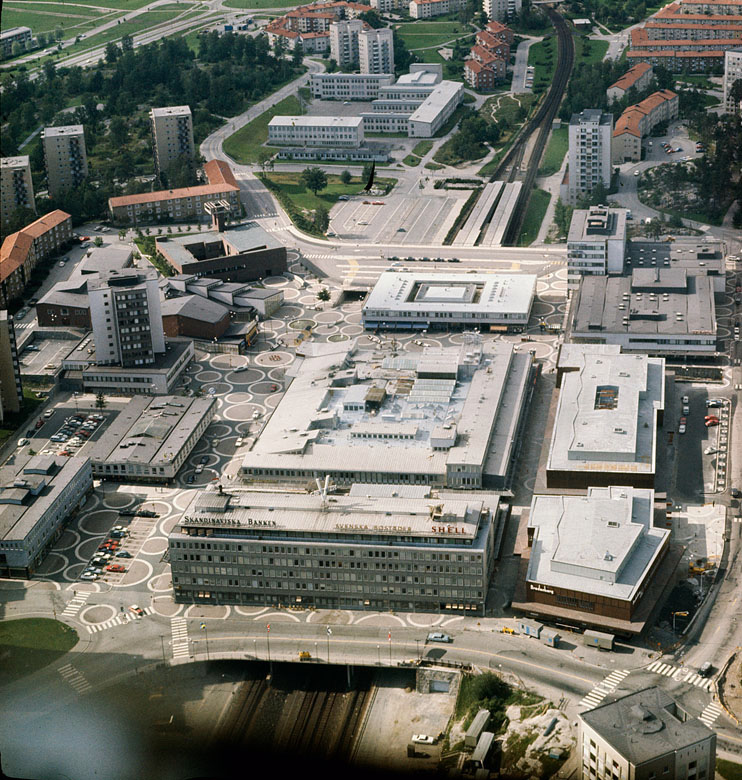
The centre of Vällingby straddling the line, c.1966

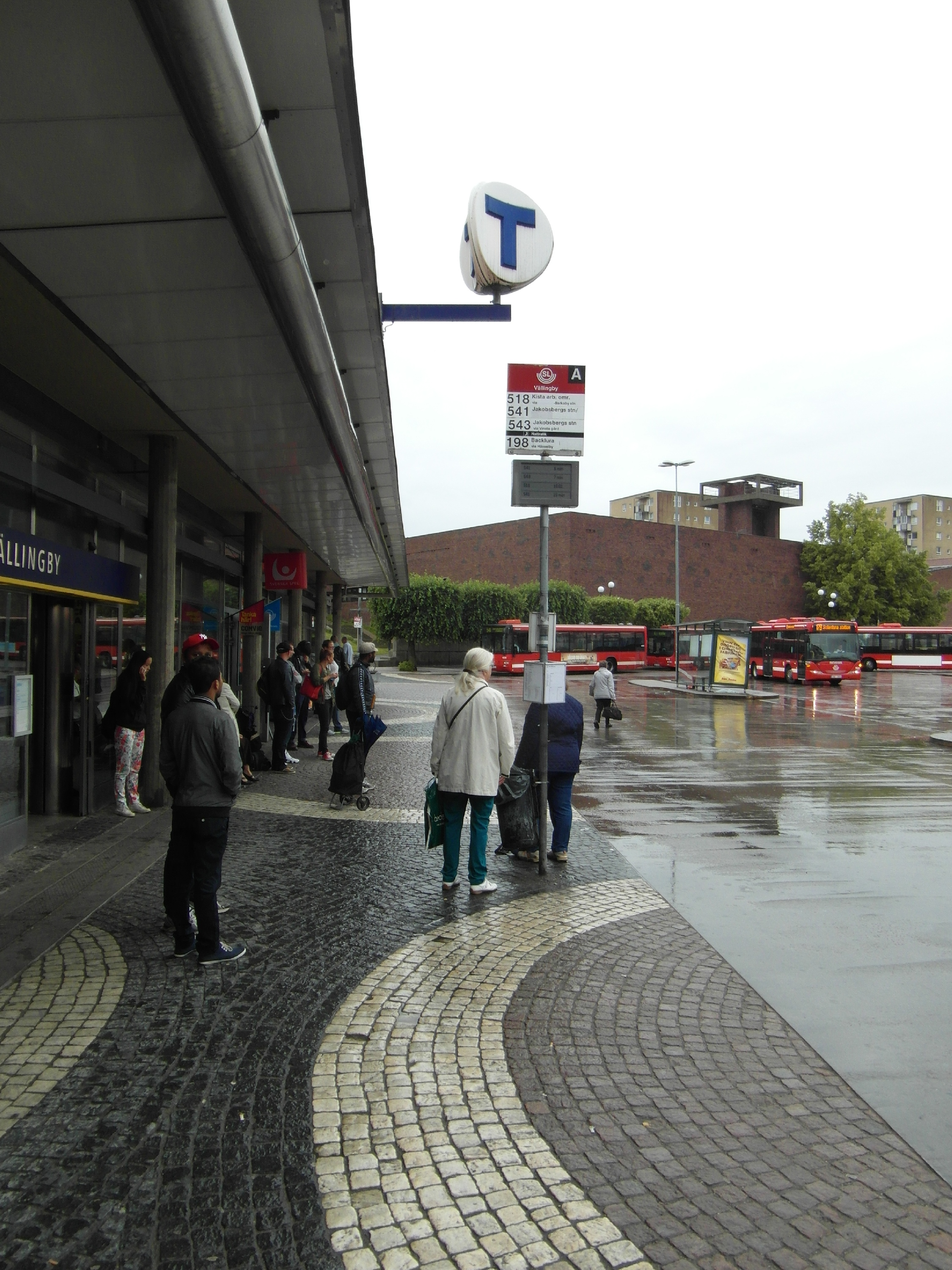
Bus interchange, 2013

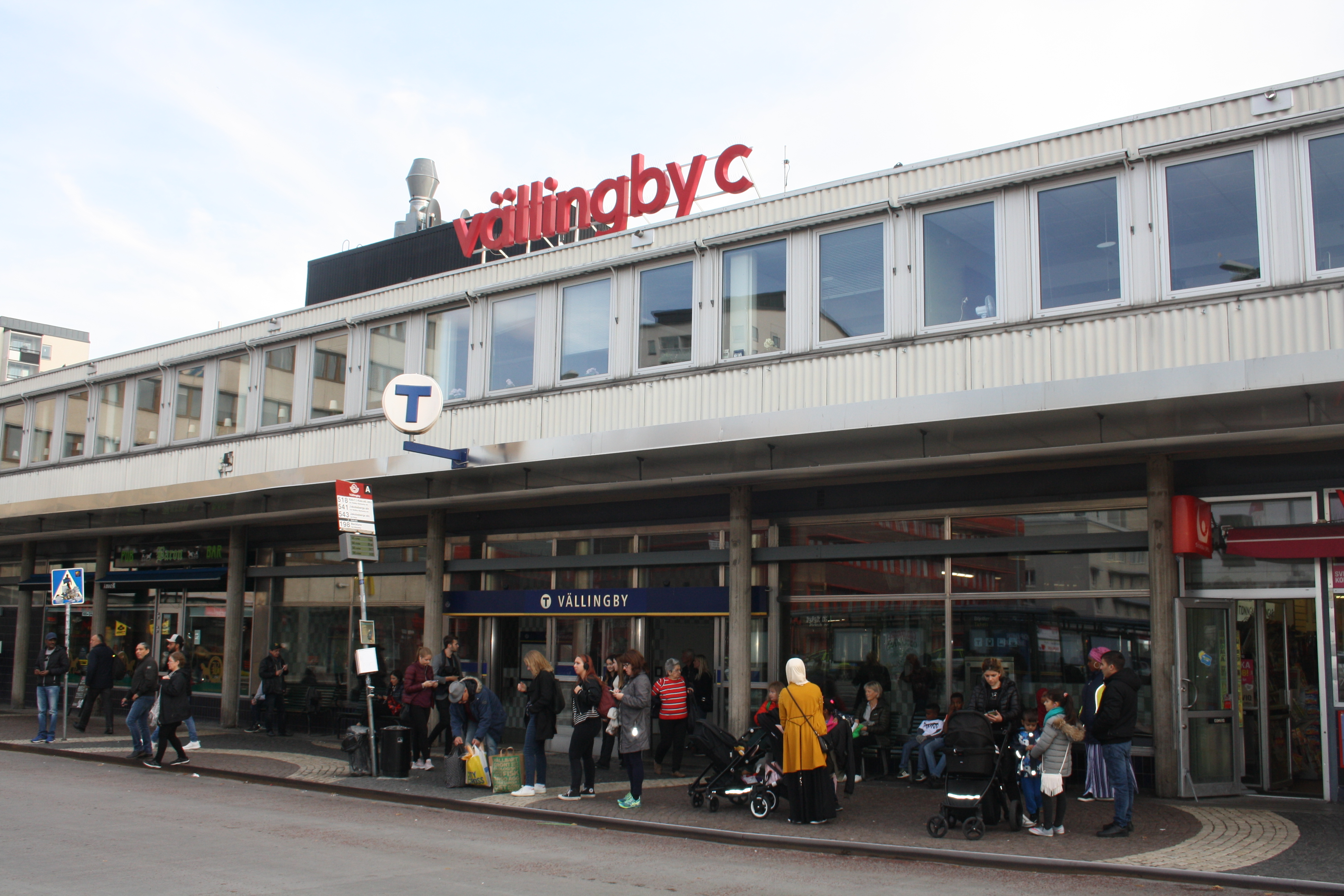
The entrance to the station, 2018

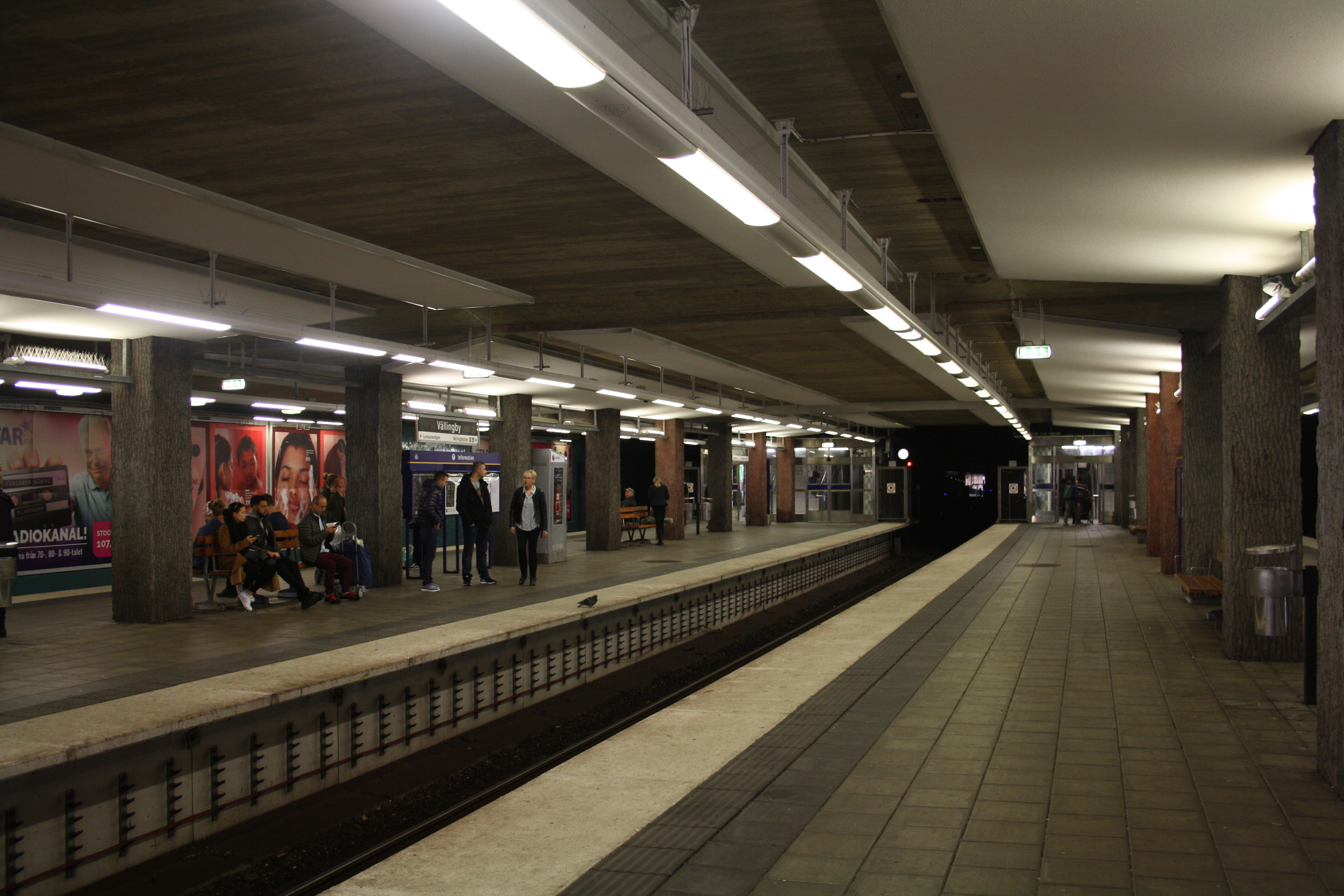
Platforms below buildings in Vällingby centre, 2018
