= Hässelby gård metro station =

Stockholm Metro station

Hässelby gård
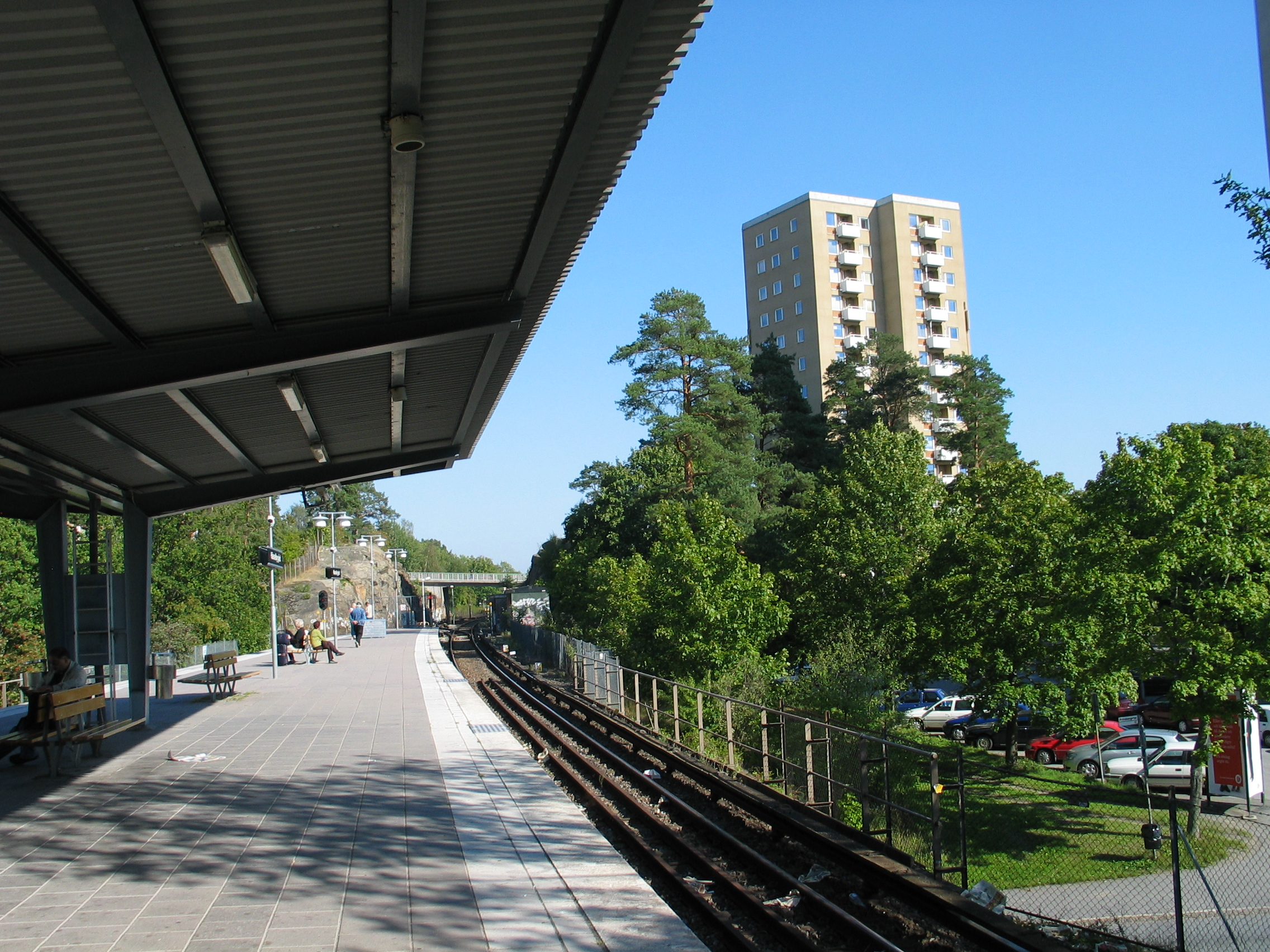
- Station platform, 2006

General information
- Coordinates: 59°22′01″N 17°50′40″E
- System: Stockholm Metro station
- Owner: Storstockholms Lokaltrafik
- Distance: 17.7 km (11.0 mi) from Slussen
- Platforms: 1 island platform
- Tracks: 2

Construction
- Structure type: Elevated
- Accessible: Yes

Other information
- Station code: HÄG

History
- Opened: 1 November 1956; 69 years ago

Passengers
- 2019: 5,800 boarding per weekday

Services
Preceding station	Stockholm Metro	Following station
Hässelby strand Terminus	Line 19	Johannelund towards Hagsätra
Location
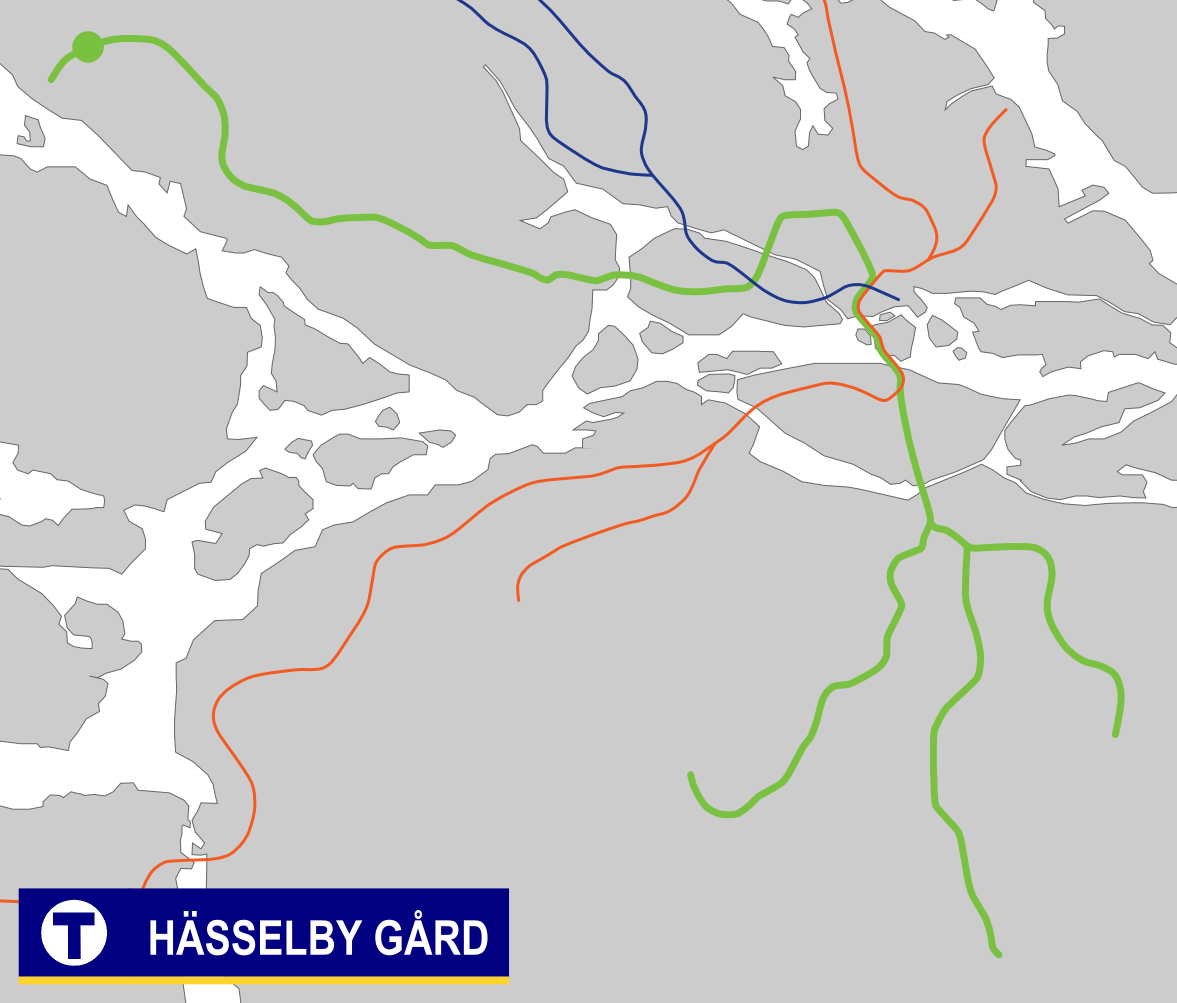

Hässelby gård metro station is a station on the Green Line of the Stockholm Metro. It is located in the district of Hässelby gård, which is part of the borough of Hässelby-Vällingby in the west of the city of Stockholm. The station is elevated and has a single island platform, with access from a lower level station building on Hässelby torg. The distance to Slussen is 17.7 km (11.0 mi).

A temporary station at Hässelby gård was inaugurated on 1 November 1956 as the western end of an extension from Vällingby. This was replaced by the current station on 15 October 1958, and on the 18th of the following month the line was extended further west to Hässelby strand. The station was renovated in 2011.

== Gallery ==
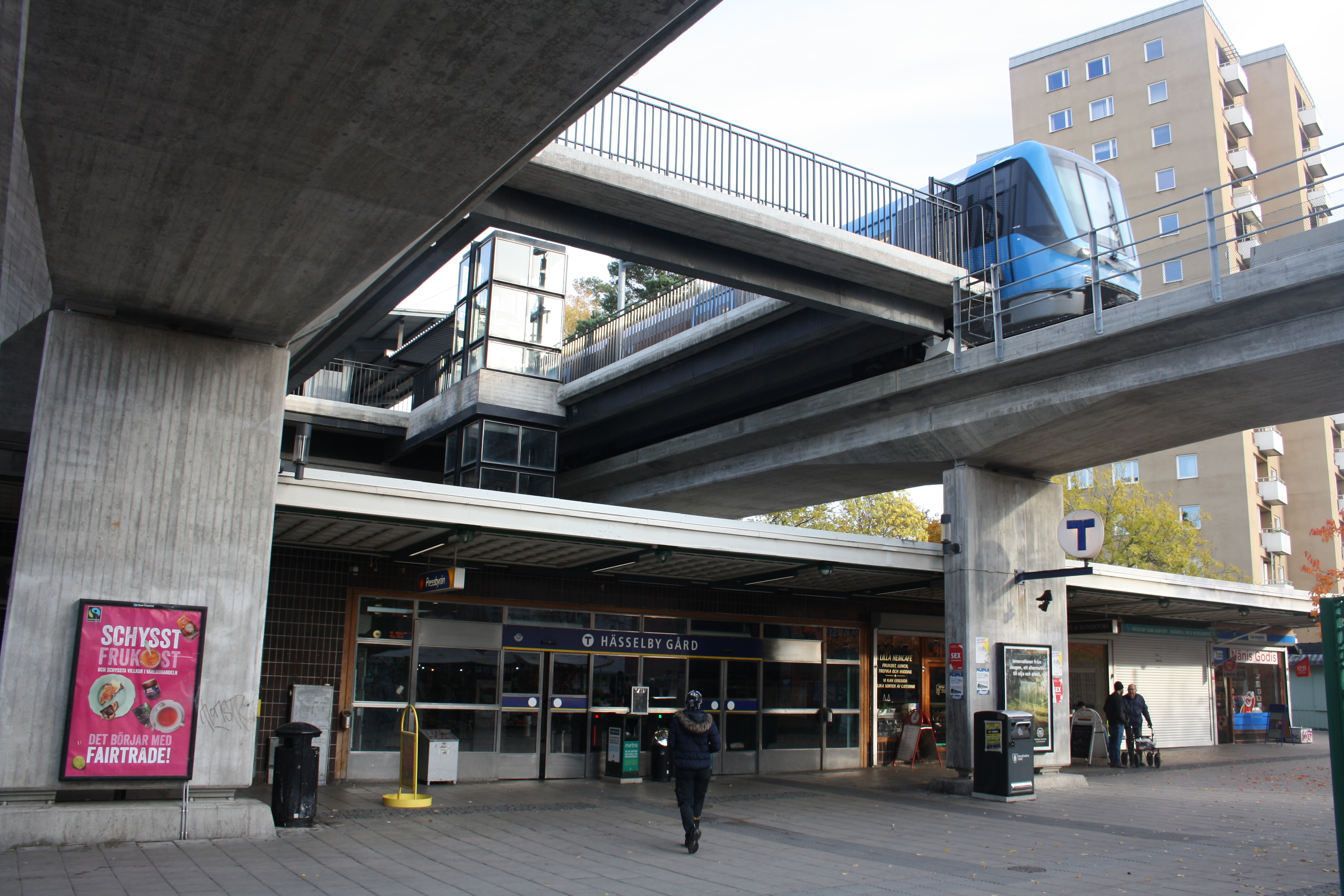
Entrance to station, 2018

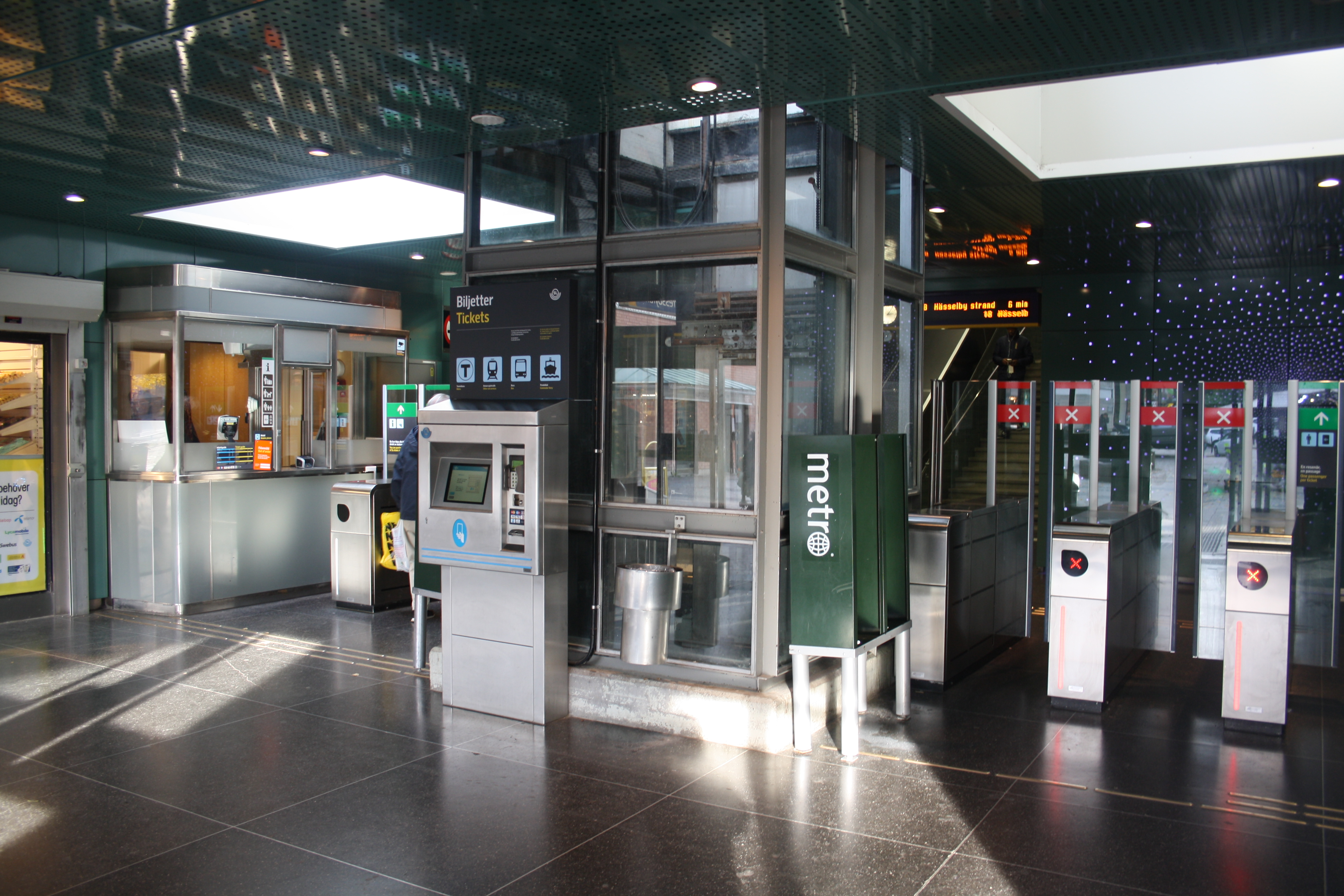
Inside the station building, 2018

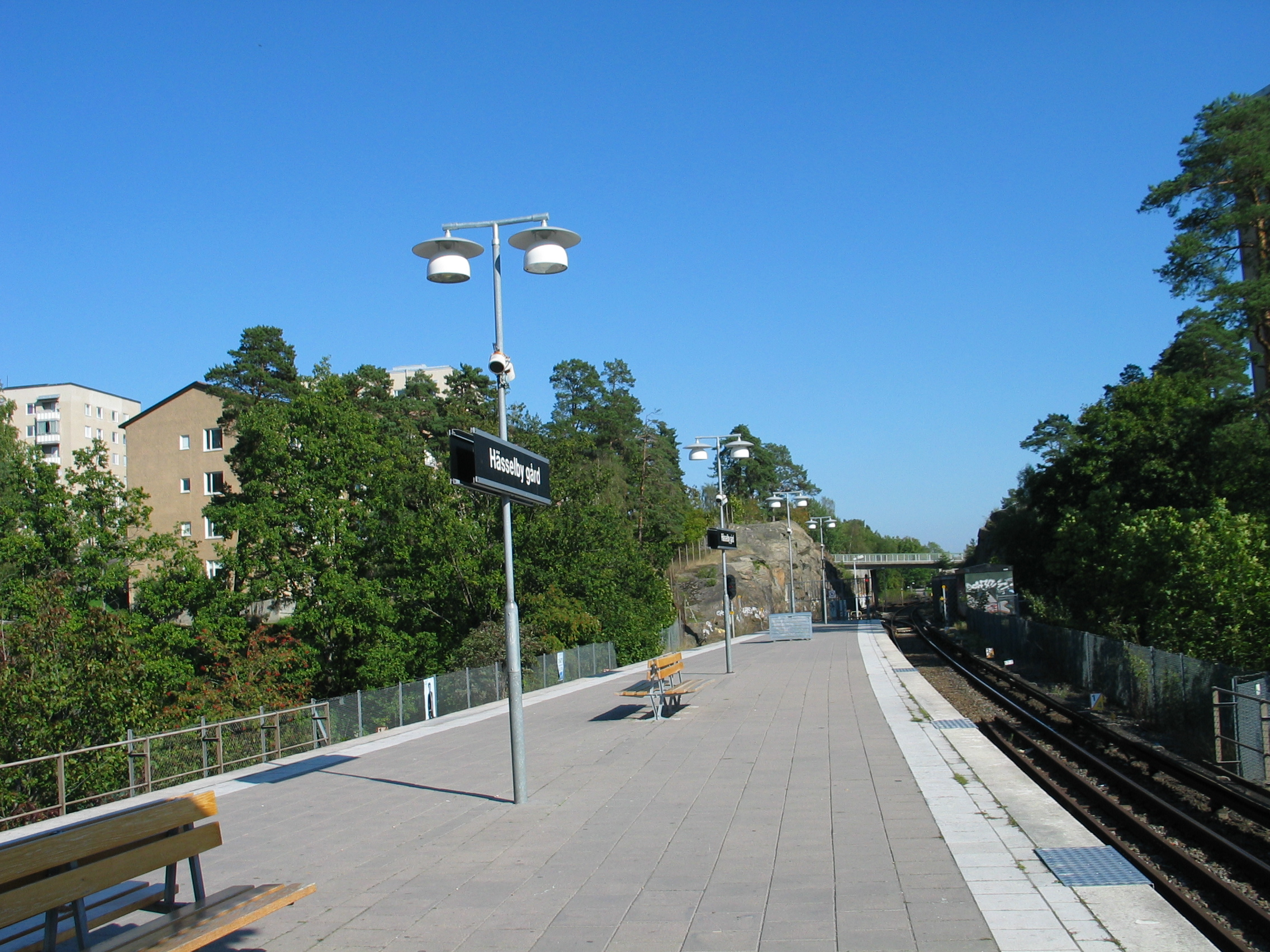
Eastern end of station, 2006
