= GART =

Gart or GART may refer to:

== People ==
- Joseph Gart (fl. 15th century), Provençal Jewish poet
- Gart Westerhout (1927–2012), Dutch astronomer
- Gart, a character in Robot and Monster

== Other ==
- General Authority for Radio and Television, the state-run Syrian broadcasting corporation, formerly known as ORTAS
- Graphics address remapping table, a memory structure part of the Accelerated Graphics Port specification
- Groupement des autorités responsables de transport, a French trade association for public transport providers
- The Great American Road Trip, a reality television series on NBC
- GAR transformylase, a symbol for the enzyme phosphoribosylglycinamide formyltransferase
- GART (gene), an encoding of the enzyme trifunctional purine biosynthetic protein adenosine-3
