= Dugard =

Dugard is an English surname, probably coming from the French dieu (te) garde (God protect you), via the surnames Dieutegarde, Deugard and du Gard. People with the surname include:

- Jaycee Dugard (born 1980), 1991 American kidnapping victim
- John Dugard (born 1936), South African professor of international law
- Martin Dugard (author) (born 1961), American author
- Martin Dugard (speedway rider) (born 1969), former British motorcycle speedway rider
- Robert Dugard (1942–2018), English motorcycle speedway rider and promoter
- William Dugard (1606–1662), English schoolmaster and printer

== See also ==
- Gard (disambiguation)
