= Hässelby gård =

Coordinates: 59°22′01″N 17°50′40″E

Hässelby Gård is a suburban district belonging to the Hässelby-Vällingby borough in Stockholm, Sweden. The district had a population of 8,620 in 2005. Hässelby Gård metro station (Hässelby gårds tunnelbanestation) is on the Green Line of the Stockholm Metro. The station was inaugurated in 1956 as the west terminus of the extension from Vällingby. In November 1958 the line was extended further west to Hässelby strand.

== See also ==
- Hässelby Castle
- Hässelby gård metro station
