= Gard (Slavic toponymy) =

Slavic term for town

Gard is a Slavic term for "town", "city" or "castle." It is of Pomeranian origin and is in use in the contemporary Kashubian language. It has survived in a number of Pomeranian geographical names. See the article "Gord" for similar toponymic suffixes.

Examples are:

- Stargard in West Pomerania
- Starogard Gdański in Eastern Pomerania
- Nowogard in West Pomerania
- Białogard in West Pomerania
