= Carlos Gardini =

Argentinian journalist

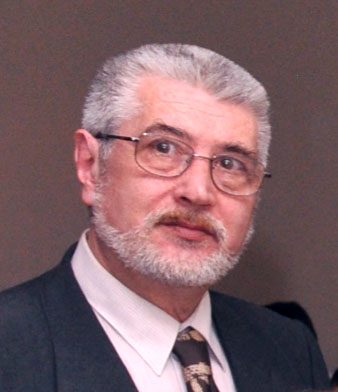
- Born: August 26, 1948; Buenos Aires, Argentina
- Died: March 1, 2017 (aged 68)
- Education: University of Buenos Aires
- Occupation(s): Author, translator

Carlos Gardini (August 26, 1948 – March 1, 2017) was an Argentine translator and science fiction and fantasy writer. During his lifetime, he was one of the most productive and well known Argentine writers within the science fiction genre.

== Education ==
Gardini studied at the University of Buenos Aires. In 1986, Gardini received a Fulbright scholarship to participate in the International Writing Program at the University of Iowa.

== Career ==
=== Writings ===
Gardini's writing took off with his 1982 writing, "Primera línea" (front line). The short story, influenced by the events of the contemporaneous Falklands War, received the Premio Círculo de Lectores (Writers Circle prize) from a panel of judges including Jorge Luis Borges and José Donoso. In 1991, Gardini digitally published the novel El Libro de la Tierra Negra, which went on to win the 1991 Axxón Prize, and the 1992 Más Allá Prize awarded by the Argentine Science Fiction and Fantasy Circle. The novel has since been republished in print. In 1996, Gardini won the Premio UPC for his novel Los Ojos de un Dios en celo (The Eyes of a God in Heat).

=== Translations ===
Gardini published Spanish translations of a number of English language works by both contemporary and classical authors including Isaac Asimov, J. G. Ballard, John Steinbeck, Kurt Vonnegut and William Shakespeare. Gardini has been noted for his role in making English language science fiction works more available to the Spanish speaking public.

== Works ==
- Primera línea (1982)
- Mi cerebro animal (Minotauro, 1983)
- Primera línea (collection) (Editorial Sudamericana, 1983)
- Sinfonía Cero (Riesa, 1984)
- Juegos malabares (Minotauro, 1984)
- Cuentos de Vendavalia (1988)
- El libro de la Tierra Negra (Axxón, 1993)
- Cuentos de Vendavalia / Vendavalia Tales (Random House Mondadori, 2004)
- Sobre la fotografía (translated from Susan Sontag's On Photography) (Alfaguara, 2005)
