= Hässelby Palace =

Mansion in Hässelby, Stockholm, Sweden

Coordinates: 59°21′56″N 17°51′16″E

Hässelby slott
- Stockholm Municipality, Sweden
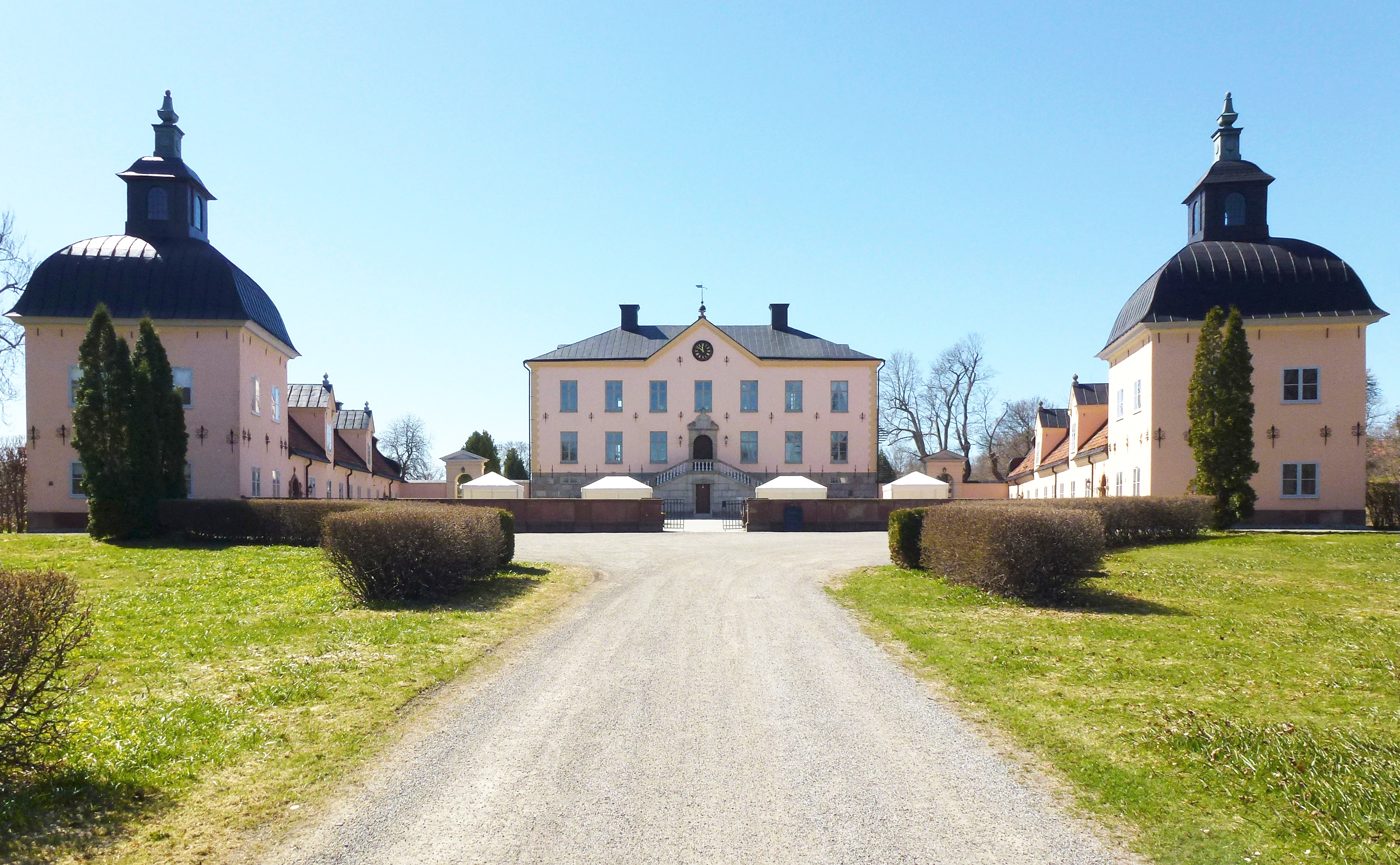

Hässelby Palace (Hässelby slott) is a former manor located in Hässelby gård in the west part of Stockholm Municipality, Sweden. Since 2010 it has frequently been available for weddings, parties and conferences.

== History ==
Gustaf Bonde (1620–1667) began to build Hässelby in the 1640s. His son Karl Bonde (1648–1699) owned it until his death 1652. The main building is on two floors along with two wings with the towered higher pavilions. It was designed by architect Simon de la Vallée (1590–1642) and was finished about the 1660s by his son Jean de la Vallée (ca. 1620– 1696) when Gustaf Bonde owned the manor. At the beginning of the 18th century, the Baroque garden was also laid out. The Bonde noble family owned the estate until 1931, when the City of Stockholm purchased it and had the manor renovated in the early 1960s.

== See also ==
- List of castles and palaces in Sweden
