= Hässelby strand =

Urban district in Stockholm, Sweden

- Stadsdelar
- Location within Stockholm Municipality Location within Stockholm Location within Sweden
- Coordinates: 59°21′44″N 17°49′57″E
- Country: Sweden
- Province: Uppland
- City: Stockholm
- District: Hässelby-Vällingby

Hässelby strand is a Stadsdelar within the district of Hässelby-Vällingby in the west of Stockholm, Sweden. It lies on the shores of Lake Mälaren.

The district is served by Green Line of the Stockholm Metro.
