= Råcksta =

Urban district in Stockholm, Sweden

Coordinates: 59°21′34.81″N 17°53′12.11″E

Råcksta is a district of Västerort, Stockholm, in Hässelby-Vällingby. It is next to the suburbs of Grimsta, Vällingby, Nälsta, Flysta, Beckomberga, Norra Ängby and Blackeberg. It had 4,484 inhabitants in 2005 and is 1.42 km^{2}.

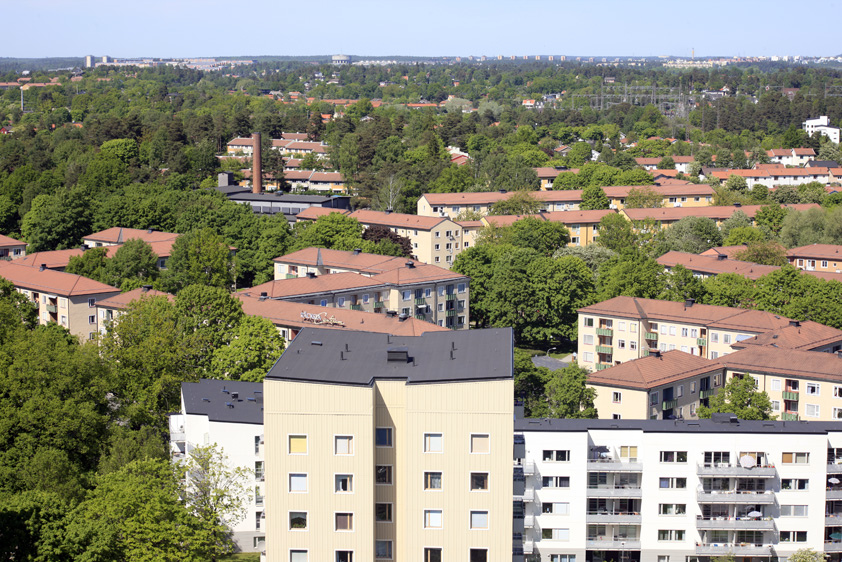
