= Joseph Gart =

Provençal Jewish liturgical poet and commentator

Joseph Gart (Hebrew: יוסף גרט) was a Provençal Jewish liturgical poet and commentator, who likely lived at Aix in the fifteenth century.

The surname is, according to Neubauer, the equivalent of the Hebrew "Shomroni," borne by the Gard family of Avignon (to which Joseph belonged) in addition to their Provençal surname, "Gart." Two literary productions of Gart are still extant in manuscript, a liturgical poem for Rosh Hashanah, and a commentary on the liturgies for the Four Sabbaths.
