= Hässelby-Vällingby =

- Borough of Stockholm
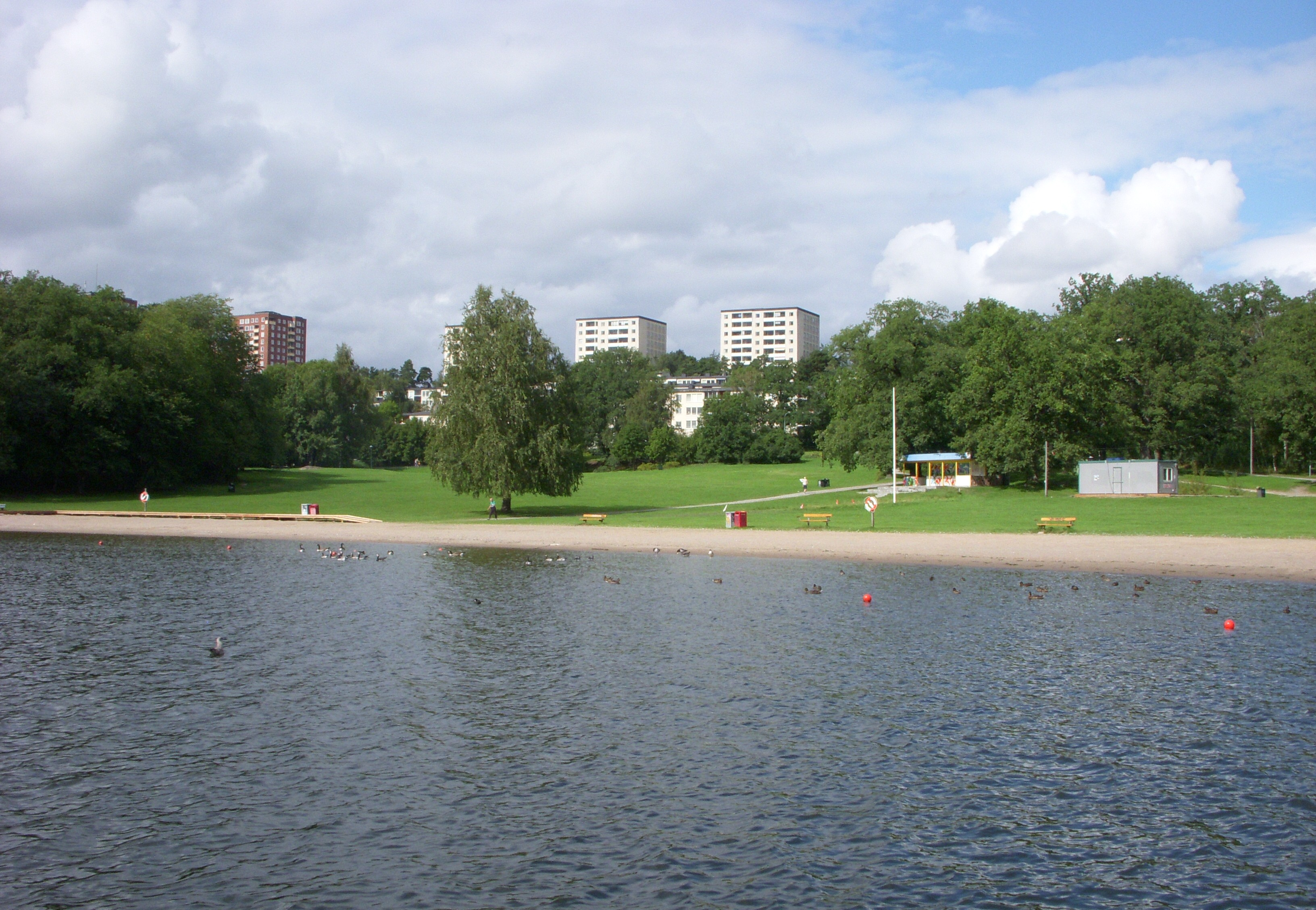
- View of Hässelby Strand

- Location of Hässelby-Vällingby within Stockholm Municipality shown in yellow
- Coordinates: 59°21′45″N 17°52′20″E
- Country: Sweden
- Municipality: Stockholm Municipality
- Municipality subdivision: Västerort
- Established: 1998

Government
  - Type: Municipal assembly
  - Municipal commissioner: Fredrik Bojerud (C)
- Area: 19.60 km^{2} (7.57 sq mi)
- Population (2014): 71,042
  - Density: 3,625/km^{2} (9,388/sq mi)
- Time zone: UTC+1 (CET)
  - Summer (DST): UTC+2 (CEST)
- Postal code: 114 --, 162 --, 163 --, 165 --
- Area code: 08
- Website: Stockholm.se

Hässelby-Vällingby is a borough (stadsdelsområde) in the western part of Stockholm, Sweden. It is primarily made up of Hässelby (Gård, Strand, Villastad) and Vällingby. The other districts that make up the borough are Backlura, Kälvesta, Nälsta, Råcksta and Vinsta. As of 2014, the population is 71,042 in an area of 19.60 km^{2} (7.57 sq mi), which gives a density of 3,624.59/km^{2} (9,387.6/sq mi).

The name is taken from Hässelby Castle (Hesselby Slott) which included large areas within the present three districts. The port of Hässelby also includes parts of Vinsta. The castle is located in the present district of Hässelby Gård but in the postcode of Vällingby.
