= Hässelby strand metro station =

Stockholm Metro station

Hässelby strand
- Station platform, 2026

General information
- Coordinates: 59°21′42″N 17°49′57″E
- System: Stockholm Metro station
- Owner: Storstockholms Lokaltrafik
- Platforms: 1 island platform
- Tracks: 3

Construction
- Structure type: At grade
- Accessible: Yes

Other information
- Station code: HÄS

History
- Opened: 18 November 1958; 67 years ago

Passengers
- 2019: 4,300 boarding per weekday

Services
Preceding station	Stockholm Metro	Following station
Terminus	Line 19	Hässelby gård towards Hagsätra
Location
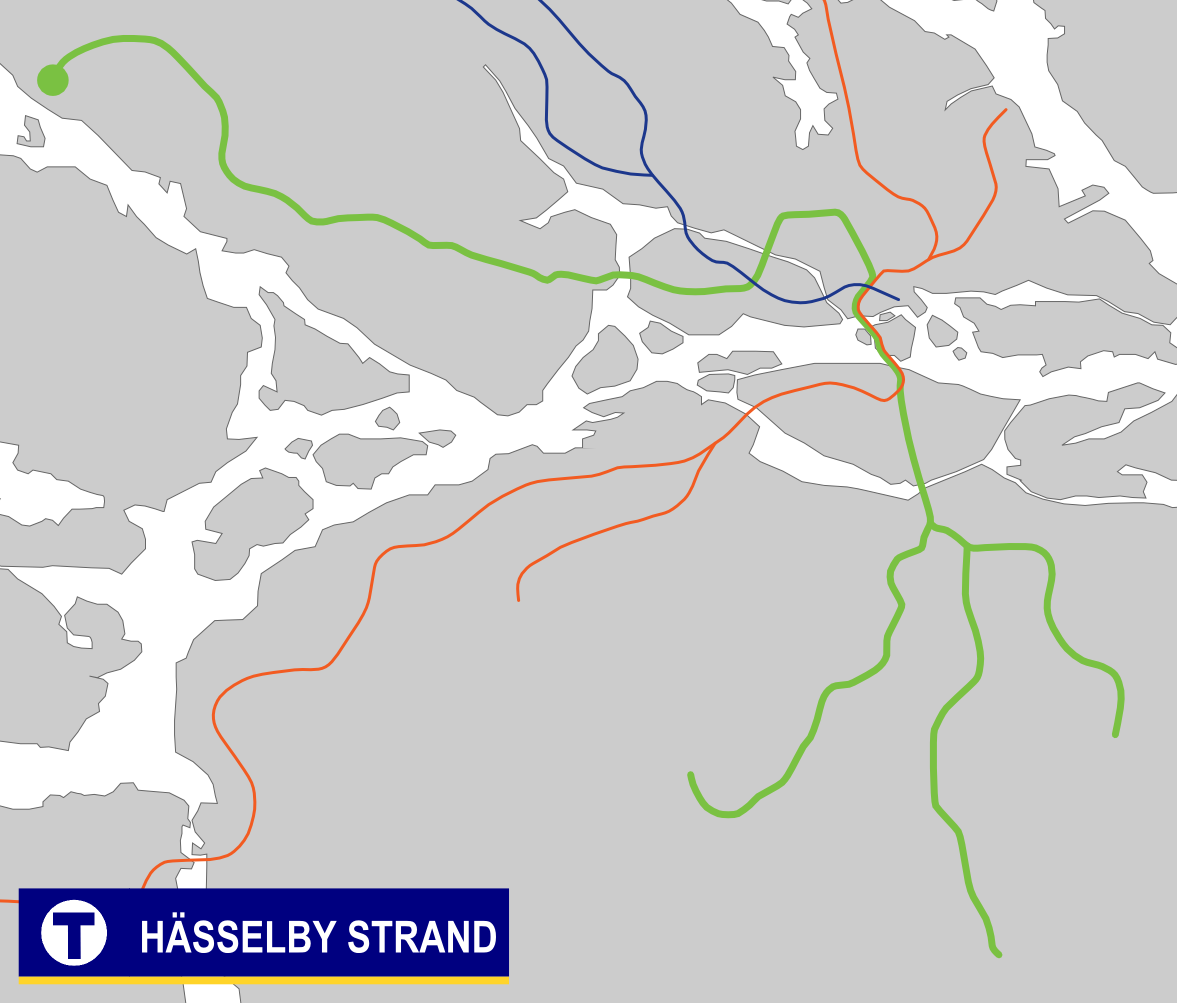

Hässelby strand metro station is the western terminus of the Green Line of the Stockholm Metro. It is located in the district of Hässelby strand, which is part of the borough of Hässelby-Vällingby in the west of the city of Stockholm. The station is at ground level and has a single island platform, with two terminal platform tracks and a siding. Access is from Fyrspannsgatan through a building across the end of the platform that also includes shops and apartments. The distance to Slussen is 18.6 km (11.6 mi).

The station was inaugurated on 18 November 1958 as the western end of an extension from Hässelby gård. As part of a redevelopment of the centre of Hässelby strand, the original single-storey station building was closed and demolished in 2013, being initially replaced by a temporary building on a different site. This in turn was replaced in 2015 by the new multi-storey building, with shops and apartments, on the site of the original building.

As part of Art in the Stockholm Metro project, the access route from the station building to the platforms was decorated in 2000 with a tile mosaic by artist Christian Partos entitled Teleportings. These survived the 2015 rebuilding.

== Gallery ==
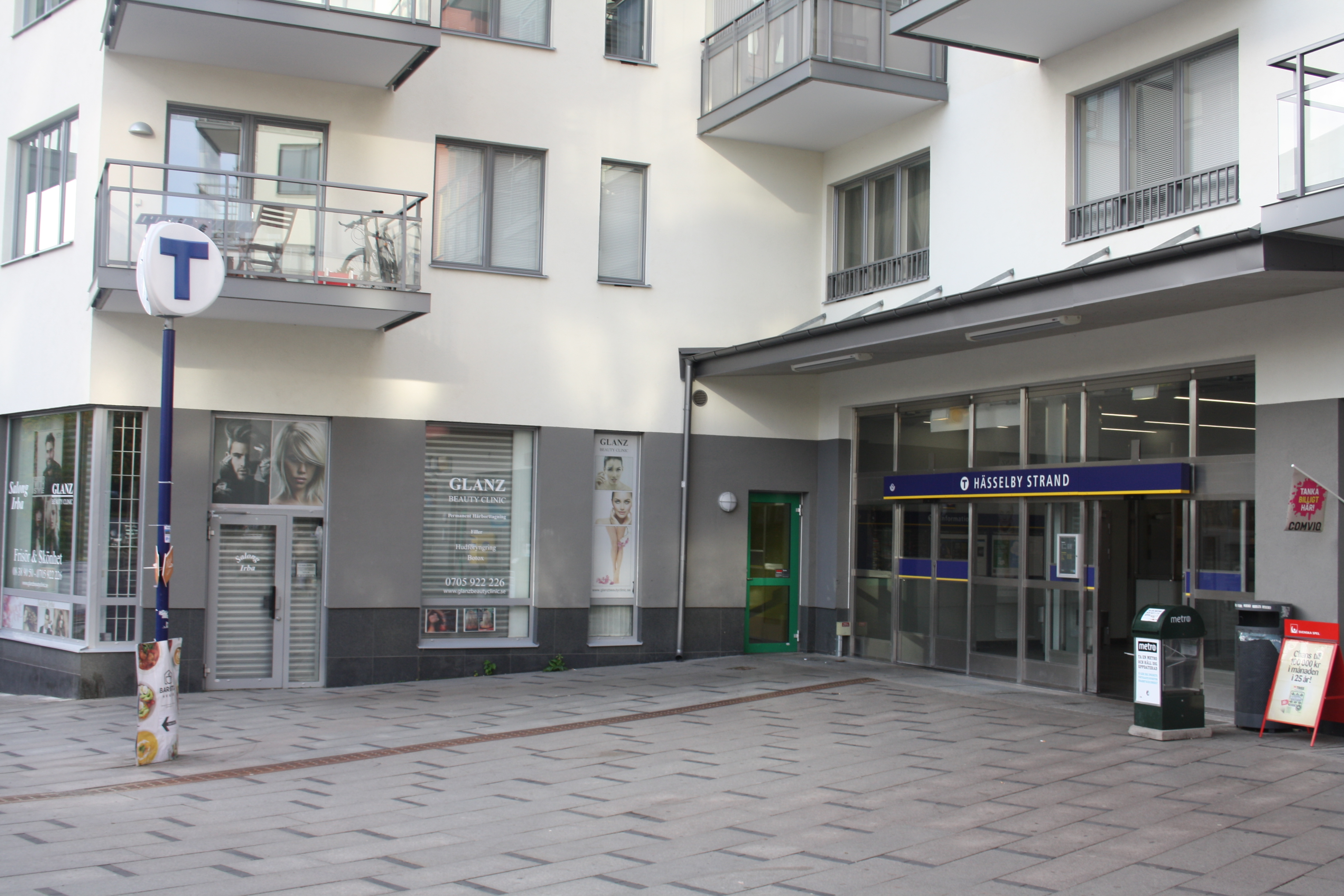
Station entrance, 2018

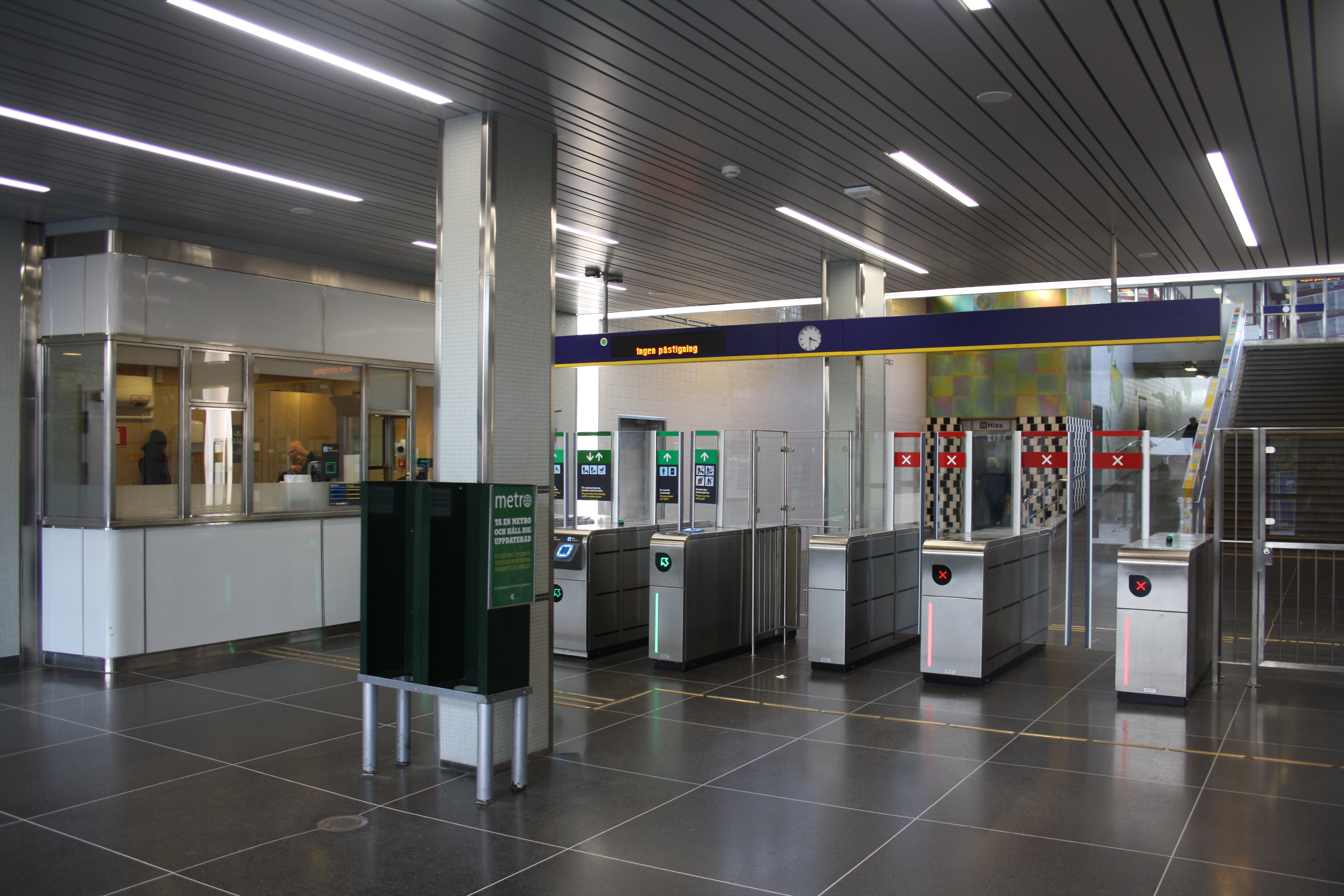
Inside the station building, 2018

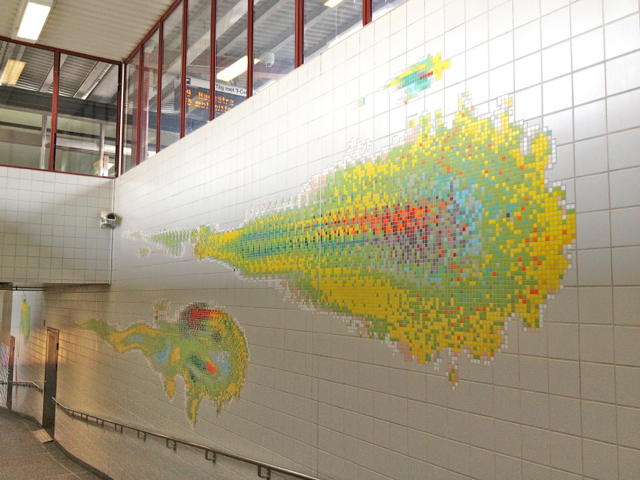
Teleportings, 2014

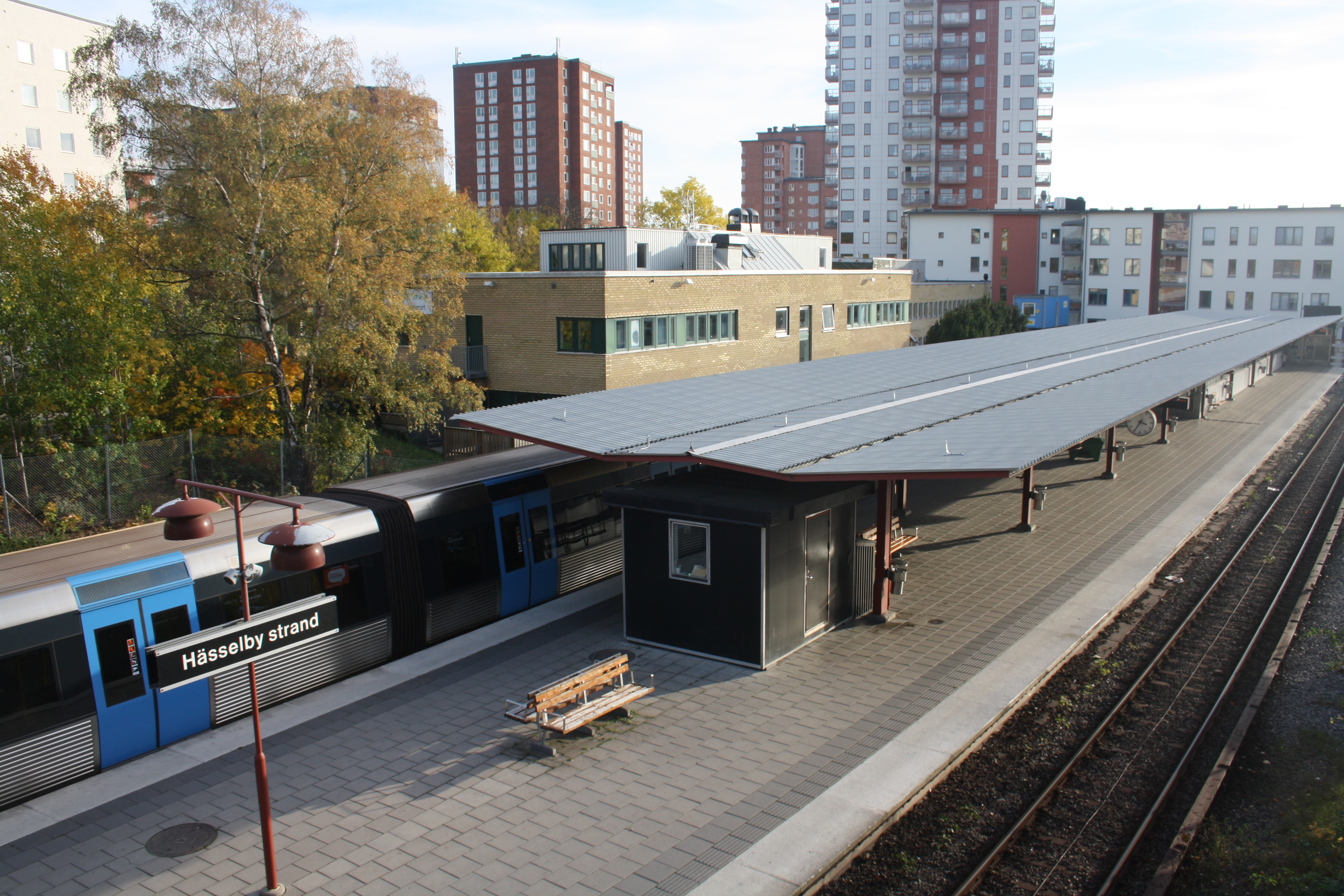
View towards end of line, 2018
