= Råcksta Träsk =

Lake in Stockholm, Sweden

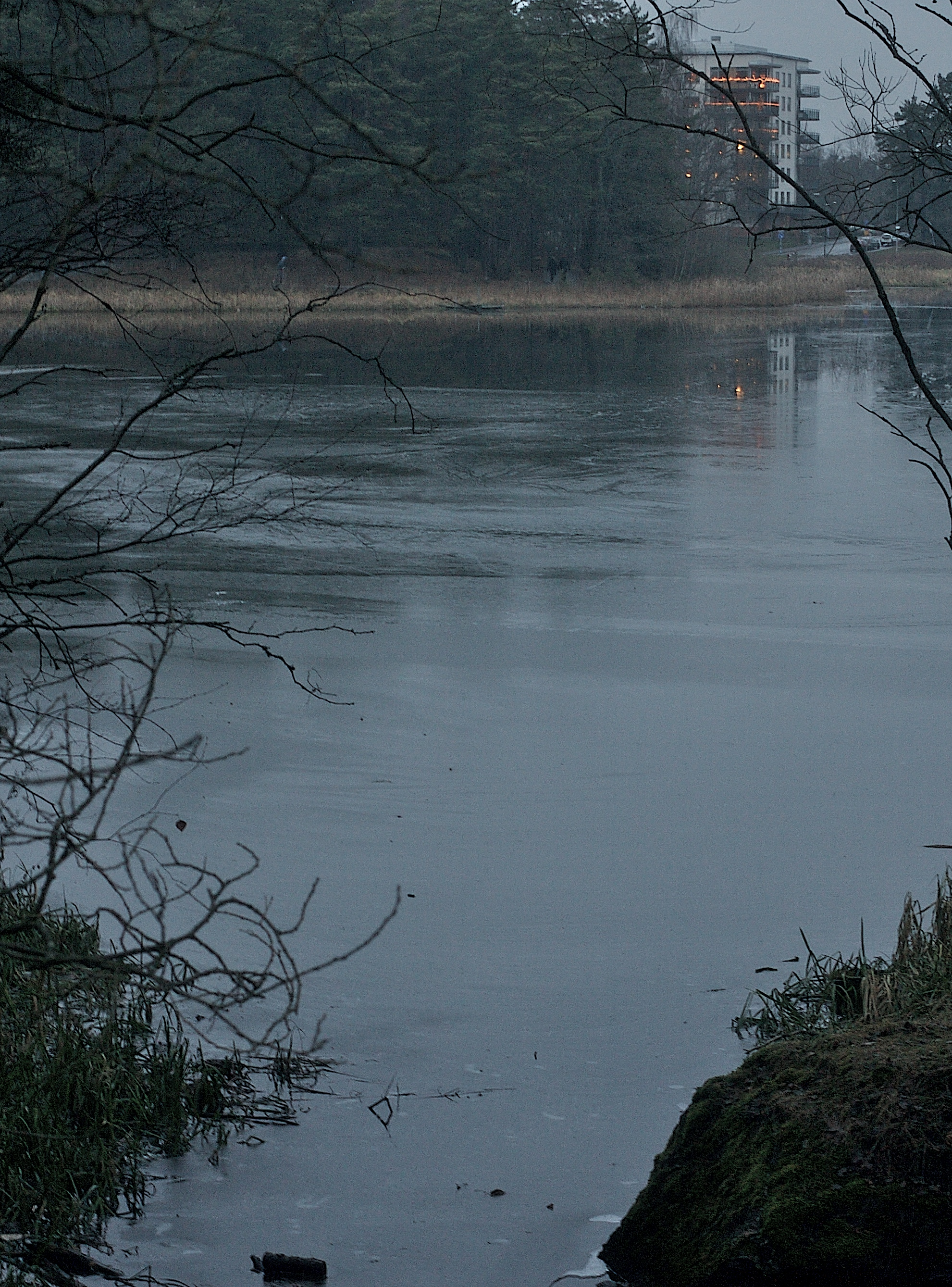

- Location within Stockholm
- Location: Stockholm
- Coordinates: 59°21′8.94″N 17°52′30.17″E
- Primary inflows: Local storm water
- Primary outflows: Lake Mälaren
- Catchment area: 360 ha (890 acres)
- Basin countries: Sweden
- Surface area: 3.6 ha (8.9 acres)
- Average depth: 1.5 m (4 ft 11 in)
- Max. depth: 2.3 m (7 ft 7 in)
- Water volume: 47.1 km^{3} (38,200,000 acre⋅ft)
- Residence time: 2-3 weeks
- Settlements: West Stockholm

Råcksta Träsk (Swedish: "Råcksta Swamp") is a small lake in the western suburbs of Stockholm, Sweden. Notwithstanding its location in the vicinity of the Swedish capital and high levels of lead and copper, the lake is considered as an important breeding ground for frogs, of moderate interest to pleasure fishing, and of minor interest for birds. There are three other small lakes located nearby: Judarn, Kyrksjön, and Lillsjön.

== Catchment area ==
The catchment area is mostly composed of forest and open terrain part of the Grimsta nature reserve, with several minor wetlands. 20 percent of the catchment area is composed of residential buildings and 10 per cent of roads. 300 metres downstream is a historical mill administrated by a society devoted to local culture and history (Vällingby hembygdsförening) with limited means to regulate the water level. West of the lake is a grass-grown peak composed of excavated material from the construction of the suburbs Vällingby and Hässelby. Several heavily trafficked roads and a metro track passes above ground through the catchment area. 7 hectares of the area is occupied by the Råcksta Crematorium and its cemetery. The lake and the surrounding area is regarded as of great recreational value. Pathways were arranged around the lake in the 1970s, angling is popular, and, occasionally, a skating-rink is ploughed on the lake during winters.

=== Environmental influence ===
Local storm water pipes, occasionally fouled with oil of unknown origin, produces most of the affluent, with remaining contributions coming from local roads and run-off from residential areas, the latter bringing mostly nutrients to the lake with minor contributions of zinc and copper (from roofs). High levels of phosphorus have been recorded during late winters and summer. Reports in 1991-1997 of metal content in lake sediments noted moderate levels of copper, the highest levels of lead in any lake in Stockholm, and raised levels of organic compounds such as PAHs and PCB in lower sediments. Levels of copper in the water table were reported as 50 times national median value.

== Flora and fauna ==
Phytoplankton content in August is mostly composed of green algae, with minor populations of diatom and golden algae, and no presence of cyanobacteria. Among Zooplankton the most common is various species of rotifers, with occurrence of copepods, bosminidae, and ciliates.

The number of aquatic plants is relatively small, with the lake floor dominated by rigid hornwort, and free-floating plants including Lemna minor, yellow water-lily, white waterlily, broad-leaved pondweed, and amphibious bistort. Along the shores are Alisma, slender tufted-sedge, cyperus-like sedge, reed sweet-grass, yellow iris, purple loosestrife, Phragmites, Rorippa amphibia, and many others. Common trees found around the lake include black alder and grey sallow.

An examination in 1996 showed the fish stock is dominated by crucian carp accompanied by populations of perch, roach, tench, and common carp. Introduction of trout and rainbow trout was made in 1992. The signal crayfish is known to exist in the lake.

Bird life at the lake was abundant before the lake was dredged in 1973. Since then it has been reduced but has a stable population of mute swan, mallard, reed bunting, and common moorhen.

The area is an important breeding locale for common frog and common toad, both species being protected and classified as of local and regional interest.

== Visiting ==
Guided tours in the area by foot or bike are frequently arranged by the city and the Society for Nature Conservation. Nearest metro station is Råcksta.

== See also ==
- Geography of Stockholm
- List of lakes in Sweden
