= Lambarfjärden =

Fjord in Sweden

Coordinates: 59°22′10″N 17°47′25″E

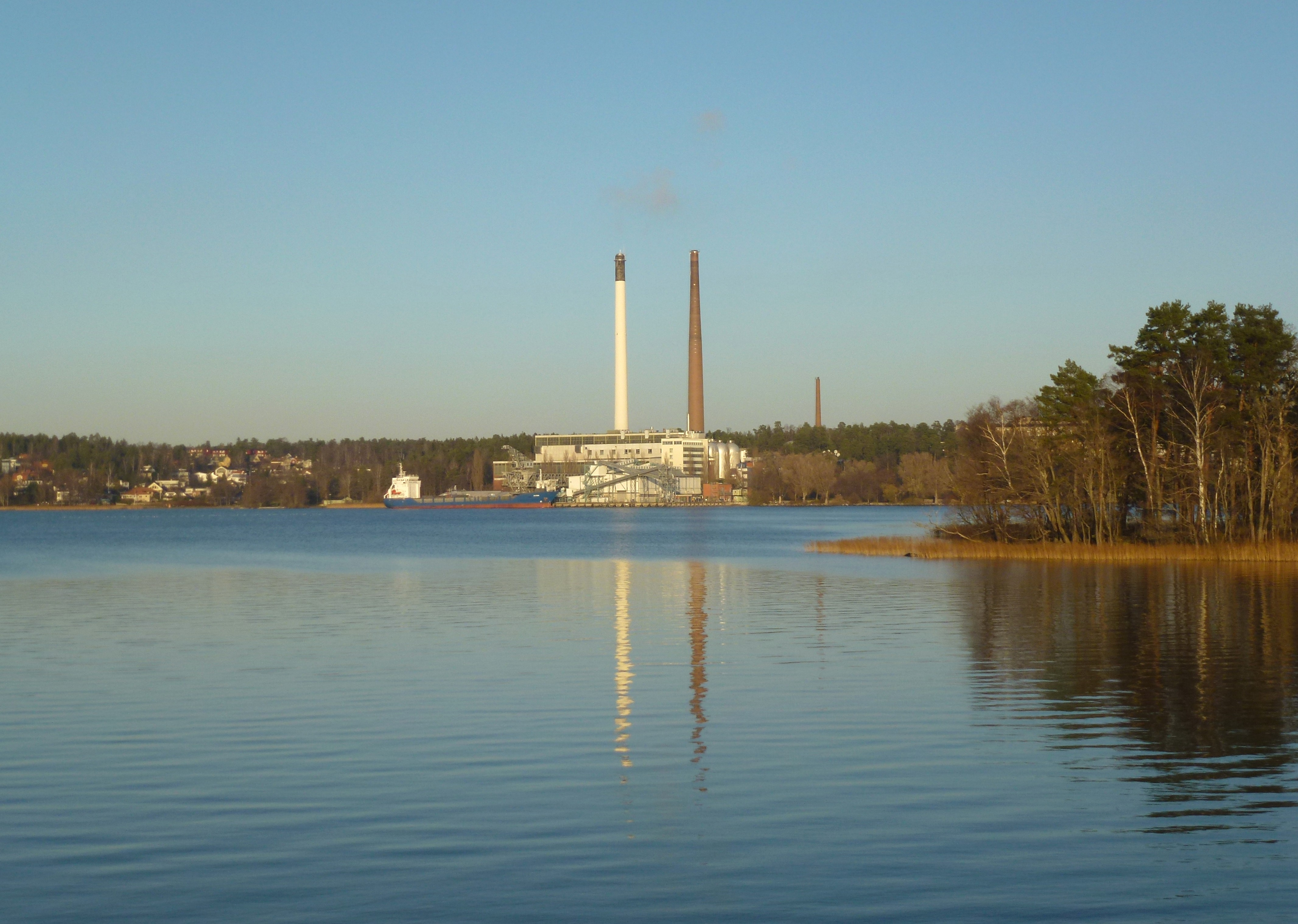
Lambarfjärden in April 2009

Lambarfjärden іs Mälaren's deepest fjord (66 meters). It is located in eastern Mälaren, bounded by Hässelby in the northeast, Lovön in the south, and Färingsö in the west. In Lambarfjärden are Lambarön and Hässelby islets, and on Lovön's northern tip is the community of Lambarudd, named after the bay. Lambarfjärden is also called Lambaren in sailing circles.

== Geography ==
Lambarfjärden's geographic extent is somewhat unclear and no map exists that shows the bay's exact boundaries. On a current map published by the city of Stockholm, however, it appears that Lambarfjärden also runs south of Hässelby islet. To the north, Lambarfjärden merges into Lövstafjärden at about the height of Hässelby villastad, and to the south it merges into Mörbyfjärden, north of Lovö waterworks.

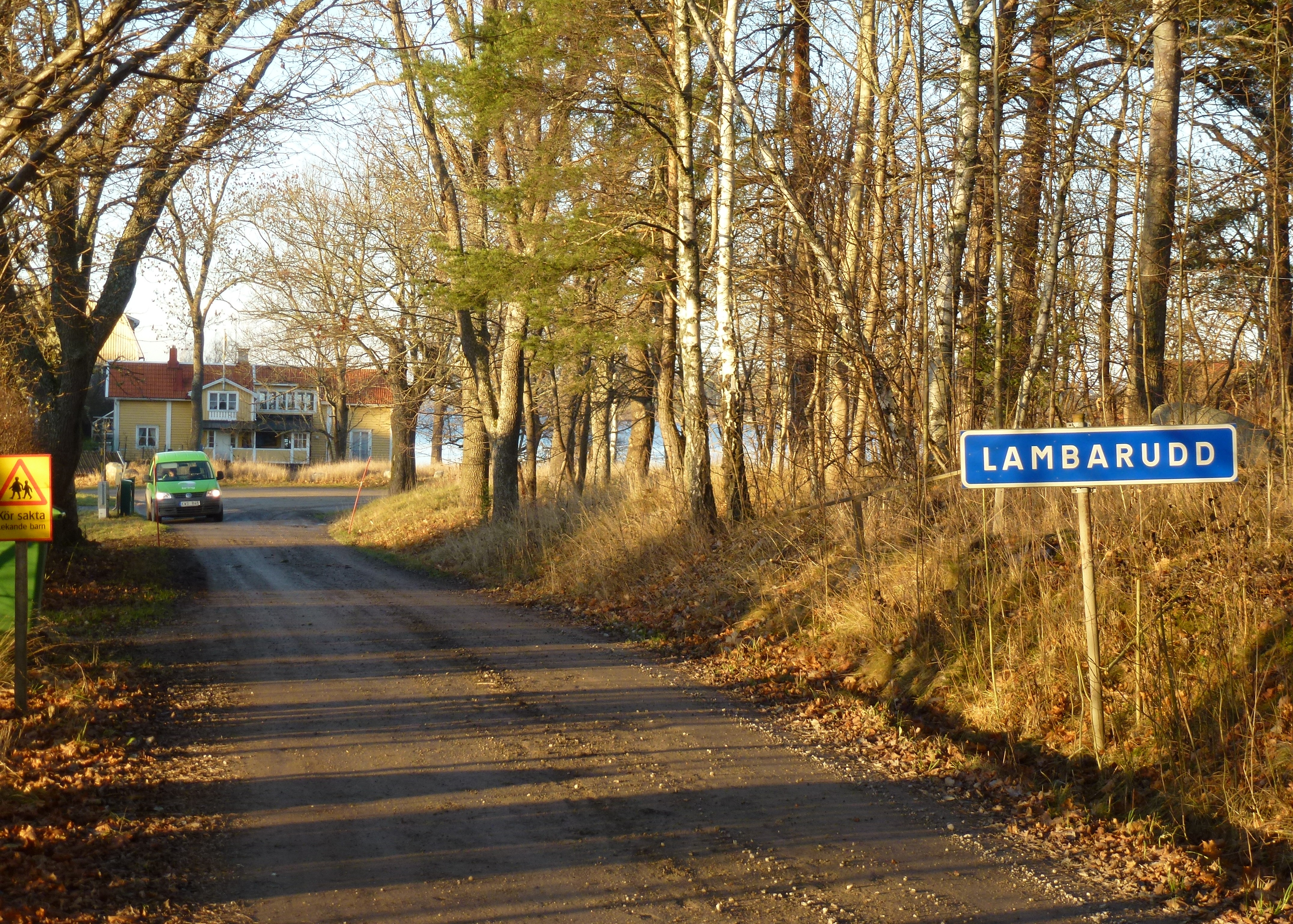
Lambarudd

== Lambarudd ==
The name Lambarudd comes from the fact that it was very appropriate to block off the cape from wild animals in the spring and let the sheep lamb in this place. It became Lambarudden and later Lambarudd. The bay outside became Lambarfjärden, and much later, the island of Fäön also changed its name to Lambarön. The area originally belonged to Hogsta farm. Over time, Lambarudd became a tenant farm with agriculture and one of Lovö's largest commercial gardens with ten greenhouses, outdoor cultivation with bench windows, flower cultivation, many berry bushes and fruit trees, employed staff, and gardening students.

== Bypass Stockholm ==
In connection with the road project Förbifart Stockholm, a bridge was initially planned over Lambarfjärden between Lovön and Grimsta nature reserve, but in 2009 a tunnel under it was proposed instead. The planned tunnel will go approximately 60 meters deep and will be part of the 17-kilometer-long road tunnel between Kungens Kurva in the south and Häggvik in the north.
