= Judarn =

Lake in Bromma, Stockholm, Sweden

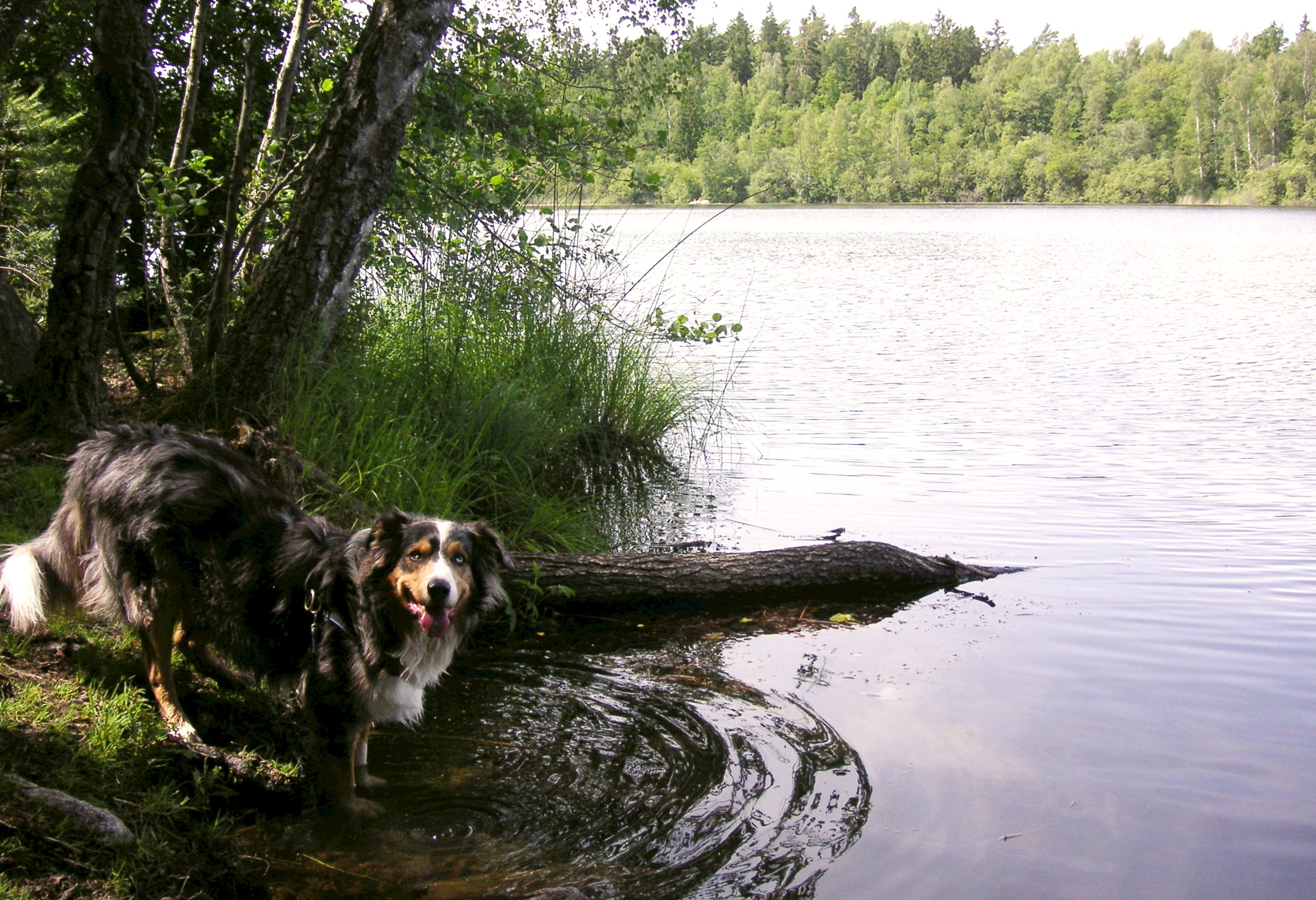
- Lake Judarn in the nature reserve Judarskogen, in summer 2008

- Location within Stockholm
- Location: Bromma, Stockholm
- Coordinates: 59°20′13.96″N 17°54′51.14″E
- Primary inflows: Local stormwater
- Primary outflows: Mälaren
- Catchment area: 0.8 km^{2} (0.31 sq mi)
- Basin countries: Sweden
- Surface area: 74,000 m^{2} (800,000 sq ft)
- Average depth: 2.7 m (8 ft 10 in)
- Max. depth: 3.7 m (12 ft)
- Water volume: 179,000 m^{3} (145 acre⋅ft)
- Residence time: 11 months
- Settlements: West Stockholm

Judarn is a small lake in Bromma, a western suburb of Stockholm, Sweden. Surrounded by forest and the Judarskogen nature reserve, it stretches between Åkeshov and Södra Ängby. Three other lakes are found nearby: Kyrksjön, Lillsjön, and Råcksta Träsk. The name is etymologically associated to ljuda, the verb "to sound".

== Characteristics ==
With an area of 74,000 square metres and an average depth of 2.7 metres (maximum 3.7 m), the lake contains 180,000 cubic metres of water and is supplied by a drainage area of 0.8 km². Originally supplying lake Lillsjön, Judarn today discharges into lake Mälaren. Regarded as one of the least contaminated lakes in Stockholm, Judarn receives storm water from a nearby traffic route which gives it considerable levels of lead resulting in a bathing ban, metal content otherwise being low and phosphorus levels moderate. The lake, considered as being of great recreational and natural value, is part of the nature reserve Judarskogen and has a rich flora and fauna with many aquatic plants, birds, and frogs. Its isolated location combined with low levels of chlorophyll makes Judarn one of the clearest lakes in Stockholm, and notwithstanding low levels of oxygen nutrient content is low even during winters, with raised levels of PAH and PCB in deep sediments.

== Geology ==
Geological traces of the inland ice which withdrew from the area some 11,000 years ago are found in the moraines around the lake. The huge square blocks of stone scattered in the area are the result of the earthquakes produced by the tension caused by the retiring ice. The geologist Gerhard de Geer studied the surrounding moraine ridges, which were eventually given his name, and geological excursions are still common in the area.

== Flora ==
The flora in the lake itself is reduced to a few species, including White Waterlily, Common Bladderwort, and Whorled Water-Milfoil; while others plants are found along the beaches, including Narrow Leaf Cattail, Slender Tufted-sedge, Greater Pond-sedge, Marsh Cinquefoil, Gypsywort, Yellow loosestrife, Purple Loosestrife, and Corn Mint. An isolated biotope of Greater Spearwort is found on the southern end of the lake. Among surrounding trees and bushes can be found Black Alder, Buckthorn, Grey Willow, and Bay Willow.

== Fauna ==
The fauna is dominated by Gastropods, Caddisflies and dragonflies. Fishes present in the lake include Perch, Roach, and Crucian carp. Mirror Carp and Signal crayfish have been introduced in the lake, the crayfish forming a population allowing fishing. A population of Great Crested Newt has now vanished, but the City of Stockholm is planning to reintroduce them by constructing dams and ponds to recreate their natural habitat.

== Visiting ==
Walks around the lake are organized regularly by Bromma borough and the Society for Nature Conservation (Svenska Naturskyddsföreningen). Nearest metro station is Åkeshov.

== See also ==
- Geography of Stockholm
- Lakes in Sweden
