= Lillsjön =

Lillsjön means "small lake" in Swedish and may refer to:

1. Lillsjön (Ulvsunda) - a lake in western Stockholm.
2. Lillsjön - a former lake in Norra Djurgården, north-eastern Stockholm.
3. Lillsjön, Norrköping - a lake in Norrköping.
