= Kyrksjön =

Lake in Stockholm, Sweden

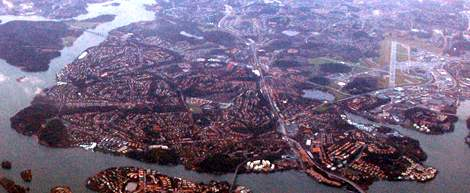
- Aerial view of the surrounding area. Kyrksjön is located in the centre-right background.

- Location within Stockholm
- Coordinates: 59°20′57.66″N 17°54′58.20″E
- Primary inflows: Local stormwater
- Primary outflows: Mälaren
- Catchment area: 48 ha (120 acres)
- Basin countries: Sweden
- Surface area: 6.7 ha (17 acres)
- Average depth: 1.5 m (4 ft 11 in)
- Max. depth: 2.5 m (8 ft 2 in)
- Water volume: 76,500 m^{3} (62.0 acre⋅ft)
- Residence time: 7 months
- Settlements: West Stockholm

Kyrksjön (Swedish: Church Lake) is a small lake in Bromma, a western suburb in Stockholm, Sweden. Named after its vicinity to the old Bromma Church, the lake was made part of the nature reserve Kyrksjölöten in 1997. Three other lakes are located near Kyrksjön: Judarn, Lillsjön, and Råcksta Träsk.

== Characteristics ==
With an area of 6,7 hectares and average depth of 1,5 metres (maximum 2,5 metres), Kyrkosjön contains 80,000 cubic metres of water and is supplied by a drainage area of 48 hectares. The lake is thus small and shallow, with no feeder or storm water conduit connected to it. The lake is surrounded by one of the biggest broadleaf forest in Stockholm rich in various species of birds, batrachians, and bats. Levels of phosphorus and nitrogen have decreased since the 1980s. Metal levels are low and the waters are moderately clear. Two bathe are located at Kyrkosjön, which is considered to be of significant recreational and natural value. Sewers from a nearby allotment-garden and a traffic route produces some input flow, but normally not enough to even produce an outflow. Historically considerably larger, Kyrksjön used to extend well into the Spånga parish and its outflow used to discharge through a nine metres tall white water. The lake was lowered to the present level in 1863 which resulted in today's stagnant lake, notwithstanding later attempts to reopen the outflow.

== Flora and fauna ==
Moderate levels of algae are commons in late summer, principally golden algae and carapace algae (Ceratium hirudinella), while zooplankton (such as Rotifer and Copepod) are relatively rare). Aquatic plants are relatively few, the lake floor is mostly covered by Charales such as Chara tomentosa (present since the mid 19th century), accompanied by bladderwort, milfoils, and others. Along the shores are found Carex pseudocyperus, purple loosestrife, milk parsley, and lesser bulrush. Trees around the lake include black alder and grey willow. Bottom specimens taken in July 1996 mostly unveiled larvae of chironomids, Oligochaeta, and empty shells - typical for lakes rich in nutrients but poor in oxygen. Specimens taken along the shores the same year resulted in reports of mayflies, caddisflies, and dragonflies. Fish population has been decimated by low levels of oxygen and is now reduced to Crucian carp.

Birds reported include Eurasian coot, great crested grebe, tufted duck, common moorhen, pochard, and Slavonian grebe. The dense vegetation surrounding the lake contains nightingales, blackcaps and marsh warblers hiding from sparrowhawks, goshawks, and tawny owls. The lake is also an important breeding ground for frogs, including common frog, moor frog, and common toad. The presence of great crested newt is threatened and all frog species are protected by law. Grass snake was observed in 1996. Surrounding buildings and deciduous forest forms a great habitat for bats such as northern bat, soprano pipistrelle, Daubenton's bat, and Nyctalus.

== See also ==
- Geography of Stockholm
- Lakes in Sweden
