= Grimsta Nature Reserve =

Nature reserve in Stockholm, Sweden

Coordinates: 59°21′06″N 17°51′50″E

- Grimsta naturreservat
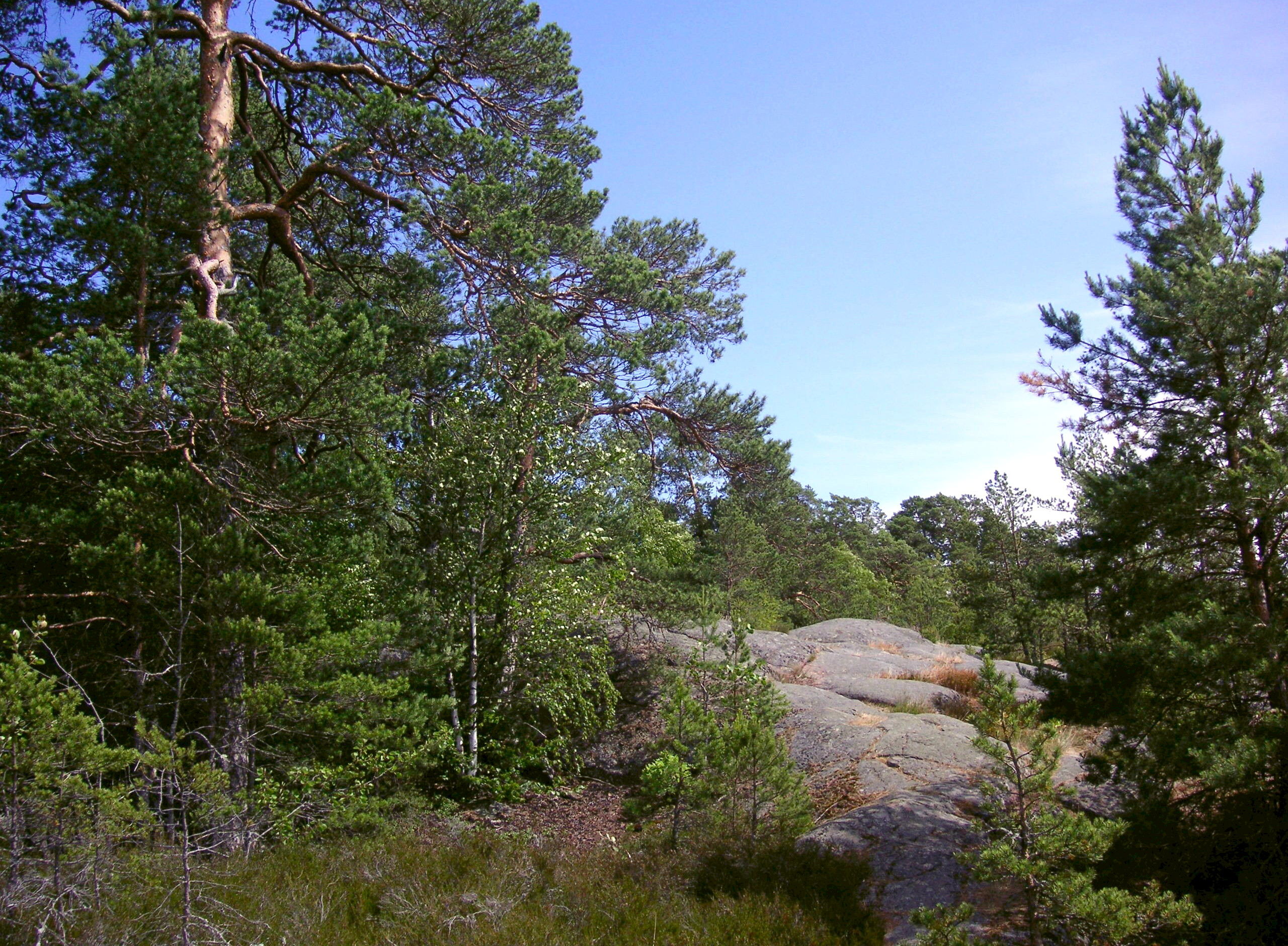
- Type: Nature Reserve
- Location: Stockholm municipality, Sweden
- Area: 320.13 hectares
- Established: November 16, 2004

Grimsta Nature Reserve (or Grimstaskogen), is a nature reserve in Västerort, in the municipality of Stockholm, Sweden. Grimsta Nature Reserve is surrounded by Södra Ängby, Blackeberg, Grimsta, Hässelby and Lake Mälaren. It is located in the parish of Spånga in Uppland (Stockholm County).

== Description ==
The reserve was established in 2004 and covers approximately 320 hectares. Grimsta Nature Reserve extends along Lake Mälaren from Tyska botten in the south to the Hässelby strand in the north. Råckstaträsk lake and the Mälaren island Hässelby holme are included in the reserve. The reserve includes several boating and canoeing clubs, Kanaanbadet, Kvarnviken's mill, and the shoreline areas of Blackebergsbacken and Blackeberg Hospital. Along Lake Mälaren, there is a footpath with extensive views of the water. There are wide rocky areas with pine forests, hilly coniferous forests, and biologically interesting noble and moist deciduous forests. Within the reserve, there are electric light trails and bridle paths.

== Purpose ==
The purpose of Grimsta Nature Reserve is to preserve and develop the area's natural, cultural and recreational qualities for the future and to contribute to safeguarding Stockholm's biodiversity.

== Stockholm Bypass ==
The Stockholm Bypass is planned to go under Grimstaskogen forest near Kanaanbadet, and a non-profit organisation called Arbetsgruppen Rädda Grimstaskogen is working to stop this or reduce environmental degradation. As the plans for the Stockholm Bypass originally stood, a 6-lane motorway bridge over Lambarfjärden was supposed to dive into a tunnel just above the beach between Kanaanbadet and Maltesholmsbadet, but this has been stopped. In 2010, the Stockholm Bypass was planned to go in a tunnel under Lambarfjärden as well, and therefore there will be no motorway bridge and no bridge abutment in the nature reserve.

== Gallery ==
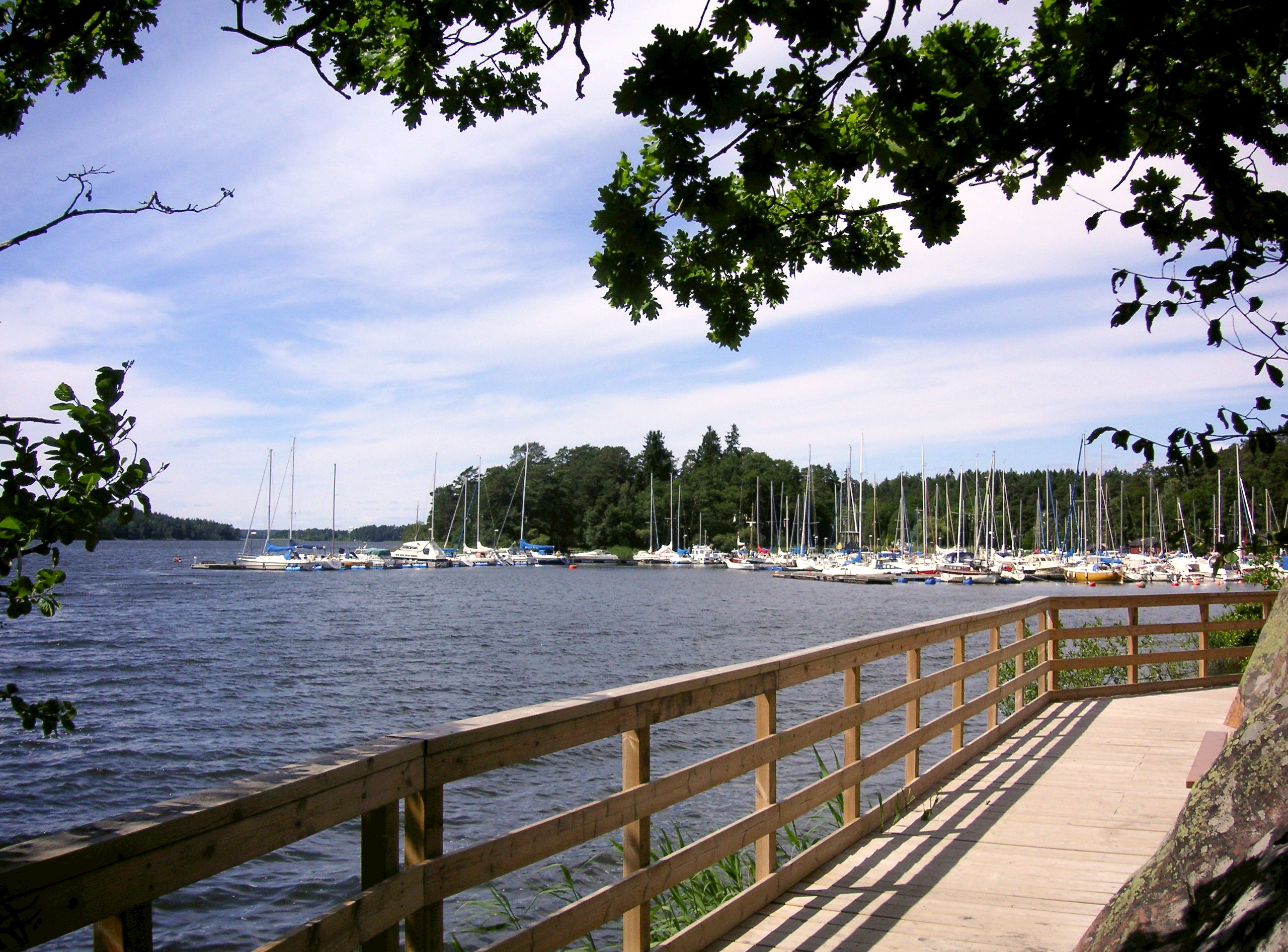
The walking path by Lake Mälaren.

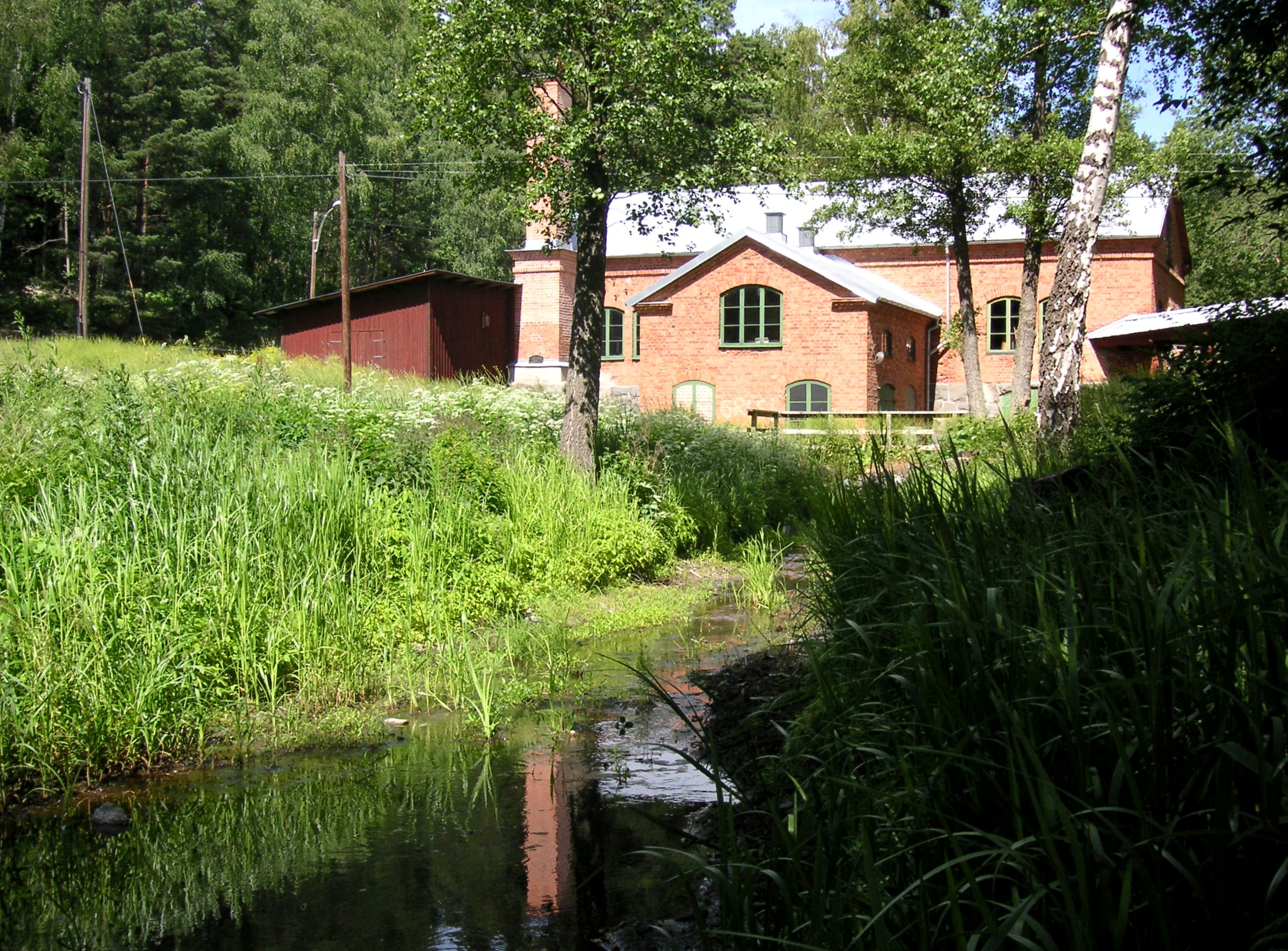
Kvarnviken mill.

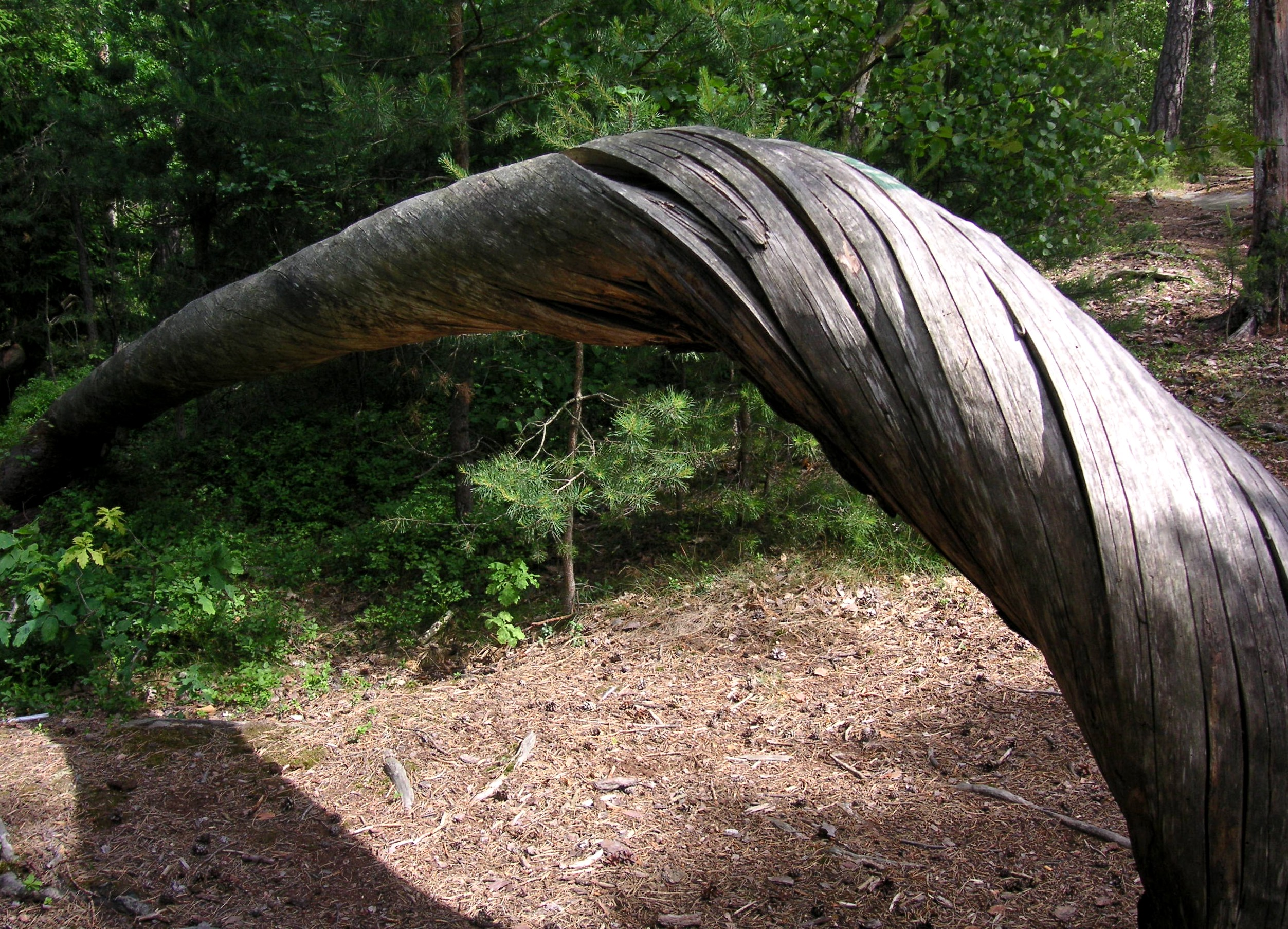
The pine forest.

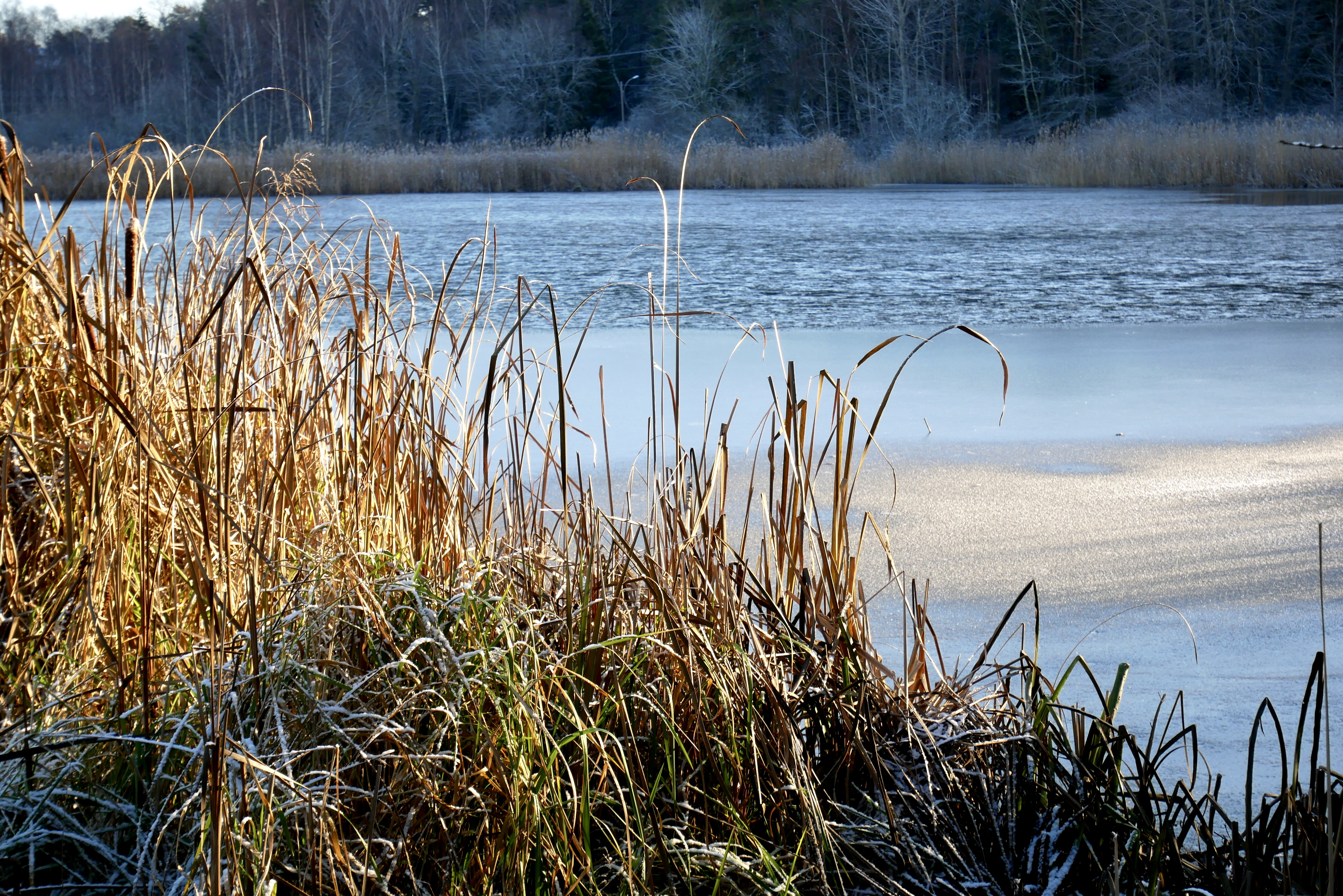
Marsh.

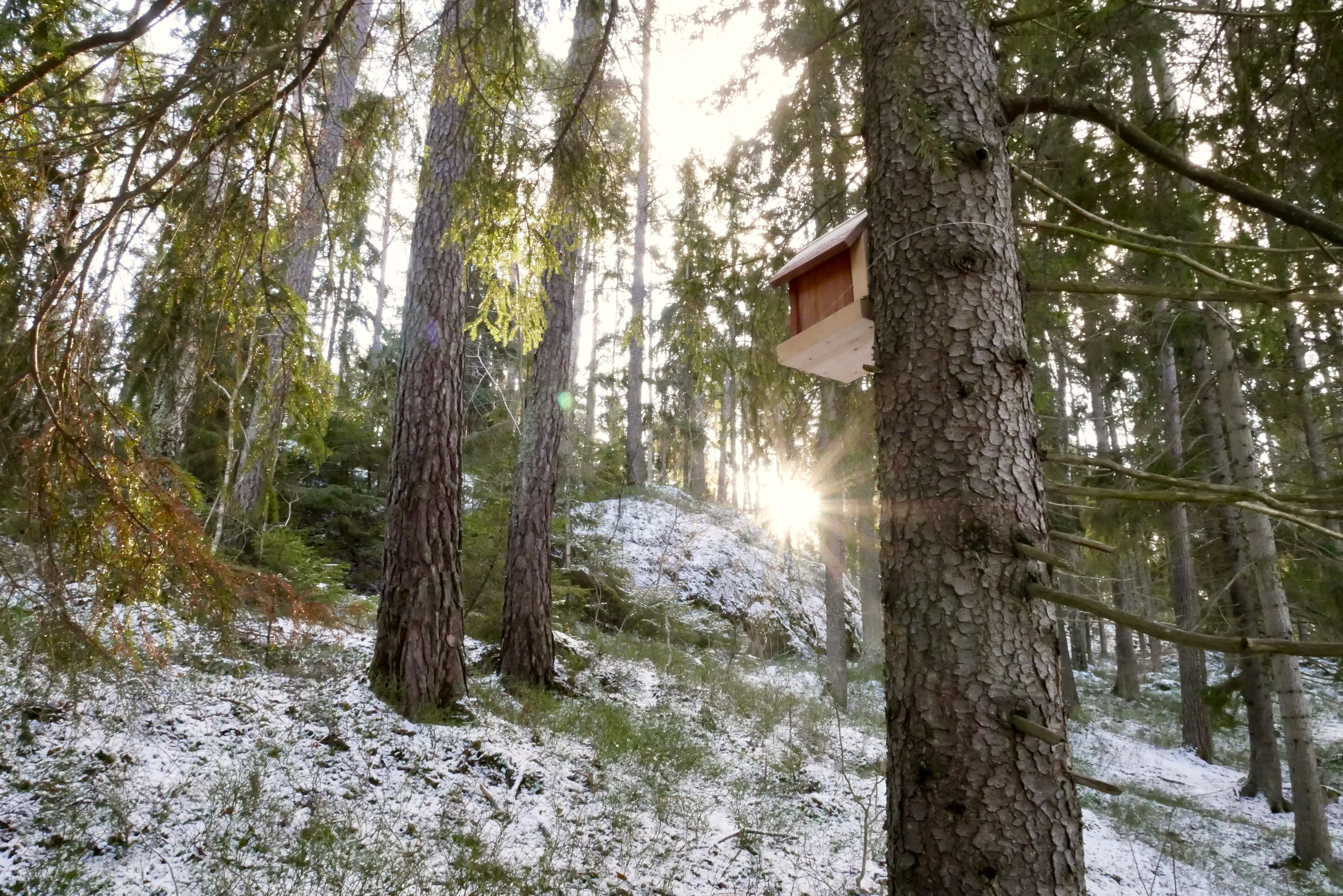
Winter time.

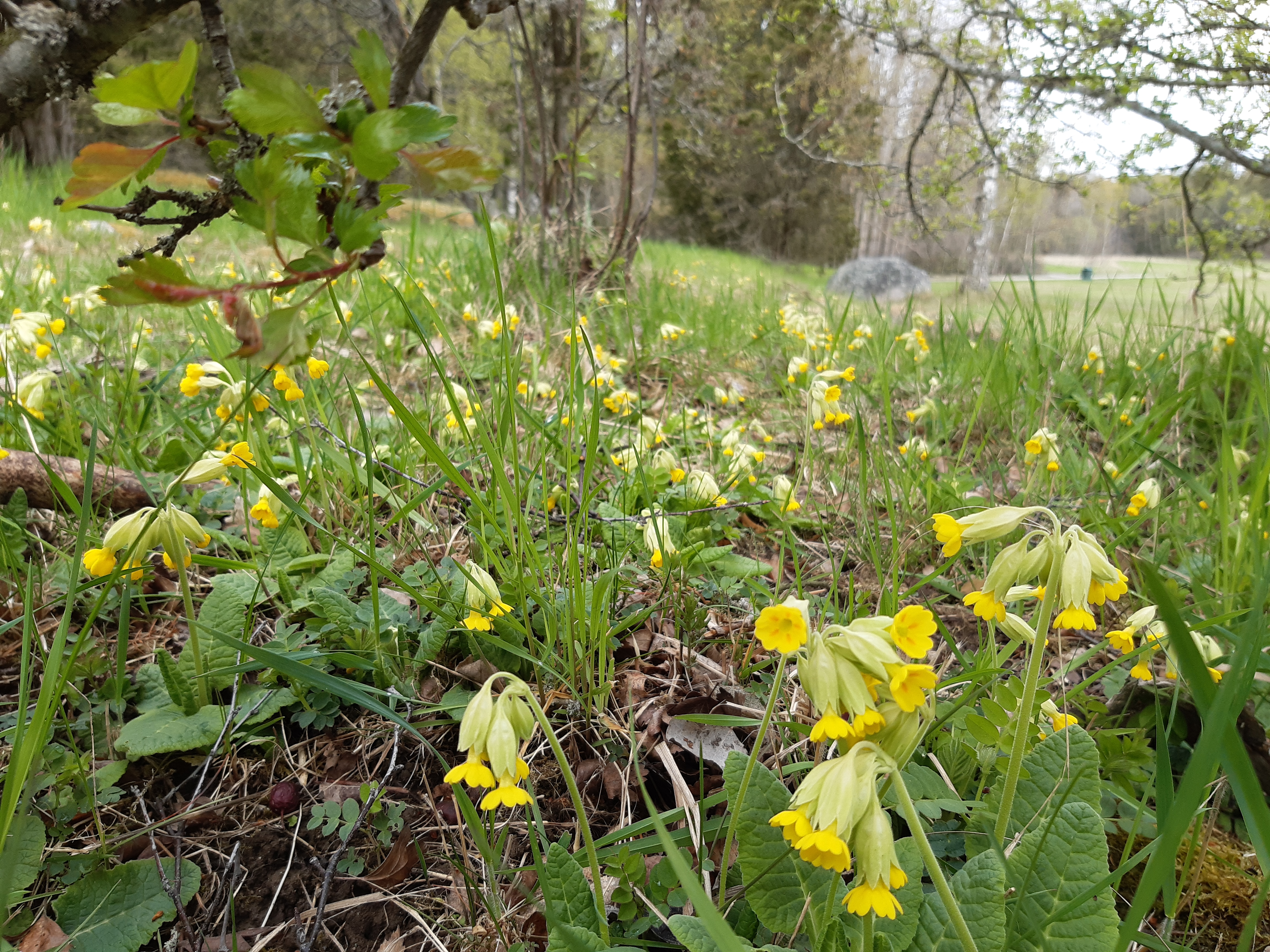
The cowslips bloom in Grimsta juniper hill, in the northern part of the reserve.
