= Hässelbyholm =

Manor house in Strängnäs Municipality, Sweden

- Södermanland County, Sweden.
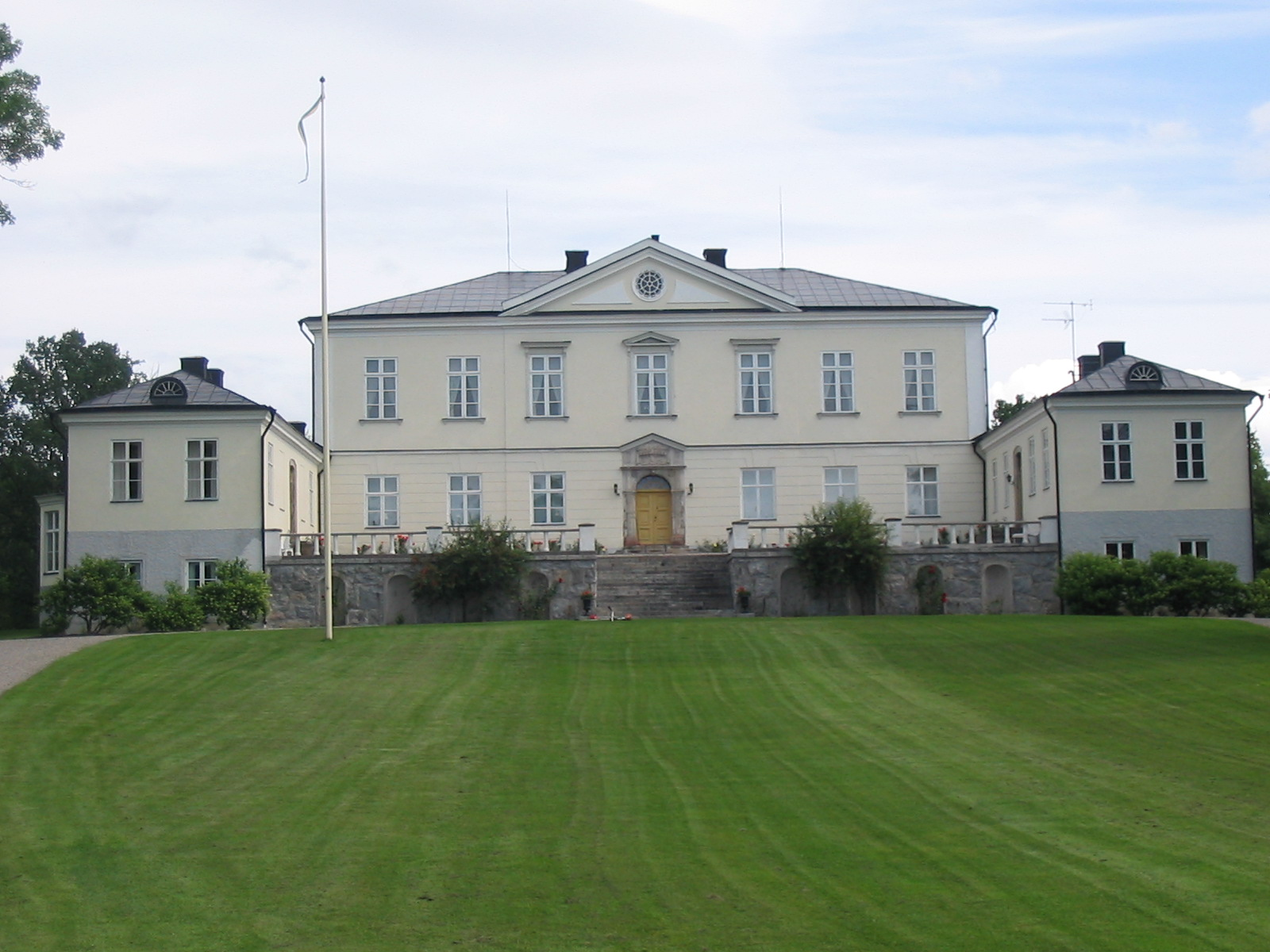

Hässelbyholm is a Renaissance style manor house in Strängnäs Municipality, Södermanland County, Sweden.

== History ==
Hässelbyholm is located on a peninsula in Lake Mälaren. Hässelbyholm was the result of the merger of the two estates Hässelby and Ekeby in Södermanland. Werner Brunkow Ekeby sold the property in 1279 to the Bishop of Strängnäs. Into the mid-14th century, Hässelbyholm belonged to Vårfruberga Abbey. With the Protestant Reformation, the property became crown property. In 1738, Hässelbyholm sold to Christina Piper, (1673–1752) widow of Count Carl Piper (1647–1716). In 1747, she made Hässelbyholm a Fideicommissum for his granddaughter Countess Eva Charlotta Bielke and her heirs.

== See also ==
- Hässelby
- List of castles in Sweden

== Other Sources ==
This article is fully or partially based on material from Nordisk familjebok, Hässelbyholm, 1904–1926.
