= Hässelby (novel) =

2007 novel by Johan Harstad

- 2009 paperback edition
- Author: Johan Harstad
- Language: Norwegian
- Publisher: 12 October 2007
- Publication place: Norway

Hässelby is a novel by the Norwegian author Johan Harstad, published in 2007. The title refers to Hässelby, a suburb of Stockholm, Sweden.

== Character source ==
Albert Åberg (Alfie Atkins in English, Alfons Åberg in Swedish), the main character of the novel, is also the name of a well-known Swedish children's book's character, famous from the books by Gunilla Bergström. In these children's books, Albert is a boy between the age of four and six, living in an apartment together with his father.

== Plot ==
In Harstad's novel, Albert is 42 years old and still lives with his father in the same apartment. When his father suddenly dies, Albert sees it as an opportunity to finally create the life for himself that he longed for all these years he was taking care of his father. A large part of the novel is made up of a flashback to 1985-86 when Albert traveled around Europe with his friend Viktor, and by coincidence ends up in Hong Kong and later Paris, where he meets a girl and almost decides to stay for good, before ending up returning to his father in Hässelby. The novel starts as a traditional novel exploring themes such as the relationship between father and son, growing up in suburbia, friendship and politics, but throughout the novel the tone gradually gets darker and darker as more surreal elements are introduced. The novel ends as a nightmarish tale where Albert discovers that someone have been following him for over twenty years, all over the world, and that the world is coming to an end.

== Influences ==
Hässelby is strongly influenced by David Lynch's TV series Twin Peaks, the theory of Synchronicity and Arthur Koestler's book The Roots of Coincidence as well as the music of The Police.
