= Förbifart Stockholm =

Road in Sweden

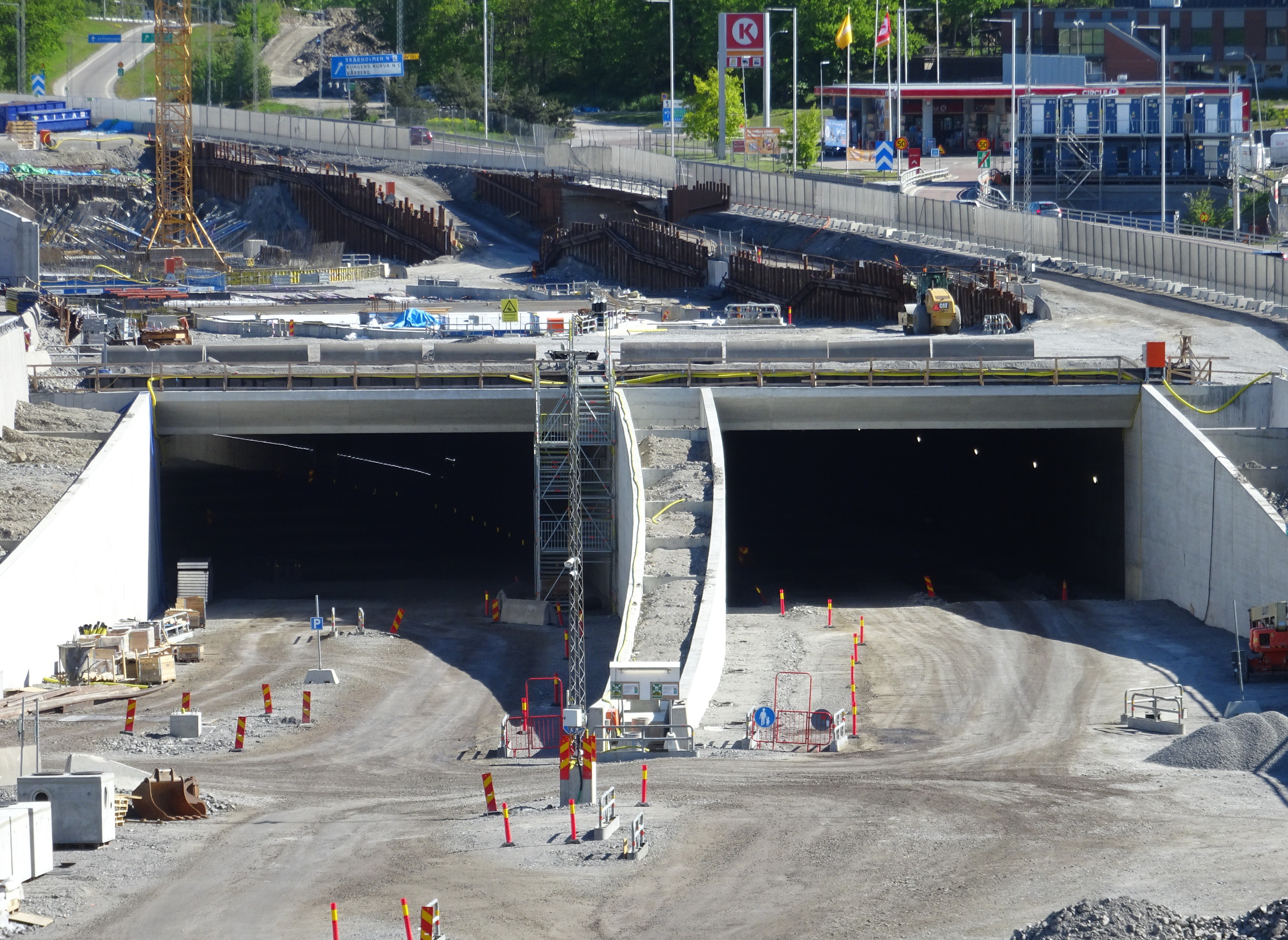
Construction site at Kungens Kurva, May 2020.

Förbifart Stockholm (Stockholm Bypass) is a series of underground motorway tunnels currently under construction between the Kungens Kurva interchange in the south of Stockholm and the Häggvik interchange north of Stockholm. Most of this bypass, more than 17 out of 21 kilometres, is being built underground. The Swedish government decided to permit the construction of the bypass on 3 September 2009, according to a proposal by the Swedish Road Administration.

The bypass will become the world's third longest road tunnel in the proximity of a city, after the Westconnex Tunnel in Sydney and the Yamate Tunnel in Tokyo. 140,000 vehicles per day are expected to use the bypass. The tunnel reaches at its deepest point 65 metres below sea level and Lake Mälaren. The projected cost for the project is estimated at 27.6 billion (short scale) SEK (2009 value, around 3.5 billion US dollars or 2.7 billion euros). Construction began in August 2014, but was stopped for political reasons soon after. It was restarted in early 2015 and was then expected to take ten years to complete.

== History ==
The highway has been in the planning stage since 1966, when a regional planning sketch titled Greater Stockholm Physical Structure 2000 (Swedish: Storstockholm fysisk struktur år 2000) proposed three concentric circular arcs surround Stockholm to the west. The innermost arc was Brommagrenen, whose on-ramps were put in place already when Essingeleden was under construction. The next bypass to the west was a connection between Essingeleden at Brännkyrka over Ålsten past Bromma airport and northwards, an extent that is reminiscent of Diagonal Ulvsunda. The third, outermost bypass had an extent mostly coinciding with the currently planned Förbifart Stockholm and was called Kungshattsleden. In the 1992 Dennis Package,^{(sv)} it had the name Västerleden (Western Route). In 2001, an alternative consisting of a tunnel under Ekerö was included in the plans.

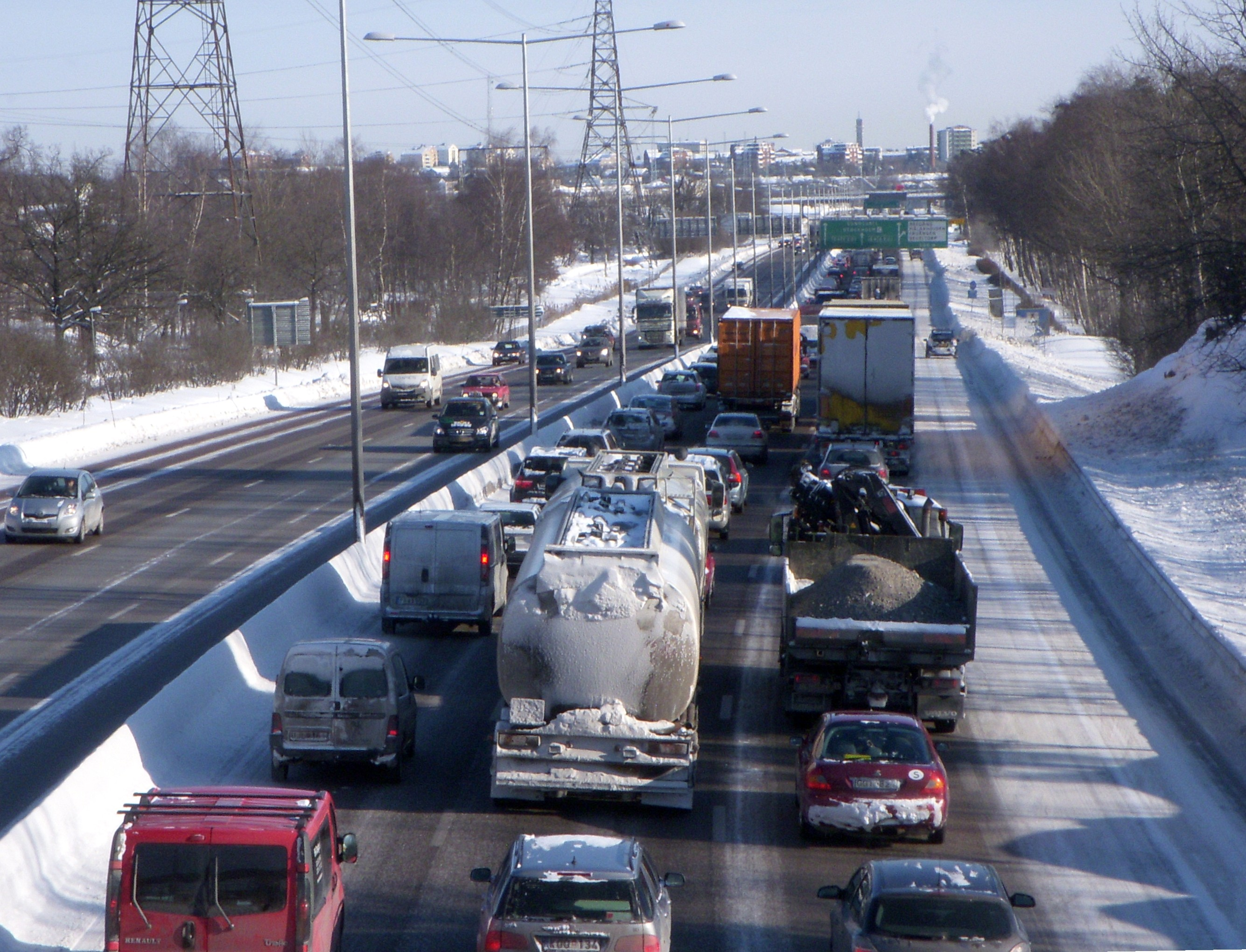
Northbound traffic towards Stockholm on E4/E20 during rush hour, between the Kungens Kurva and Bredäng traffic interchanges on 22 February 2010.

The road capacity over the relatively narrow passage between Saltsjön in the east and lake Mälaren in the west (where Stockholm is located) has not been expanded since Essingeleden opened in 1967. Essingeleden was designed with a capacity of 80,000 vehicles per day; today, the load is twice that on a normal weekday. This makes Essingeleden sensitive to traffic disturbances, with consequent road congestion. The heavy vehicular load also causes severe wear and tear on the road surface, with large needs for repairs as a result.

To solve the problem the Road Authority presented in its investigation North-South connections in the Stockholm area 2005 (Nord-sydliga förbindelser i Stockholmsområdet år 2005) three alternatives: Förbifart Stockholm, Diagonal Ulvsunda, and a combined alternative; the Road Authority recommended the first alternative.

The Centre Party, Liberal People's Party, Christian Democrats, Moderate Party, and Social Democratic Party were in 2010 supportive of the road project, while the Green Party and Left Party were opposed to it.

Arguments supporting the construction of the bypass are the creation of improved road access, reduction of inefficient travelling time, and reduction the load on central parts of Stockholm due to transit traffic. Arguments against construction cite increased carbon dioxide emissions, the high cost, environmental impact along the construction route, and that traffic problems are not being addressed in a long-term perspective because travellers in the Stockholm region are enticed to continue using private transportation rather than public transportation, and because a high percentage of the present-day traffic on the frequently congested Essingeleden is local traffic to or from central Stockholm, rather than transit traffic.

On 19 August 2014, there was a groundbreaking ceremony, led by the minister for infrastructure. However, after the election of September 2014, a new government was elected and they decided on 23 October 2014 to halt the construction (even if contracts with construction companies were signed) for a half-year period to debate the project. Soon, a decision was made to restart the project, but this political manoeuver delayed the project for half a year.

== The extension ==
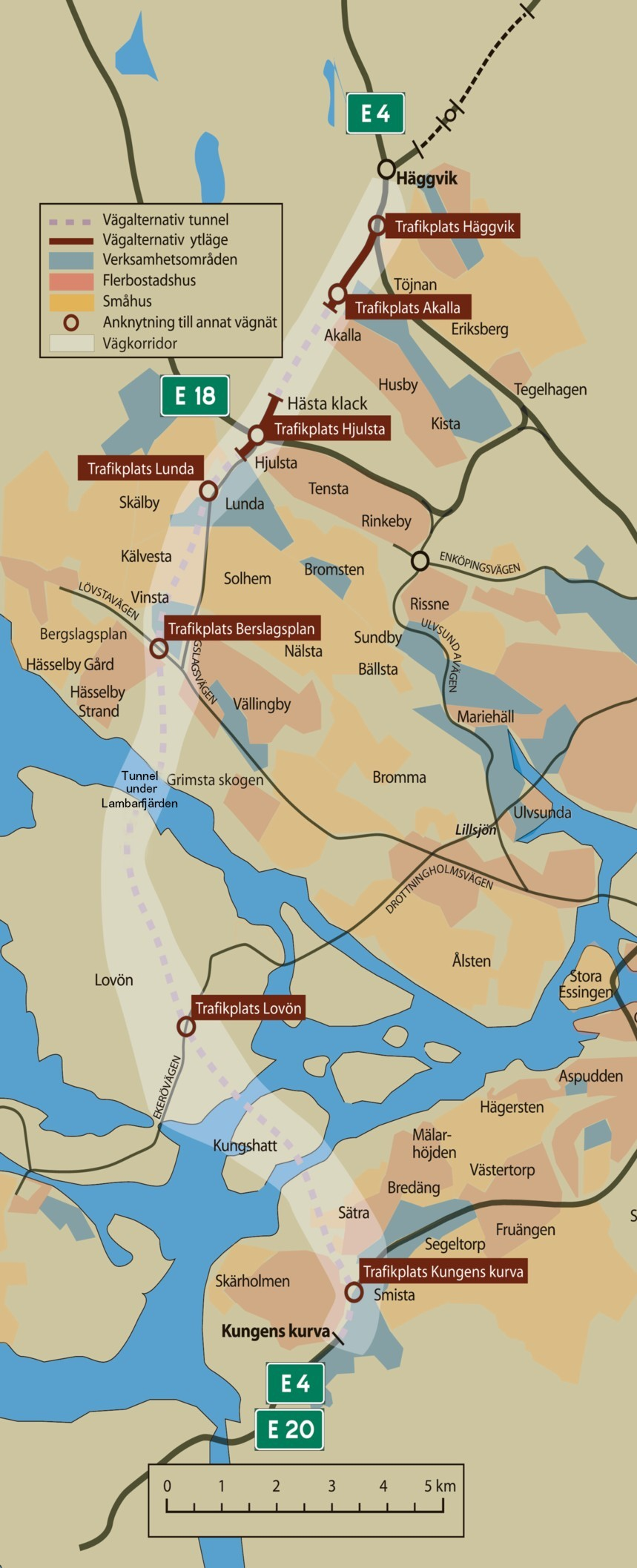
Förbifart Stockholm (white area) according to a brochure from the Swedish Road Administration 2008.

The current plan is presented on the website of the Swedish Transport Administration in section Railway and Road → Road Construction Projects → E4 The Stockholm bypass. The highway extension will consist of the following sections:

=== The South Part ===
The south part would start from the E4 highway at Kungens Kurva and go underground until the island of Lovön.

=== Lovön ===
The highway continues underground to the mainland east of Hässelby Strand. Initially there were plans to let the highway to go above ground on the north part of Lovön and pass over a bridge to the mainland, but this was changed.

=== Grimsta Nature Reserve ===
The tunnel proceeds under the Grimsta Nature Reserve.

=== Regional Road 275 ===
The highway would continue underground directly west of Regional Road 275, ending at Akalla.

=== The North Part ===
The last part of the highway from Akalla to the E4 south of Häggvik would be above ground.

== Completion ==
In 2009, the project was approved by the Swedish government in September 2009 and construction was expected to start in 2010 and take 8 years to complete. The cost was estimated at 27 billion Swedish kronor. However, the construction start was in 2014 with real tunnel excavation starting 2016 with 10 years expected completion time and 34 billion kronor cost. In 2019, delays in tunnel construction and legal violations on work safety caused cancellation of a contract for one part of the tunnel. As of the end of 2019, the expected completion time is 14 years, year 2030 and the cost 37 billion kronor.

== Criticism ==
=== Uppdrag Granskning (Swedish Television) ===
According to an episode of the documentary program series Uppdrag granskning, titled Sweden's Most Expensive Motorway ("Sveriges dyraste motorväg"), the project will not solve the congestion problem, but instead result in a substantial increase in the use of cars and trucks as means of transportation.

== See also ==
- Maryland Route 200, the InterCounty Connector, a tolled motorway bypass through the northern suburbs of Washington, D.C., USA with some similarities to Förbifart Stockholm, but with no tunnels, which was completed in November 2014.
