= Hässelby Villastad =

Coordinates: 59°22′14″N 17°49′14″E

- Country: Sweden
- County: Stockholm County

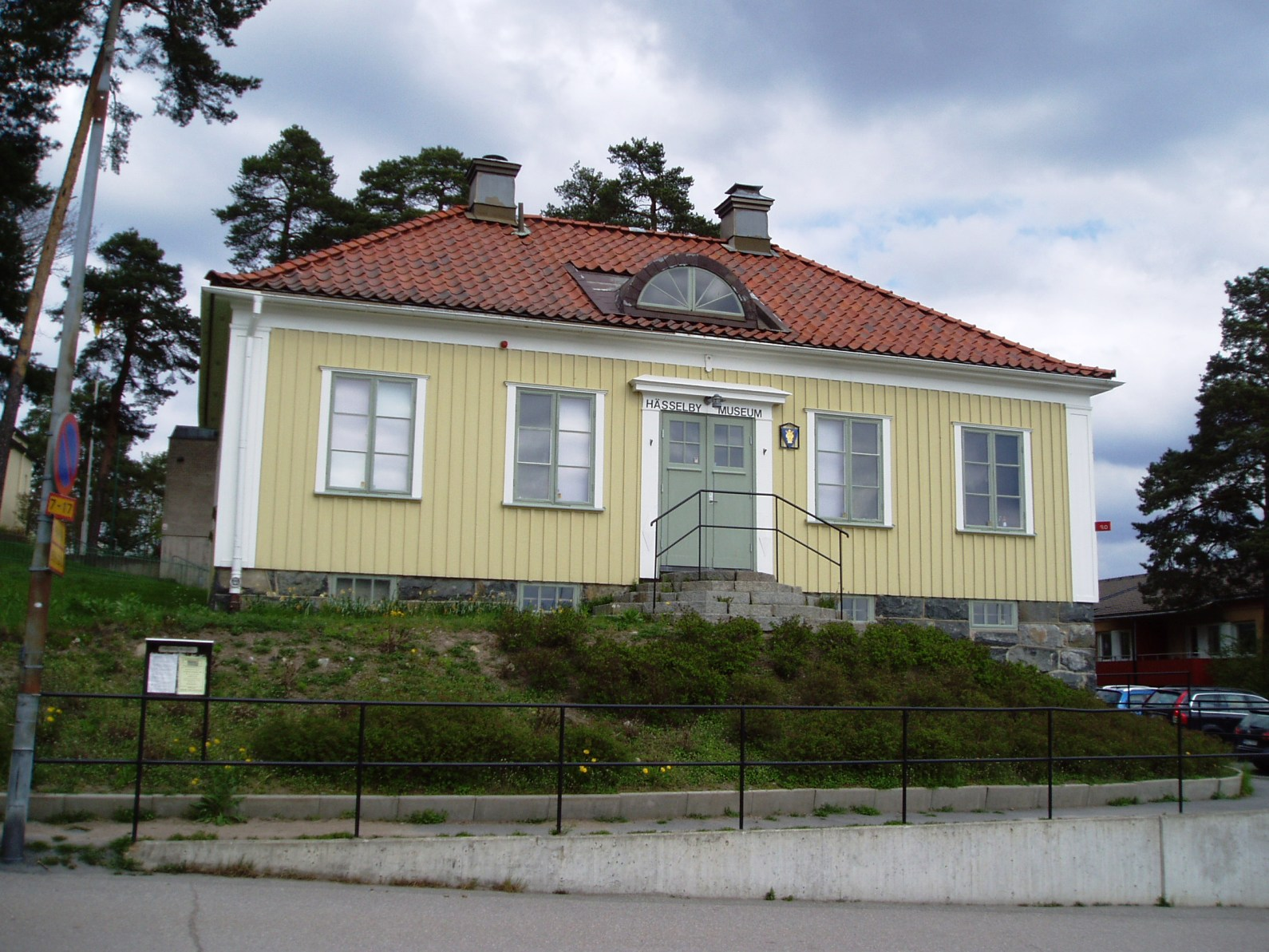
Hässelby Villastad was a separate municipality 1926–1948, but was incorporated in the City of Stockholm from 1 January 1949. The town hall of the former municipality is now a museum.

Hässelby Villastad is a city district of Stockholm, in the north-western part of the Swedish capital Stockholm. It forms part of Västerort, Stockholm Municipality. Stretching west to Lake Mälaren, it is largely a high-class area with notable landmarks being the central commercial area Åkermyntan, and the big landfill Lövsta, which was used for all of Stockholm's refuse from the late 19th century to about 1950.

== Schools ==
The city district has several schools, the biggest are Hässelby Villastadsskolan, Trollbodaskolan, and Smedshagsskolan, with all having approximately 1,000 students each.

== Attractions ==
Riddersvik is a park and a mansion with two wings. Today used for conferences and a restaurant, it was originally built for a businessman in the 18th century, who used it as a leisure park. Beside the mansion is a wooden jetty attached to the rock stretching along the water from Riddersvik to Fargersstrand. Allmäna badet is the main beach in the municipality, with a newly built wooden deck. There are two piers from which one can jump into the water, and on the other side of the beach there is the children's beach. In Hässelby there is a nature resort called "Lövstaskogen" which is a popular destination for promenades.

== See also ==
- Hässelby
