= Lillsjön (Ulvsunda) =

Lake in Stockholm, Sweden

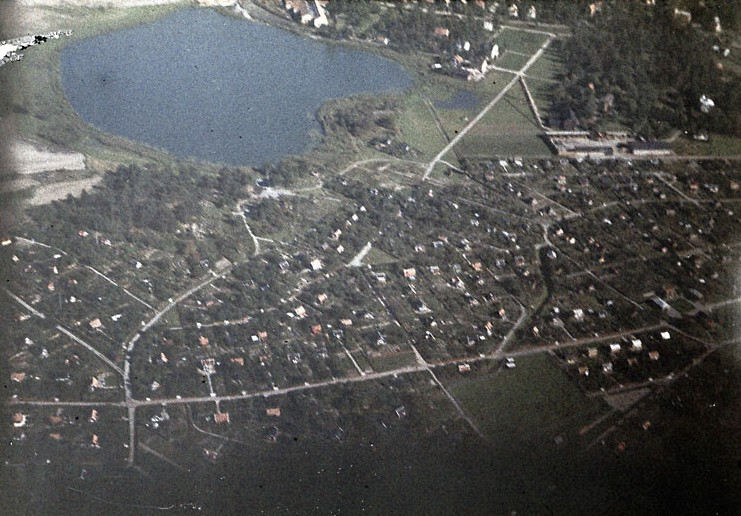
- Lillsjön 1920-1930

- Location within Stockholm
- Coordinates: 59°20′28.66″N 17°57′25.93″E
- Primary inflows: Local stormwater
- Primary outflows: Ulvsundasjön
- Catchment area: 104 ha (260 acres)
- Basin countries: Sweden
- Surface area: 10.7 ha (26 acres)
- Average depth: 2 m (6 ft 7 in)
- Max. depth: 3 m (9.8 ft)
- Water volume: 196,000 m^{3} (159 acre⋅ft)
- Residence time: Undocumented
- Settlements: West Stockholm

Lillsjön (Swedish: The Small Lake) is a small lake in Bromma, a suburb of Stockholm, Sweden. It is one of four lakes in the western suburbs, along with Kyrksjön, Judarn, and Råcksta Träsk. Located in the small park Lillsjöparken and surrounded by heavily trafficked artery roads on all sides, it is rich in nutrients with high levels of metals in the sediments. Prospects are to improve the water quality to keep the lake as a locale for birds.

== Catchment area ==
Lillsjön is a small and shallow lake connected to Ulvsundasjön through a channel, and the flow is periodically reversed with water pouring into the lake. Half of the catchment area is composed of forest and open terrain, part of series of parks constituting a local recreational resource. Heavily trafficked roads take up some 4 per cent and settlements (including allotment-gardens) approximately 20 per cent of the surface. The lake is considered as of great recreational value but of moderate natural importance, except as a breeding locale for many fish species in Lake Mälaren. Motorboats are prohibited in the lake.

The lake is surrounded by the deciduous forest and lawns of the park Lillsjöparken. Three allotment-gardens are found near the lake and 11 ha of the catchment area is occupied by one-family houses. While the inflow from the surrounding area contributed some 200,000 m³ annually, even small variations in water level in Lake Mälaren are of greater importance. Three major artery roads and a ground-level metro track stretches through the area of which Bromma Airport forms a minor part.

=== Environmental influences ===
North and east of the lake are a petrol station and other operations considered as having a negative environmental impact. Until the mid-1980s, the lake received considerable amounts of spillway overflow which resulted in high levels of coliform bacteria. A waste water accident in 1997 caused considerable amounts of polluted water to leak into the lake, but since 2001 waste water only reaches the lake during sustained periods of rain. Low levels of oxygen causes levels of phosphorus to rise in the bottom of the lake during winters and during summers when the lake is stratified. Run-off water from surrounding roads reaches the lake through the ditch dug when the park was created. Most of the nitrogen and more than half of the phosphorus stems from settlements in the area, while allotment gardens, generally lacking sewers, contribute nutrients. Industrial and other operations contribute zinc and copper. The lake's sediments have high levels of copper and nickel, and deeper sediments contain very high levels of organic compounds such as PAHs and PCB.

=== Images ===
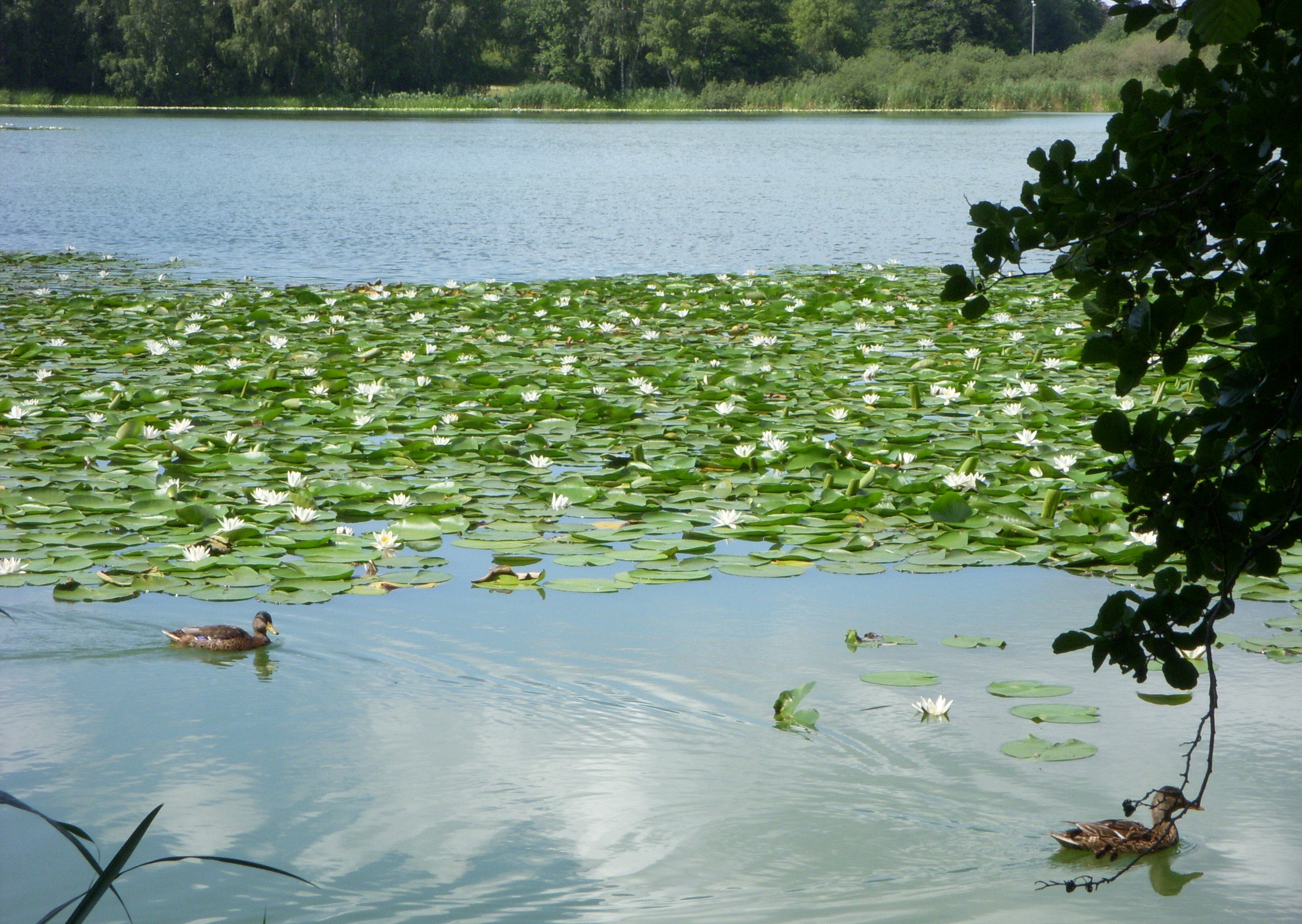

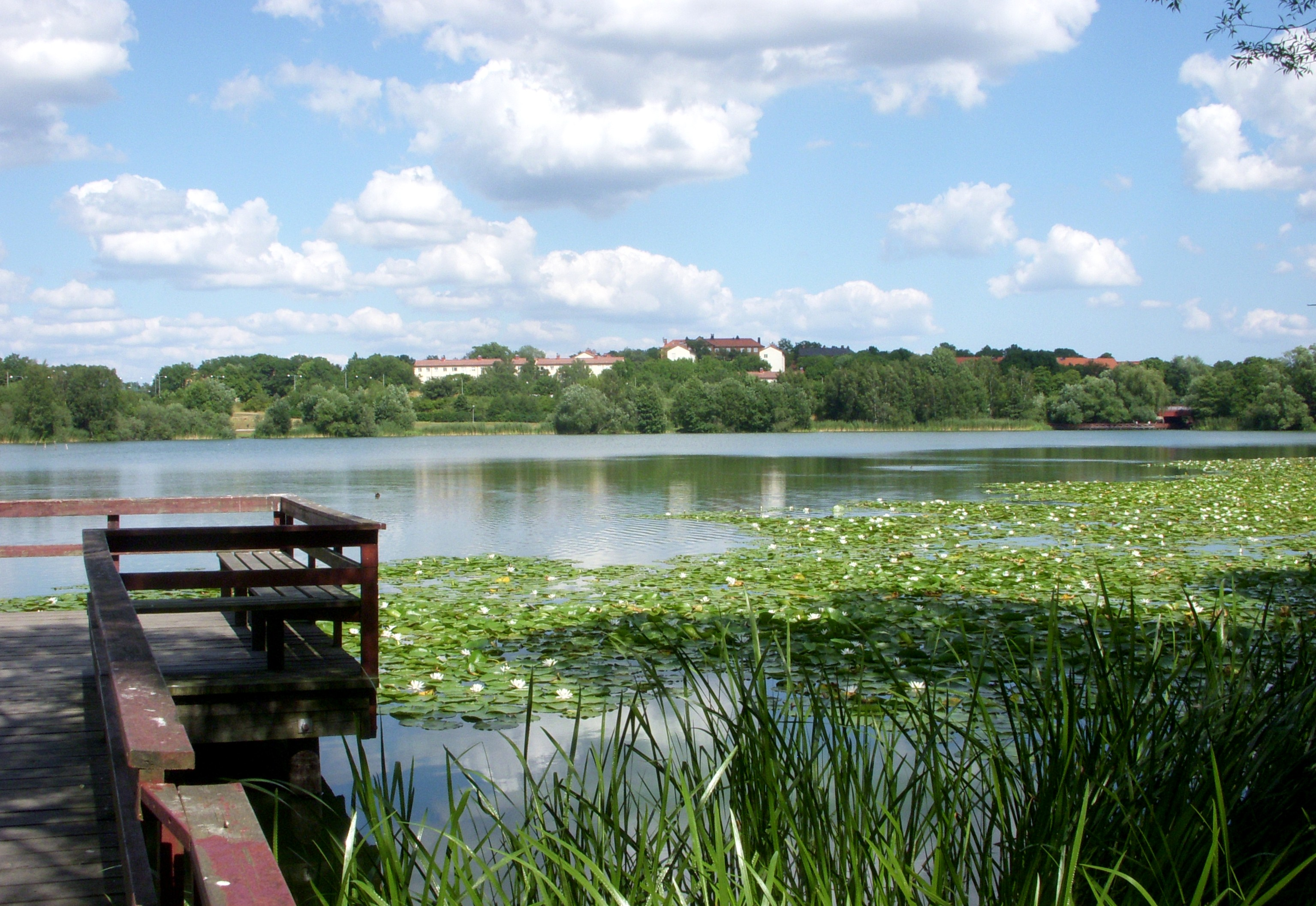

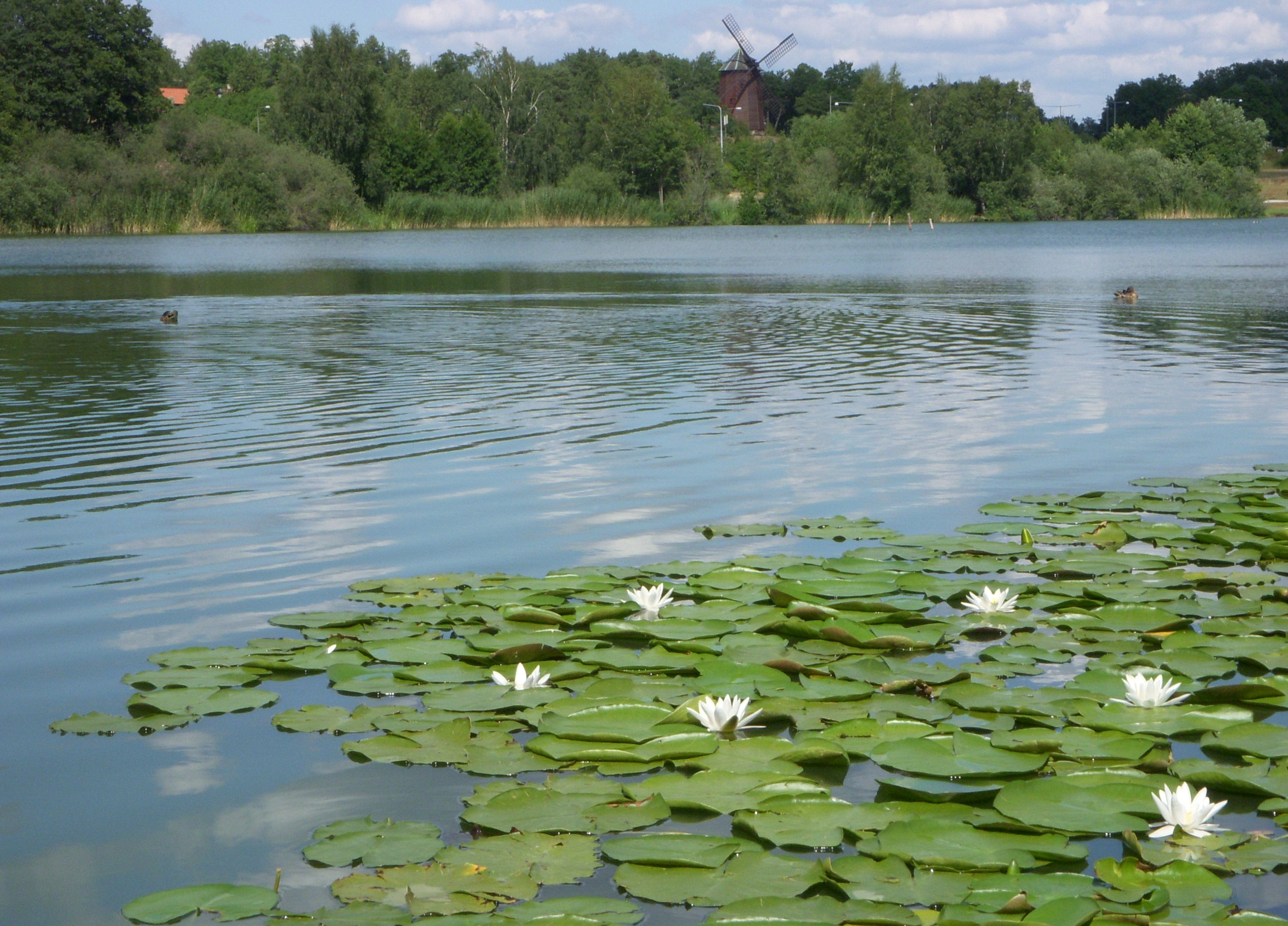

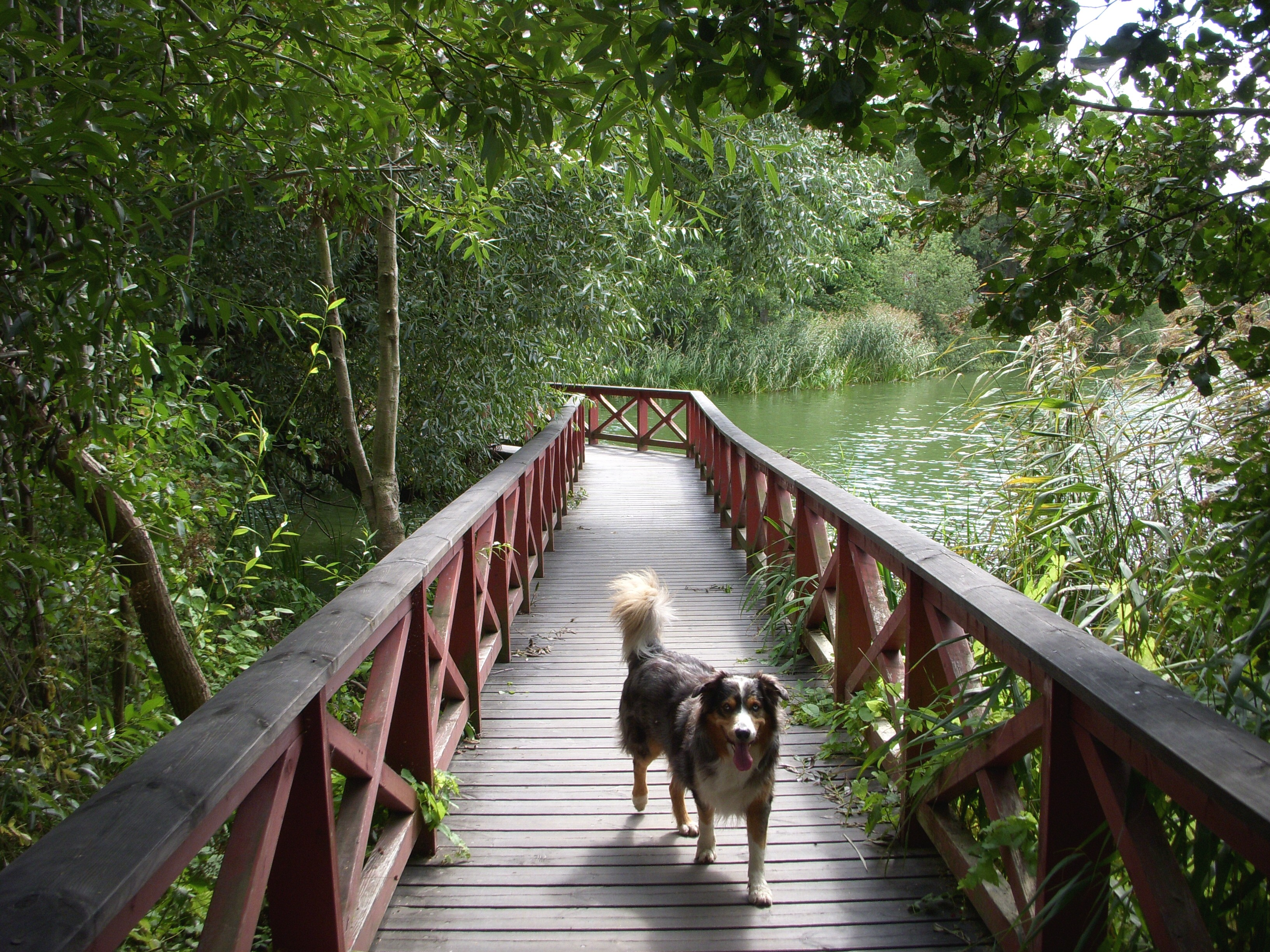

== Flora and fauna ==
In late summers, the lake is dominated by various cyanobacteria. The only zooplankton recorded are rotifers. No inventory of aquatic plants have been made since 1976, but the lake shares are dominated by reed with water lilies found in the southern part. Ten fish species were recorded in 1997-1998, including perch, northern pike, carp bream, and pikeperch. Signal crayfish is occasionally found in the lake. The most commonly breeding bird mallard is accompanied by Eurasian coot and great crested grebe. Several other species are found in the reeds, including reed warbler and reed bunting, and many other regularly uses the lake as a stopover. Common frog has been recorded in the lake.

== Visiting ==
While the lake by itself is mostly of local interest, there are various historical structures in the surrounding area making it popular for promenades, including petroglyphs, runestones, the 17th century Ulvsunda Palace, and several 19th-century mansions and other buildings considered of great local interest. The nearest metro station is Abrahamsberg.

== See also ==
- Geography of Stockholm
- Lakes in Sweden
- Ulvsunda
