= Kungens Kurva =

Building in Huddinge Municipality, Stockholm County, Sweden

Coordinates: 59.268°N 17.911°E

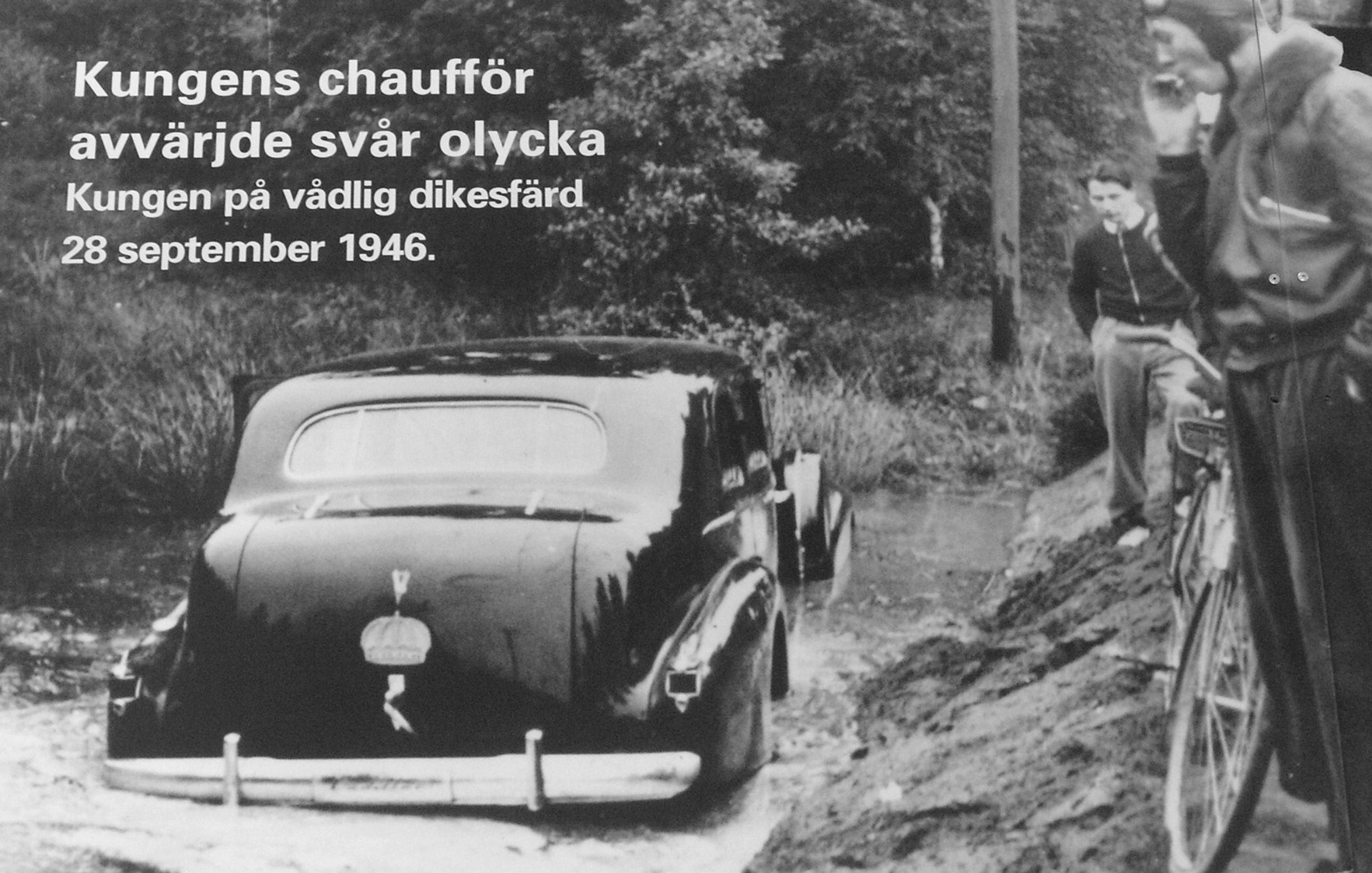
The incident that named the area, King Gustav V's Cadillac in a ditch.

Kungens Kurva (lit. 'The King's Bend' or 'The King's Curve') is a part of Huddinge Municipality, in Metropolitan Stockholm, Sweden, 20 km south of the city. The area got its name on 28 September 1946, when King Gustav V's chauffeur-driven 1939 Cadillac skidded off the road and ended up in a ditch (the King was uninjured). The name later became official.

The area has a large retail park, with stores such as supermarkets, electronics/hardware retailers and the world's third largest IKEA store, with, since a 2014 expansion, a total area of 63,200 square meters. It is close to Skärholmen metro station, which provides access to Stockholm.

== The King's accident ==
King Gustav V, First Master of the Horse Duke Charles d’Otrante, Baron Carl von Essen and Count Nils Gyldenstolpe were on their way home from a hunt on the estate of Tullgarn Castle in Hölö on the afternoon of Saturday 28 September 1946. Their car was being driven by Gösta Ledin, who was standing in for the King’s regular chauffeur. Ledin was travelling at 65 kilometres per hour when he lost control of the car, a 1939 Cadillac Series 75 Fleetwood Sedan. After a long right-hand bend where Gamla Södertäljevägen turned towards the municipality of Segeltorp, the royal car skidded off the road and came to a halt some twenty metres further on in a water-filled ditch.

Ledin later explained, “Suddenly I felt the road give way and that we were heading down the embankment.” Thanks to his high hunting boots, the King managed to get ashore with dry feet, whilst his fellow passengers got their feet wet when the car door was opened. The King took it all in his stride, smoked a cigarette and remarked, “It was a blessing in disguise.” After a while, he was picked up by one of the royal motorcars that had been following behind.

The driver remained at the scene awaiting a recovery vehicle, which was, however, delayed. Meanwhile, Princes Carl and Eugen passed the scene of the accident. Both were on their way home from an opening ceremony in Norrköping; they recognised the royal car and feared a serious accident. By then it had become evening, as can be seen from some of the press photographs, which were taken with a powerful flash. The Cadillac was eventually towed out of the ditch by a lorry from the nearby Wårby Brewery. The car was undamaged but dirty and was able to drive under its own power to Drottningholm Palace.

Reporters from Dagens Nyheter and Svenska Dagbladet were quickly on the scene and photographed the incident. The Swedish News Agency (TT) also had photographs and a report. According to DN, the driver had “a hectic time with all the questions raining down” from curious locals. However, everyone agreed that the road was dangerous and in poor condition, and felt that Ledin should be awarded a medal for his composure and skilful manoeuvre. In their Sunday editions on 29 September, both DN and SvD featured an article about the incident on the front page. DN: “Royal car in the ditch in Segeltorp – The King stepped out dry-shod after car skidded into a marshy pool”.[4] SvD: “The King on a perilous journey through the ditch – Cool-headed driver averted a serious accident”.

== Alleged causes of the accident ==
In the 1950s rumours began to circulate about how ‘The King’s Bend’ was said to have gotten its name: Gustav V, who was sitting in the front seat, became too intrusive towards his chauffeur, who became distracted and drove off the road.

There was another account of the accident published by Dagens Nyheter exactly 50 years after the event. According to one of the King’s chauffeurs, who was employed at the Royal Court in 1946 and who spoke to Ledin after the incident, the accident was caused by a race between the King’s car and his nephew Prince Gustaf Adolf’s car, which was following behind. The prince and his chauffeur decided to overtake the King at high speed. The King, who was known to enjoy high speeds, was incensed at being overtaken, whereupon Ledin replied: “We’ll catch up with them,” and put his foot down. But instead of getting past the prince’s car, Ledin ended up in the ditch with the King and his entourage.

== Sports ==
The following sports clubs are located in Kungens Kurva:

- Segeltorps IF
