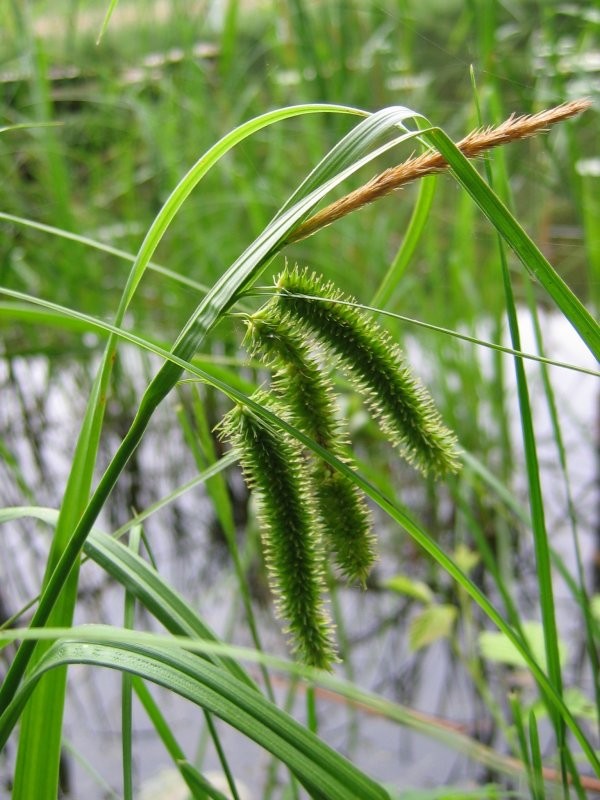
- Male spike (top) and three female spikes (bottom)

Conservation status
- Least Concern (IUCN 3.1)

Scientific classification
- Kingdom: Plantae
- Clade: Tracheophytes
- Clade: Angiosperms
- Clade: Monocots
- Clade: Commelinids
- Order: Poales
- Family: Cyperaceae
- Genus: Carex
- Subgenus: Carex subg. Carex
- Section: Carex sect. Vesicariae
- Species: C. pseudocyperus

Binomial name
- Carex pseudocyperus L.

= Carex pseudocyperus =

Species of grass-like plant

Carex pseudocyperus is a species of flowering plant in the sedge family known by the common name cyperus sedge or hop sedge. It grows in marshes, swamps, and the margins of ponds, rivers and canals. The stems can be up to 90 centimetres (35 in) with one male spike and 3 to 5 pendulous female spikes, and bright yellow-green leaves to 1.2 metres (3 ft 11 in).
