= Hässelby =

District in Stockholm, Sweden

Coordinates: 59°22′43.15″N 17°48′48.06″E

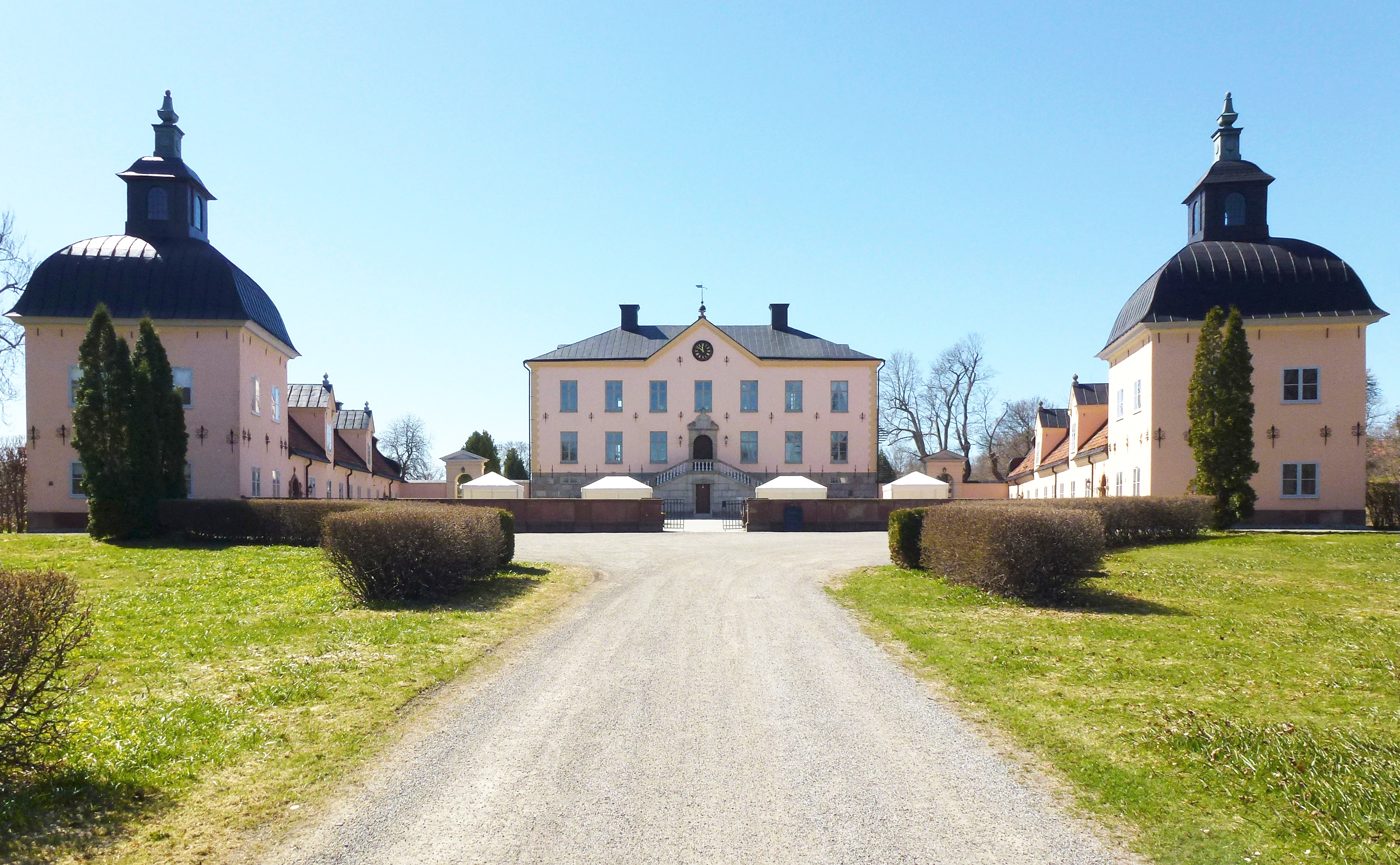
Hässelby Castle, built in the 1650s.

Hässelby is a Swedish town that is a part of Hässelby-Vällingby in the city of Stockholm, Sweden. It contains the suburban areas of Hässelby Gård, Hässelby Strand and Hässelby Villastad, and its territory also corresponds to Hässelby Parish in the Church of Sweden. Hässelby SK is the town's local sports club. Hässelby is close to Grimsta Nature Reserve and Lambarfjärden which offers a combination of city life and experiences in nature.

== In popular culture ==
Hässelby, a 2007 novel by the Norwegian author Johan Harstad, takes place largely in its titular suburb. The plot of the book surrounds an adult version of Alfie Atkins
