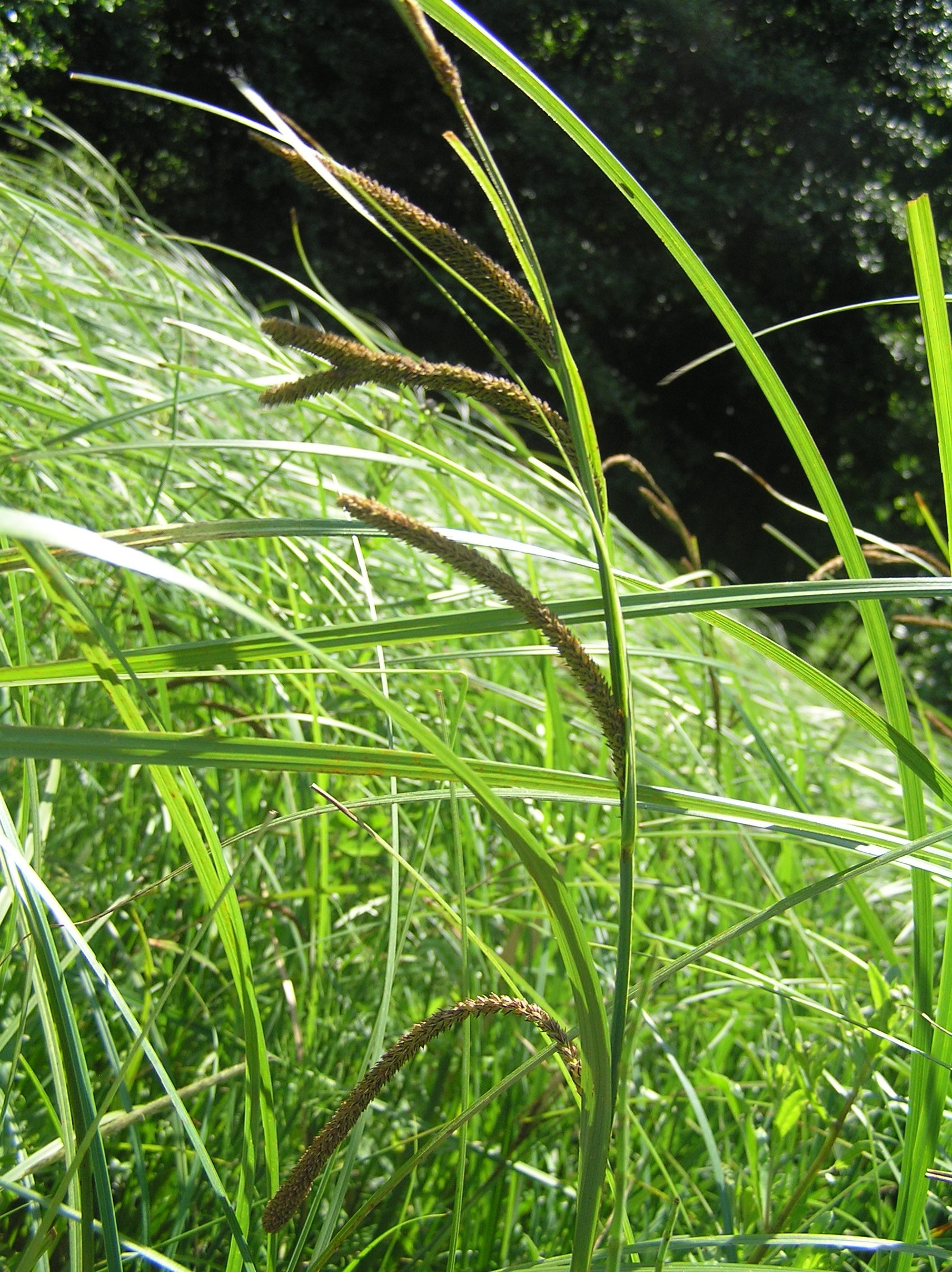

Conservation status
- Least Concern (IUCN 3.1)

Scientific classification
- Kingdom: Plantae
- Clade: Tracheophytes
- Clade: Angiosperms
- Clade: Monocots
- Clade: Commelinids
- Order: Poales
- Family: Cyperaceae
- Genus: Carex
- Species: C. acuta

Binomial name
- Carex acuta L.

Synonyms
- List: Carex acuta f. prolixa (Fries) Sylven Carex fuscovaginata Kük Carex graciliformis V.I. Krecz. Carex gracilis R. Br Carex prolixa Carex saxatilis laxa (Trautv.) Kalela Carex stricta Gooden., non Lam. Carex hudsonii A.Benn.

= Carex acuta =

Species of grass-like plant

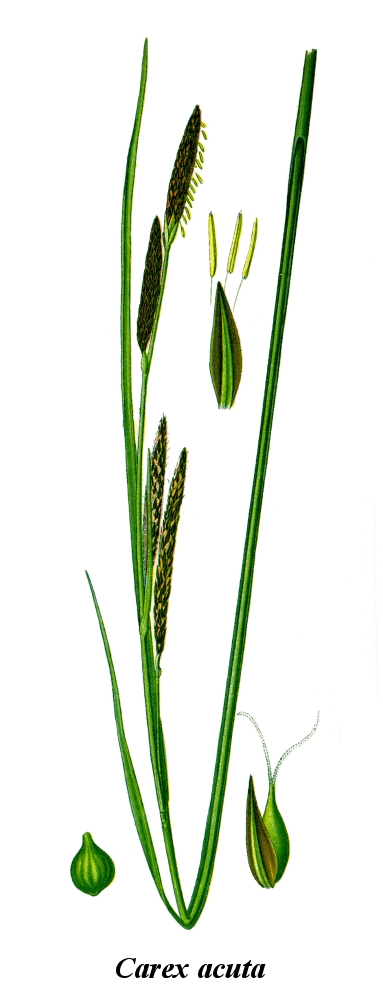
Illustration of Carex acuta

Carex acuta (common names acute sedge, slender tufted-sedge, or slim sedge) is a perennial, tussock-forming plant in the Carex, or sedge family.

== Description ==
Carex acuta is a tuft-forming, slender, rhizomatous plant with narrow, flat leaves reaching up to 90 cm in height. Stems are three-angled. Inflorescence is a spike, with brown flowers appearing in late spring and summer.

== Distribution and habitat ==
It can be found growing on the margins of rivers and lakes in the Palaearctic terrestrial ecoregions in beds of wet, alkaline or slightly acid depressions with mineral soil.

Carex acuta does not tolerate prolonged desiccation. The community is distributed, in particular, in northern France, the Low Countries, Central Europe south to the Sava and Drava valleys of Croatia, the northern Morava valley of Serbia and Romania, north to Poland, the Kaliningrad District, Lithuania and Latvia, in southern Scandinavia, in the Dnieper basin of northern Ukraine and southern Belarus, in the lower Volga Valley.
