= Agneta Wrede's vestibule =

Decorated room in Sweden's Åkeshov Palace

Coordinates: 59.34083°N 17.92472°E

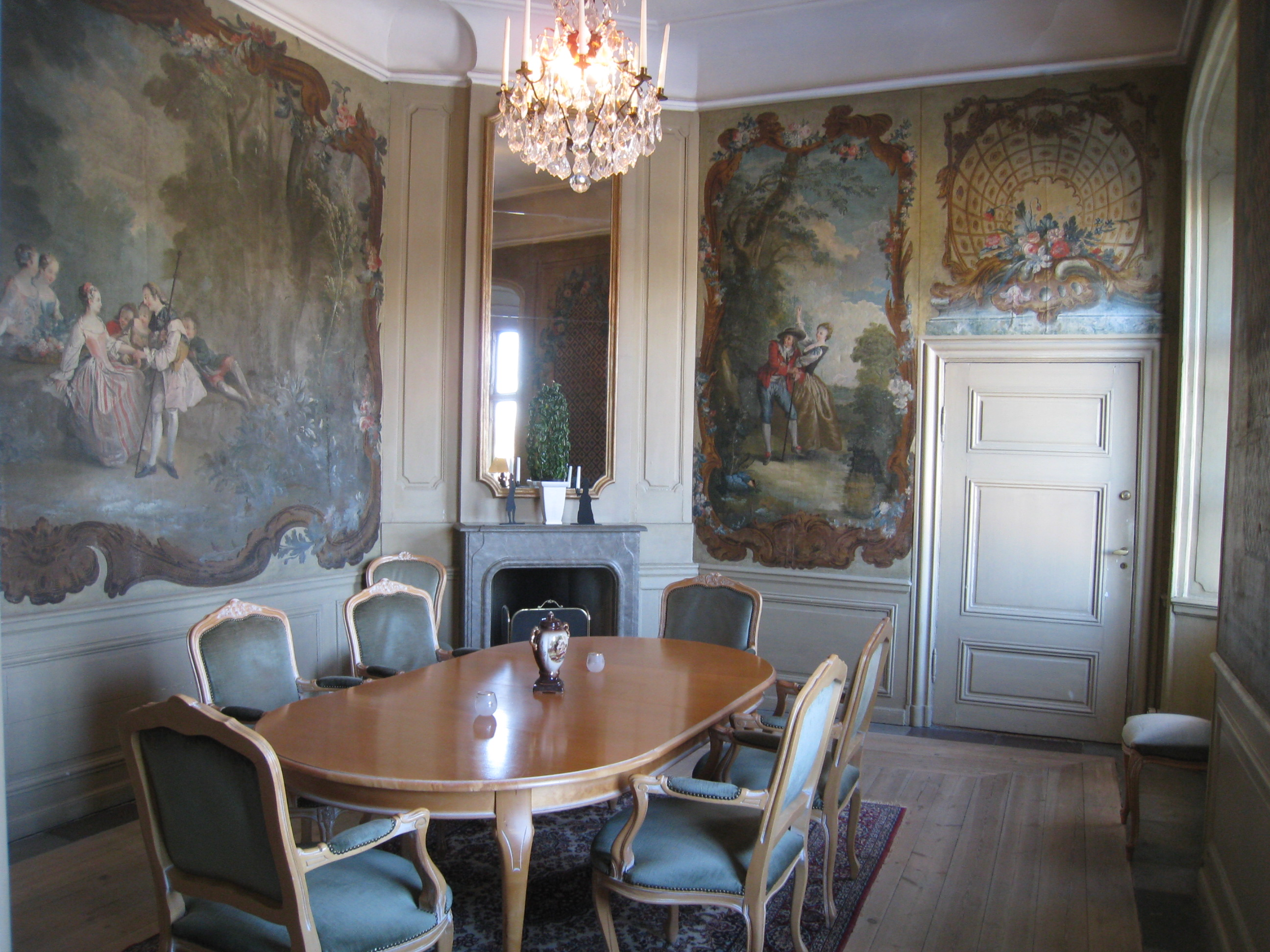
Agneta Wrede's vestibule with the painted wall fields

Agneta Wrede's vestibule is a room in the upper floor of Åkeshov Palace in Bromma, outside Stockholm, Sweden. The room is named after Baroness Agneta Wrede af Elimä (1718–1800), and who lived in the palace during 1747–1800. The room is richly decorated and painted in Rococo style. The decoration of the suite depicts a rural idyll. The entire interior remains authentic.

== History ==
In 1720, Åkeshov palace was bought by the at the time Chancellor of Justice, Baron Gabriel Stierncrona, who converted it with subordinate farms in Spånga and Järfälla parishes. The next owner was the then only eight-year-old son David.

The paintings in Agneta Wrede's vestibule were stored at the beginning of the 20th century, but were later found after many years in the attic of St. Erik's hospital.

Stockholm City Museum spearheaded an effort to return the paintings to their original setting. During the restoration, Agneta Wrede's vestibule were restored and the paintings in the upper hall skillfully copied by the artist John Broberg and Brita Juel-Soop.

== Gallery ==
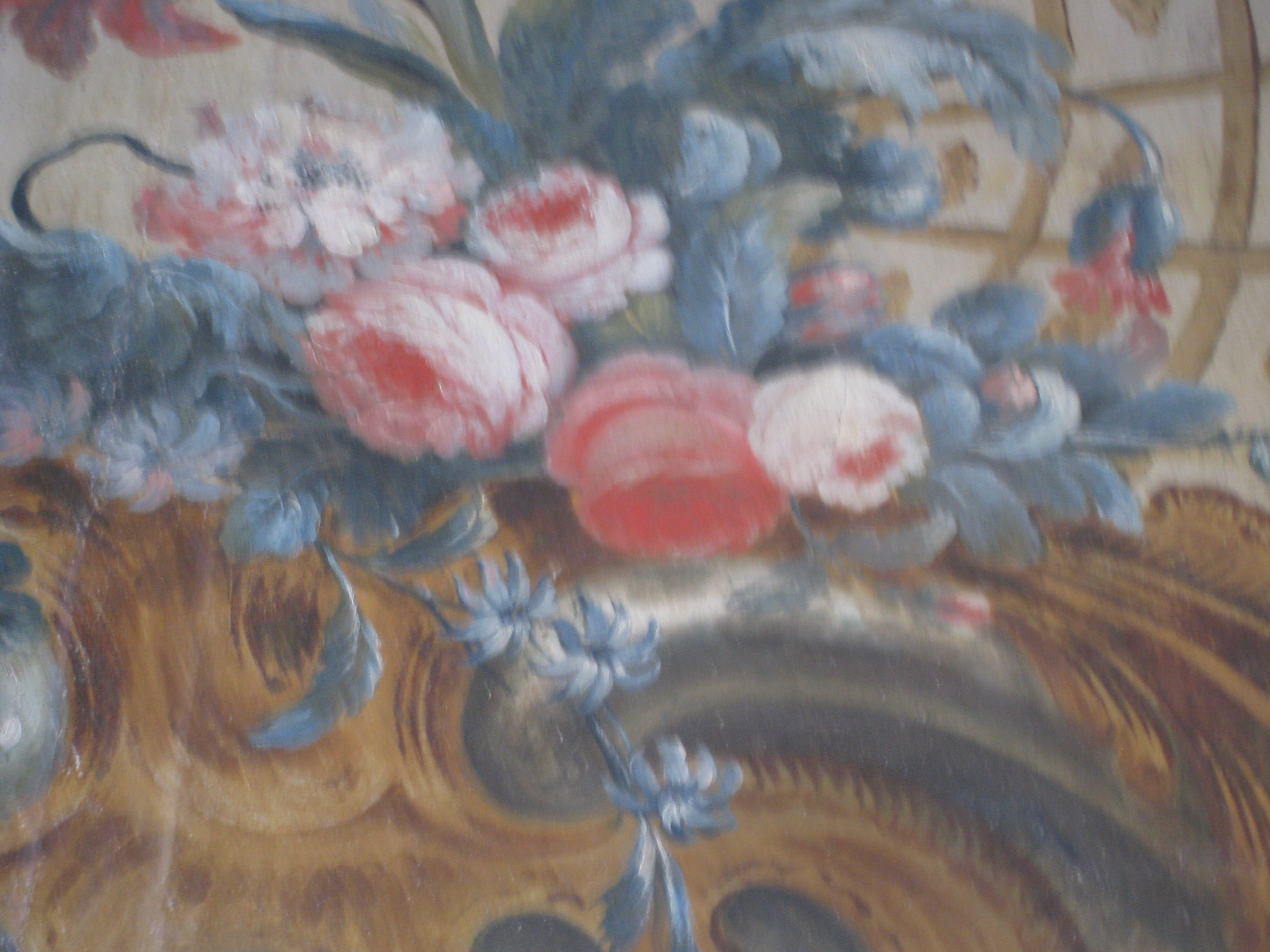
Agneta Wrede's atrium

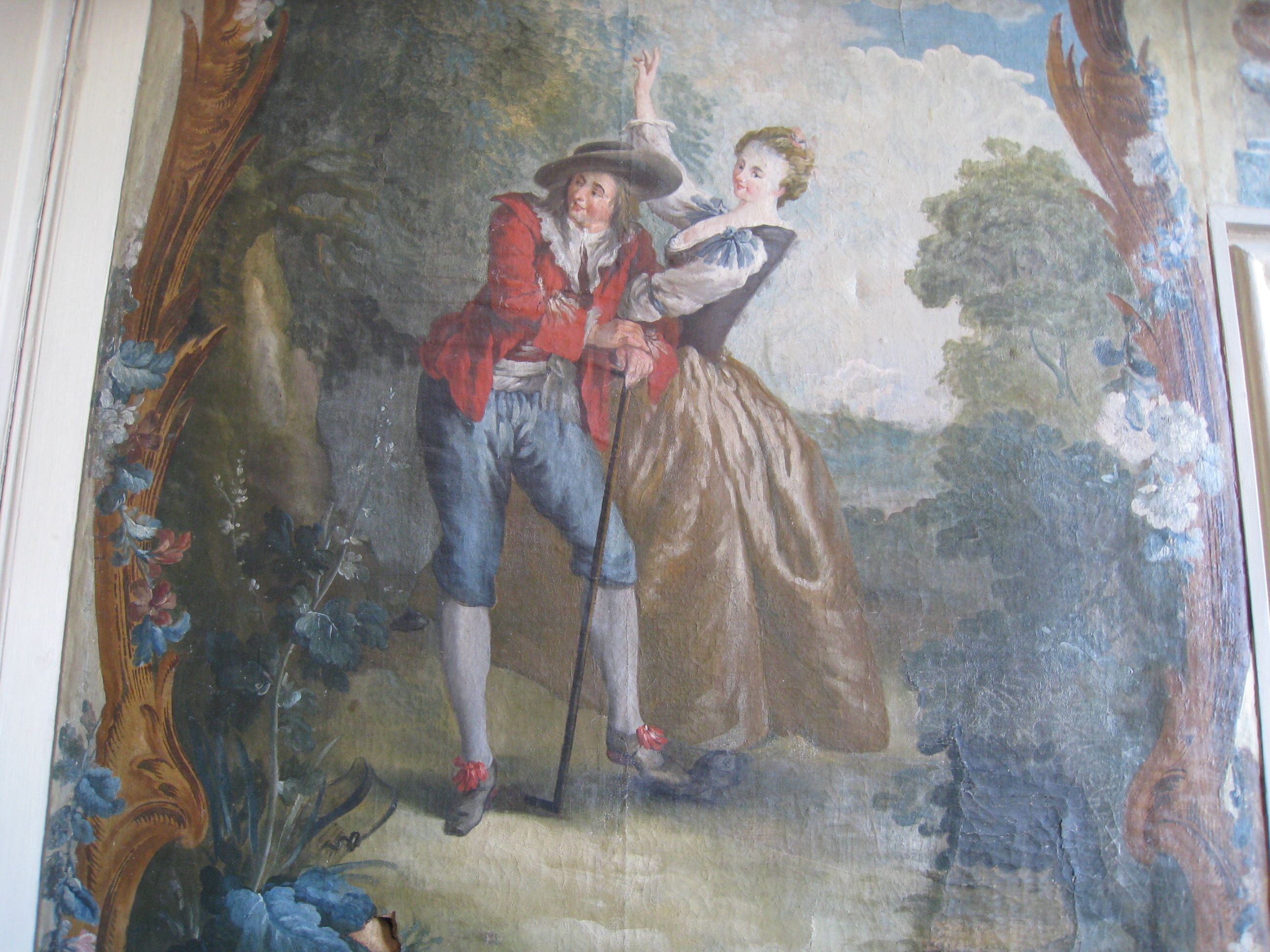
Agneta Wrede's atrium 2

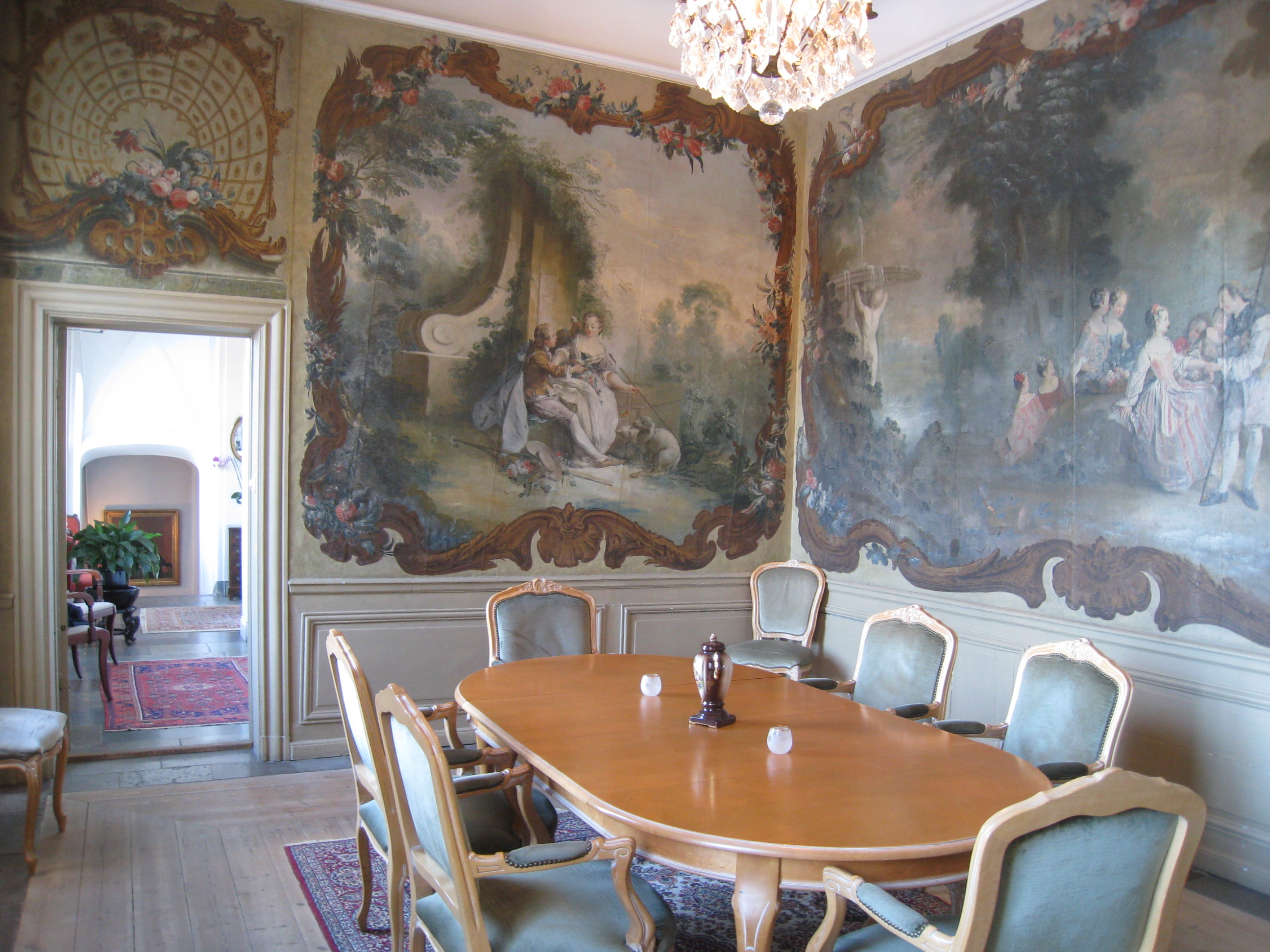
The eastern part with the long wall

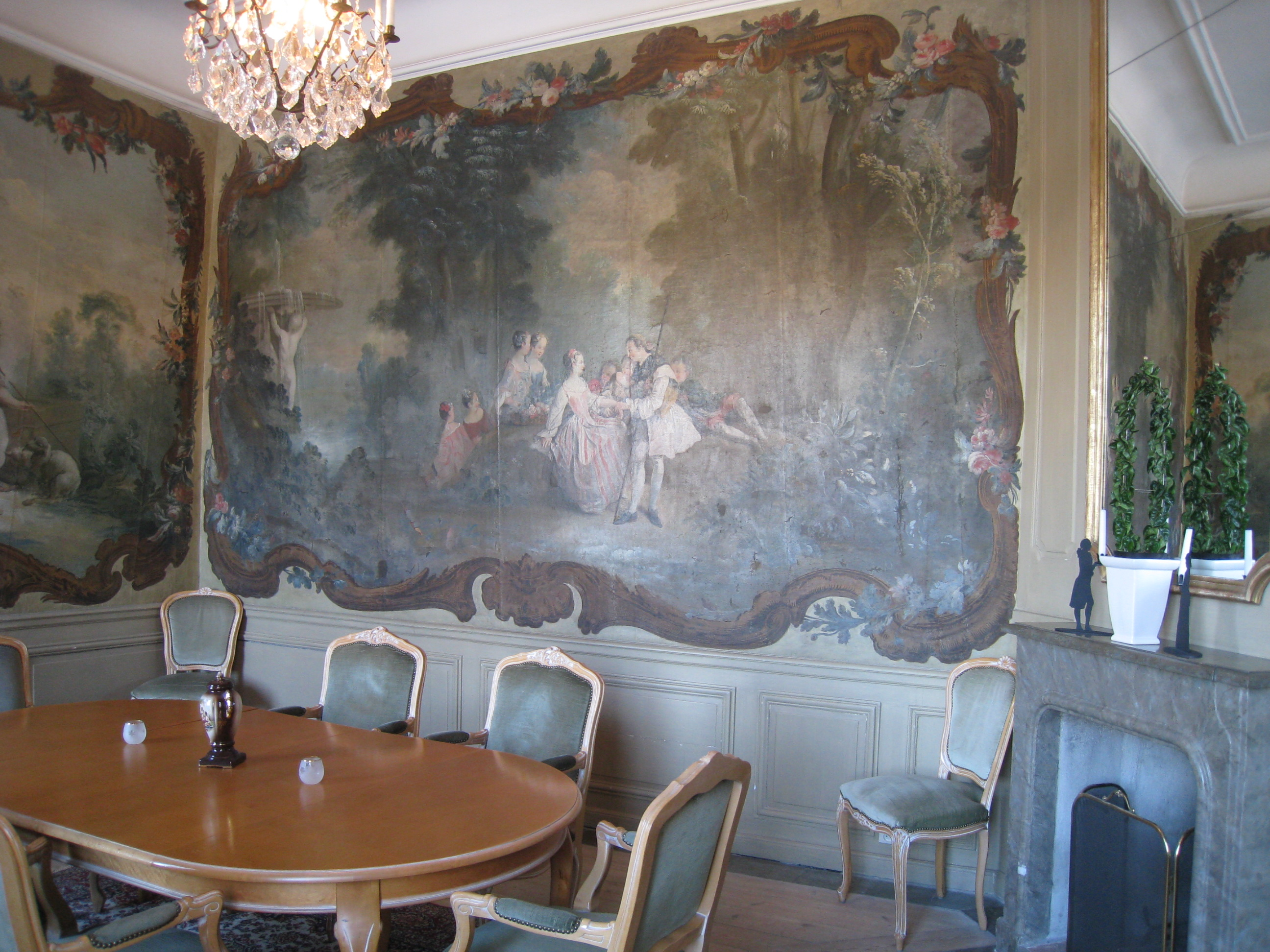
The long wall

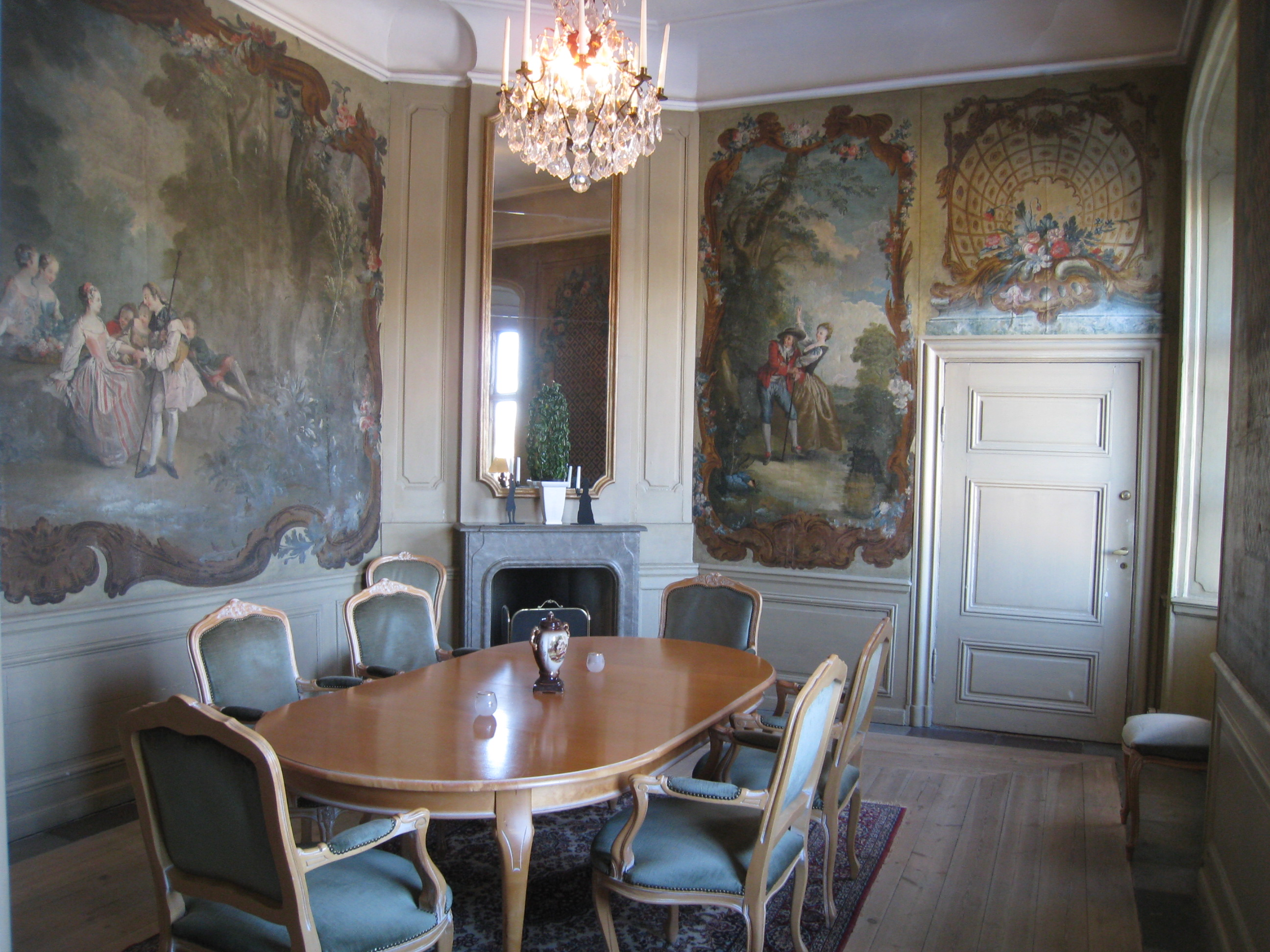
The western part
