= Elisabeth Stierncrona =

18th-century Swedish countess and writer

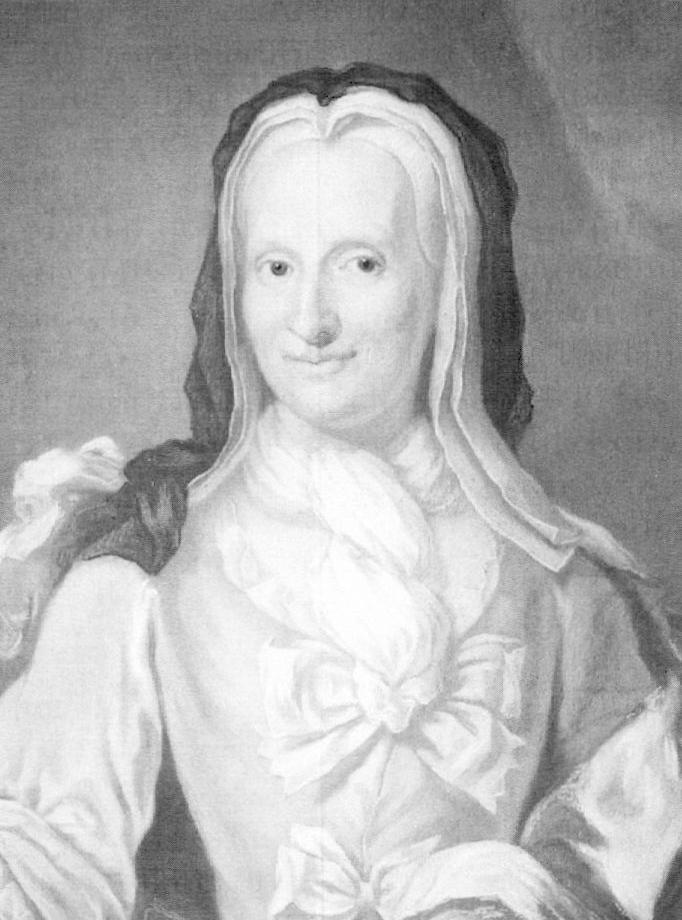
Elisabeth Stierncrona (1714-1769)

Elisabeth Stierncrona (9 January 1714 – 28 June 1769) was a Swedish countess and writer.

== Life ==
Elisabeth Stierncrona was born in Stockholm. Her parents were Baron Gabriel Stierncrona (1669-1723) and Antoinetta Maria Amija (1687-1721). She married Count Fredrik Gyllenborg (1698-1759), courtier and a leading member of the Hats (party), on the 27 April 1729. She had nine children during her marriage. As was still a custom in the Swedish aristocracy of the time, she kept her original name after marriage. Her education is unknown, but it is clear that she had a wide knowledge within Christianity and politics. Both her own family and that of her spouse were very wealthy.

The first of her published works were the political work En swensks tankar öfwer den 22 Junii 1756 (The Thoughts of a Swede regarding the events of the 22 June 1756). The subjects were the recent failed attempt of Queen Louisa Ulrika to stage a coup d'état to overthrow the parliament and the political system of the Age of Liberty and reintroduce absolute monarchy (Coup of 1756). In it she defended the current system against royal dictatorship with religious quotations. In parallel, her daughter Anna Antoinetta Gyllenborg also wrote a known political work Den kära frändens skål (1755).

Though her published works were formally anonymously published, she was well known to be the writer. Except for her published work, she has become known for the unpublished work Råd till mina barn (Advice to My Children), 274 pages of advice to her surviving children to how they should live their lives, written in 1760–1763.

During the later years of her spouse, his political career had begun to decline, which caused severe economical difficulties as he had abused his position in politics by mixing his private economy with that of the state during adventurous business projects and taken considerable loans which he was not able to repay. When he died in 1759, Elisabeth Stierncrona retired to the estate Uttersberg and was left with great debts which the estate could not repay. She tried to save her own dowry and the inheritance of her children. She failed and she was accused of creating false accounts and she was declared bankrupt in 1766. She died in Stockholm.

== Works ==
1. En swensks tankar öfwer den 22 junii 1756. Sthlm 1756. (Grefing). 64 s. 8:o. [Anon.], political work
2. Marie bästa del, eller Thet ena nödwän-diga (1-2, 1756–60), psalm book
