= Gabriel Stierncrona =

17th-century Swedish civil servant and nobleman

Friherre Gabriel Stierncrona
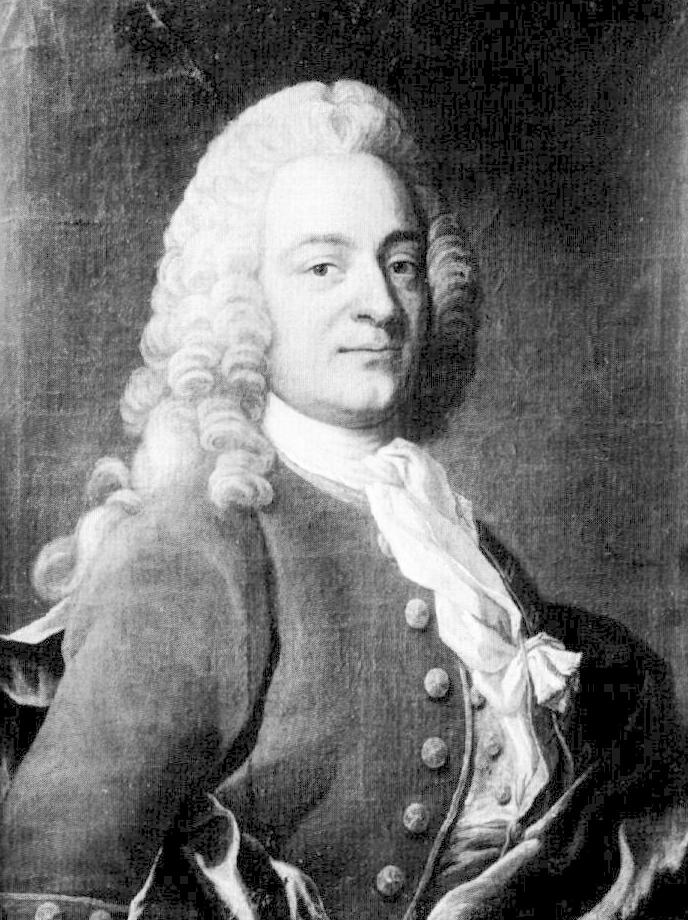
- Portrait of Gabriel Stierncrona (1669-1723) by Olof Arenius

President of the Svea Court of Appeal
- In office 2 September 1723 – 8 September 1723
- Monarch: Frederick I
- Preceded by: Carl Gyllenstierna
- Succeeded by: Pehr Scheffer

1st Chancellor of Justice
- In office 1719–1723
- Monarchs: Ulrika Eleonora, Frederick I
- Preceded by: Office created
- Succeeded by: Thomas Fehman

Personal details
- Born: Gabriel Welt; September 28, 1669 Uppsala, Sweden
- Died: September 8, 1723 (aged 53) Stockholm, Sweden
- Resting place: Bromma Church, Stockholm
- Spouse: Antoinetta Maria Amya
- Children: 7 (including Elisabeth Stierncrona and David Stierncrona)
- Parents: Per Larsson Welt (father); Elsa Stensdotter Lindemarck (mother)
- Education: Uppsala University
- Occupation: Civil servant, nobleman

Gabriel Stierncrona (born Welt; 28 September, 1669 – 8 September, 1723) was a Swedish civil servant and baron. A legal administrator during the late Stormaktstiden and the early Age of Liberty, he served as the first chancellor of justice from 1719 to 1723, and briefly as president of the Svea Court of Appeal in 1723.

Beyond his judicial career, Stierncrona co-founded the Stjärnsund manufactory alongside inventor Christopher Polhem.

== Early life ==
Gabriel Welt was born in Uppsala on 28 September 1669. He was born to Per Larsson Welt and Elsa Stensdotter Lindemarck. Per had served in various administrative and military roles. The Welts were a commoner family that had German roots. All of his siblings were ennobled, with his elder brother Lars being ennobled Stierncrona no.1384 and his younger brother Peter being ennobled Stierncrona af Söderby no. 1679.

In 1683, Welt enrolled in Uppsala University.

== Legal career ==
Portrait of Stierncrona

Welt began his legal career in 1691 as an auscultant in the Svea Court of Appeal. He left the position in 1694 to serve as district judge of Tjust. In 1696, he then served as district judge in Sotholms, Svartlösa and Öknebo in Södertörn Domsaga.

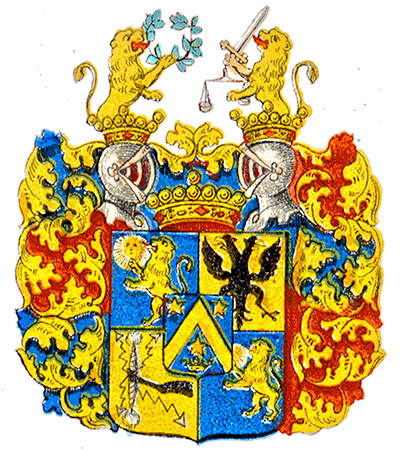
Coat of arms of the Stierncrona family

Stierncrona was ennobled with his brother Lars in 1699. He took the surname Stierncrona, and his descendants would be the Stierncrona no. 166 family in the House of Nobility.

In 1701, Stierncrona returned to the Svea Court of Appeal as an assessor. In 1705, he became a member of the commission that would later draft the Civil Code of 1734. In 1712, he briefly served as a lawman in Närke. Within a year, he had taken up office as first ombudsman. He was eventually promoted to supreme ombudsman, a position he held from 1714 until its abolition. In 1719, the office of supreme ombudsman was reorganized to the still extant position chancellor of justice, with Stierncrona being made the first holder of the office.

In 1719, after the death of Charles XII, Stierncrona participated in the deliberations that led to the Instrument of Government (1719). He was involved in the disputes over the class division in the nobility at the Riksdag of 1719, arguing for the abolition of the class division between lower and upper nobility. That same year, he was a member of the commission that tried and sentenced Georg Heinrich von Görtz to death in 1719.

Upon the death of Carl Gyllenstierna in 1723, the president of the Svea Court of Appeal became a vacant position. A dispute arose over who would succeed him, with the different estates proposing different candidates, including Stierncrona. He ended up arguing to king Frederick I that the other candidates lacked his legal experience. Stierncrona was appointed the president of the Svea Court of Appeal in 1723, a position he would not hold for long before his death.

== Business career ==
Parallel to his legal career, Stierncrona invested in industry. In 1701, he entered an agreement with Christopher Polhem to finance the creation of Stjärnsund manufactory. The manufactory produced a variety of household goods and building materials such as locks, pots, door fittings and tools for tradesmen. In 1700, the Swedish Board of Mines issued a monopoly for the two, which would last 20 years and exempt them from customs duties and other fees.

== Personal life, titles, and death ==
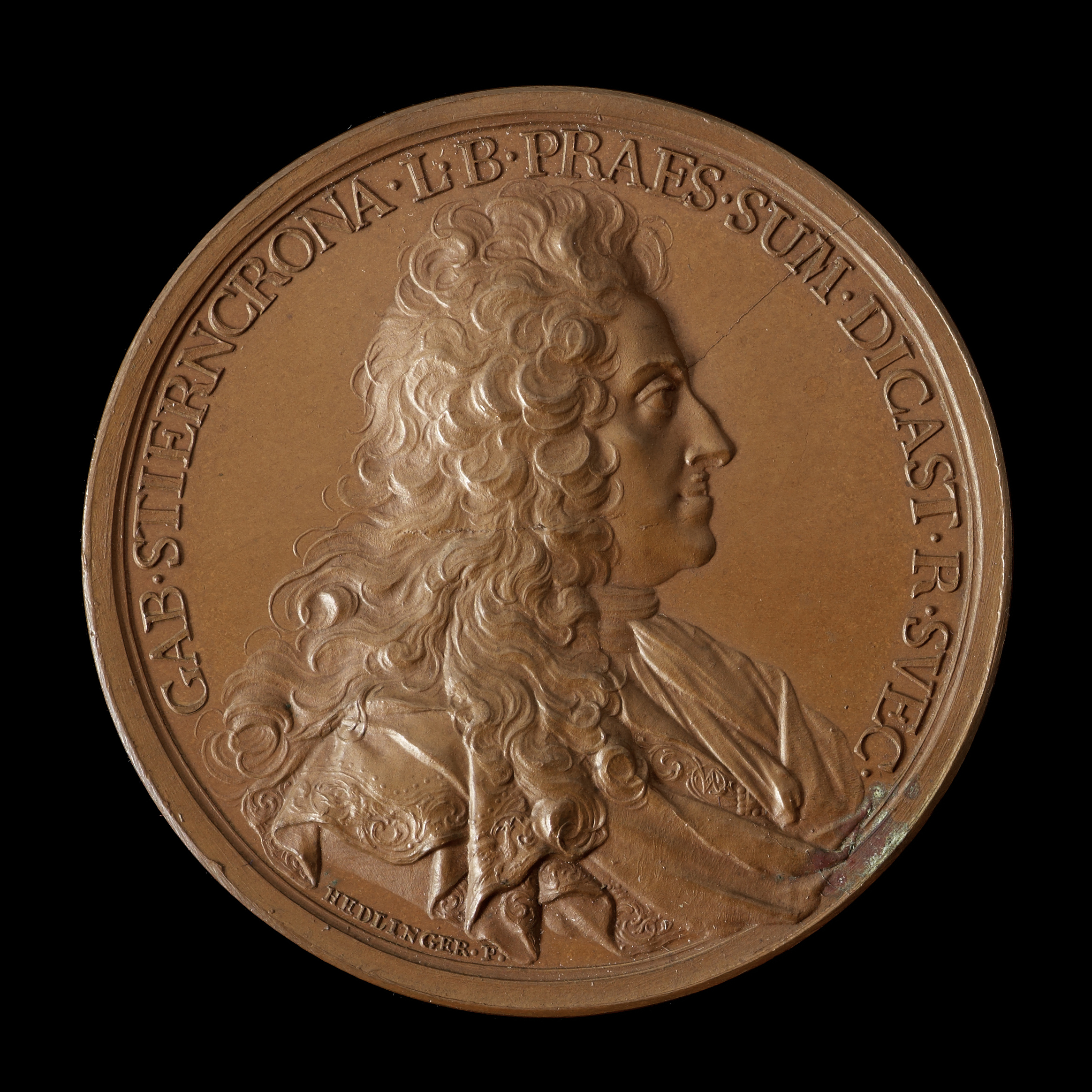
1724 commemorative bronze medallion of Gabriel Stierncrona engraved by Johann Carl Hedlinger

Stierncrona married Antoinetta Maria Amya in 1708. She was the daughter of David Amya and Elisabet von Zabeland. They had seven children, though only three survived to adulthood.

- Gabriel Stierncrona (1709–1710), died in infancy.
- David Gabriel Stierncrona (1711–1711), died in infancy.
- Elisabeth Stierncrona (1714–1769), writer; m. 1729 Count Fredrik Gyllenborg.
- David Stierncrona (1715–1784), chamberlain and Baron of Åkeshov Palace; m. 1747 Baroness Agneta Wrede af Elimä.
- Maria Sofia Stierncrona (1716–1749), m. 1734 Count Henning Adolf Gyllenborg.
- Gabriel Stierncrona (1718–1719), died in infancy.
- Antoinetta Maria Stierncrona (1719–1720), died in infancy.

Stierncrona's primary estate was Åkeshov Palace. He also owned other estates across Sweden. In addition to being Baron of Åkeshov, he was also lord of Söderby, Täckeråker, and Lilla Karby.

Stierncrona died in Stockholm on 8 September 1723 at the age of 53. He is buried at Bromma Church, where he had built a burial chapel. His will established a fideicommiss for Åkeshov Palace.
