= Petrus Astronomus =

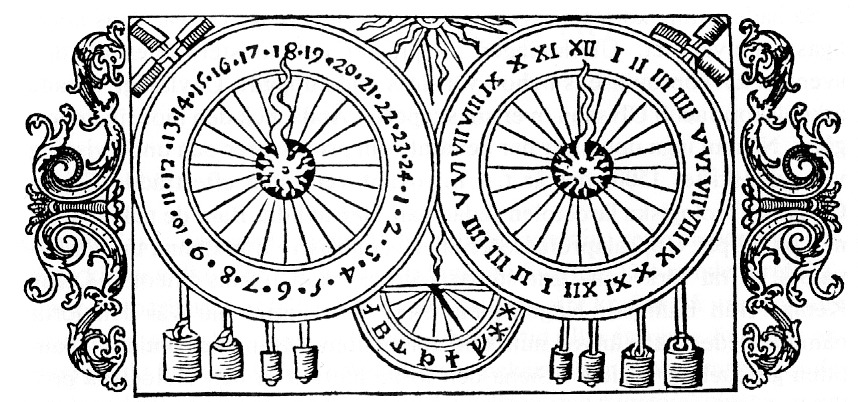
16th-century woodcut from the History of Olaus Magnus, purportedly depicting the astronomical clock in Uppsala Cathedral designed by Brother Petrus.

Petrus Astronomus, O.Ss.S., (died after 1513), a German by birth, was a Bridgettine monk in Vadstena Abbey, Vadstena, Sweden. In 1506, he created an astronomical clock for the Uppsala Cathedral, which, in addition to the hours and minutes of the day, also illustrated the moon phase and the movements of the planets. The clock was repaired by Christopher Polhem in the 17th century but destroyed in a fire in 1702.

He first appears by name as a lecturer in astronomy at Uppsala University, where between 1508 and 1509 he conducted a series of lectures.

He is sometimes erroneously confused for Conrad Dasypodius who constructed the astronomic clockwork in the Strassbourg cathedral.
