= Åkeshov Palace =

Palace in Bromma near Stockholm

Coordinates: 59°20′27″N 17°55′29″E

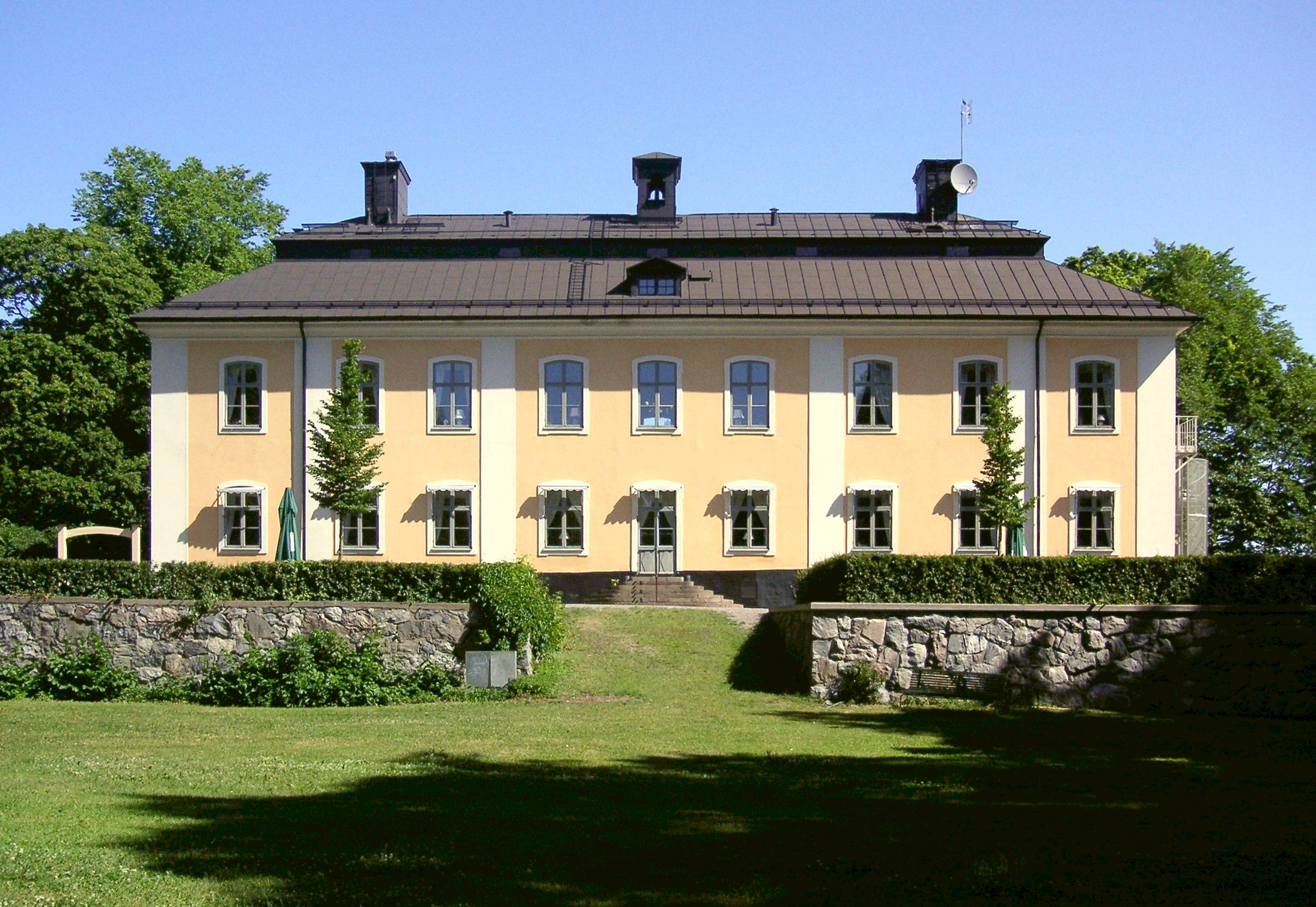
Åkeshov Palace

Åkeshov Palace is located in Bromma, a borough of Stockholm, Sweden. It is located in the Judarskogen nature reserve. Historically, Åkeshov was situated in Bromma socken, which was incorporated with the City of Stockholm in 1916. After having undergone a careful reconstruction, the palace is used today as a hotel and conference facility.

== History ==
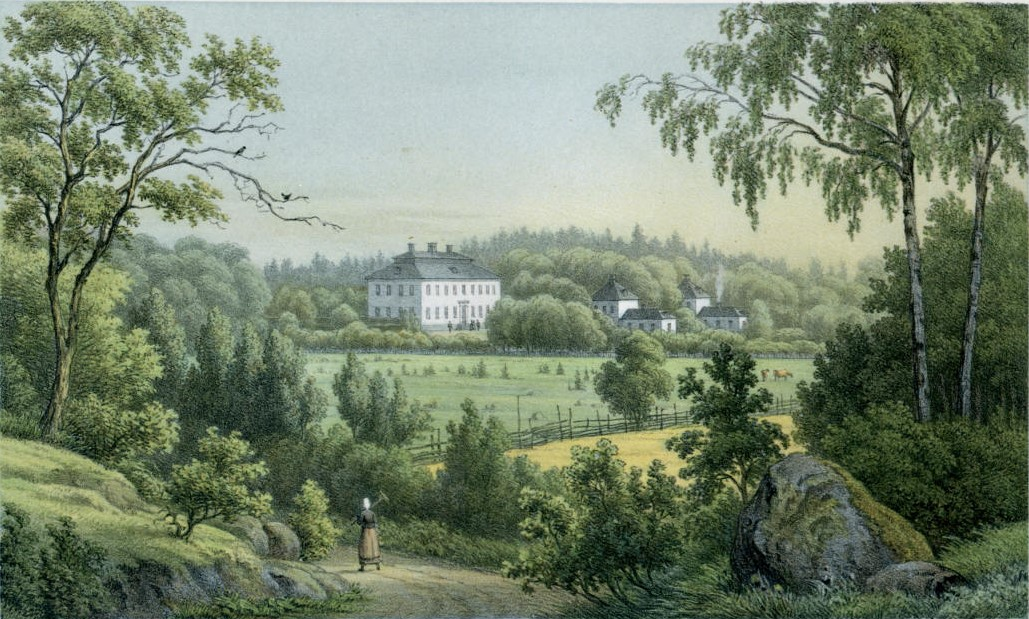
Åkeshovs slott, Bromma (1881) Fredrik Wilhelm Alexander Nay (1822-1883)

The estate of Åkeshov was originally named Nockeby. In the 1400s Stockholm district court judge Peder Ålänning owned the estate. Ålänning was one of his times richest people in Stockholm and sometimes worked as a banker for, among others, King Albert of Sweden and Bo Jonsson (Grip). In 1635, Baron Åke Axelsson (1594–1655) bought the property and in the early 1640s, began building the manor house which had not yet been completed at the time of his death. His daughter Barbro Åkesdotter (1620–1680), wife of Baron Claes Hansson Bielkenstierna (1615–1662), completed the construction. Their daughter Christina Claesdotter Bielkenstierna (1645–1716) inherited the estate in 1662, but lost the property during the Swedish reduction of 1680.

In the years 1690–1720, Åkeshov was owned by members of the Stenbock family, first by Count Johan Gabriel Stenbock (1640–1705) during the years 1690–1705, then by his cousin, Count Erik Gustaf Stenbock (1662–1722) during the years 1705–1720. In 1720, Åkeshov was sold to Baron Gabriel Stierncrona. The palace was rebuilt in several stages, including the years 1723 and 1740 under the direction of architect Carl Hårleman (1700–1753). Two wing buildings were added during the 1740s.

== See also ==
- Agneta Wrede's vestibule, a room in the palace named after Baroness Agneta Wrede af Elimä
- List of castles and palaces in Sweden
