= Stjärnsunds manufakturverk =

Swedish mechanical manufacturing company

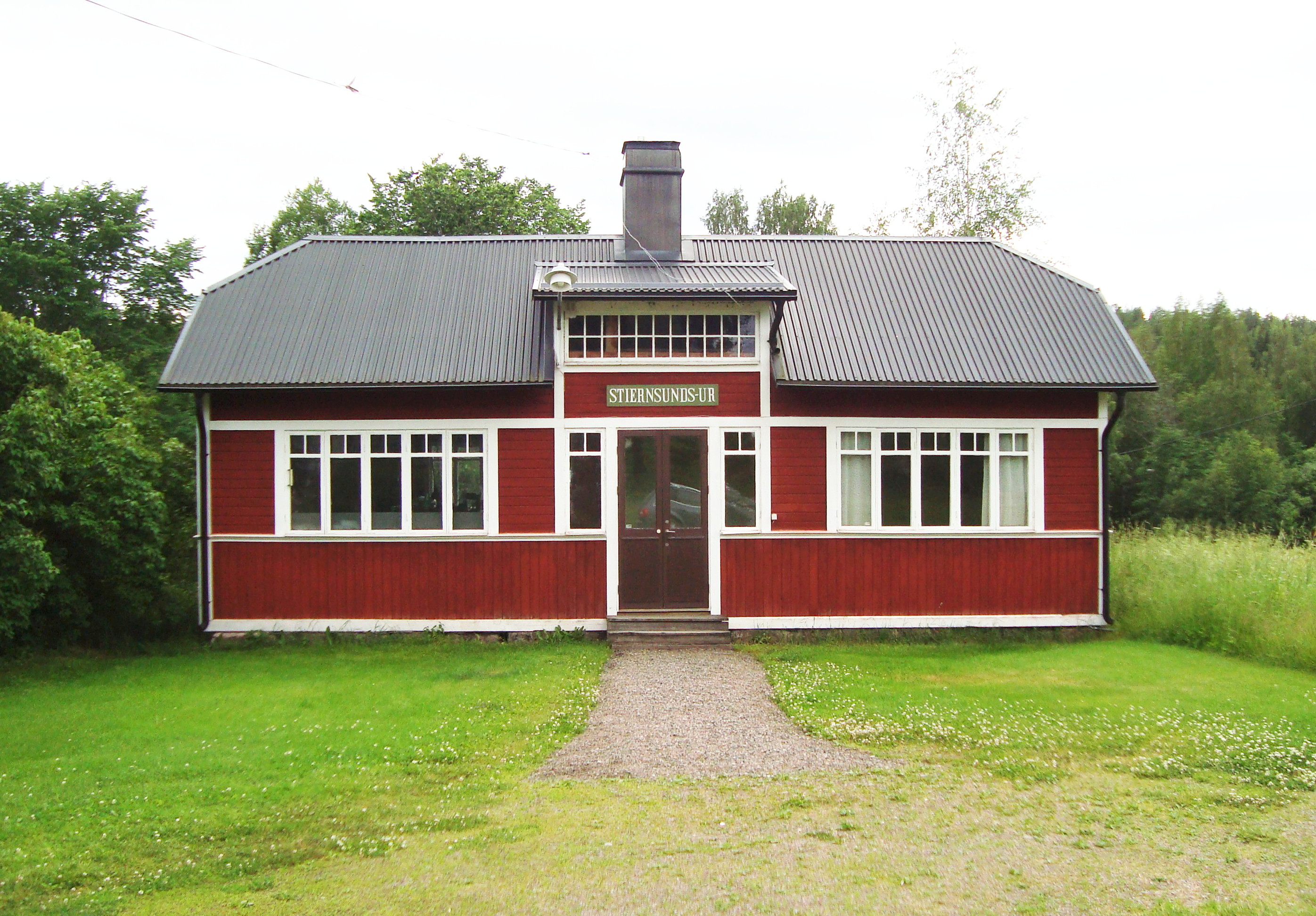
Clock workshop building.

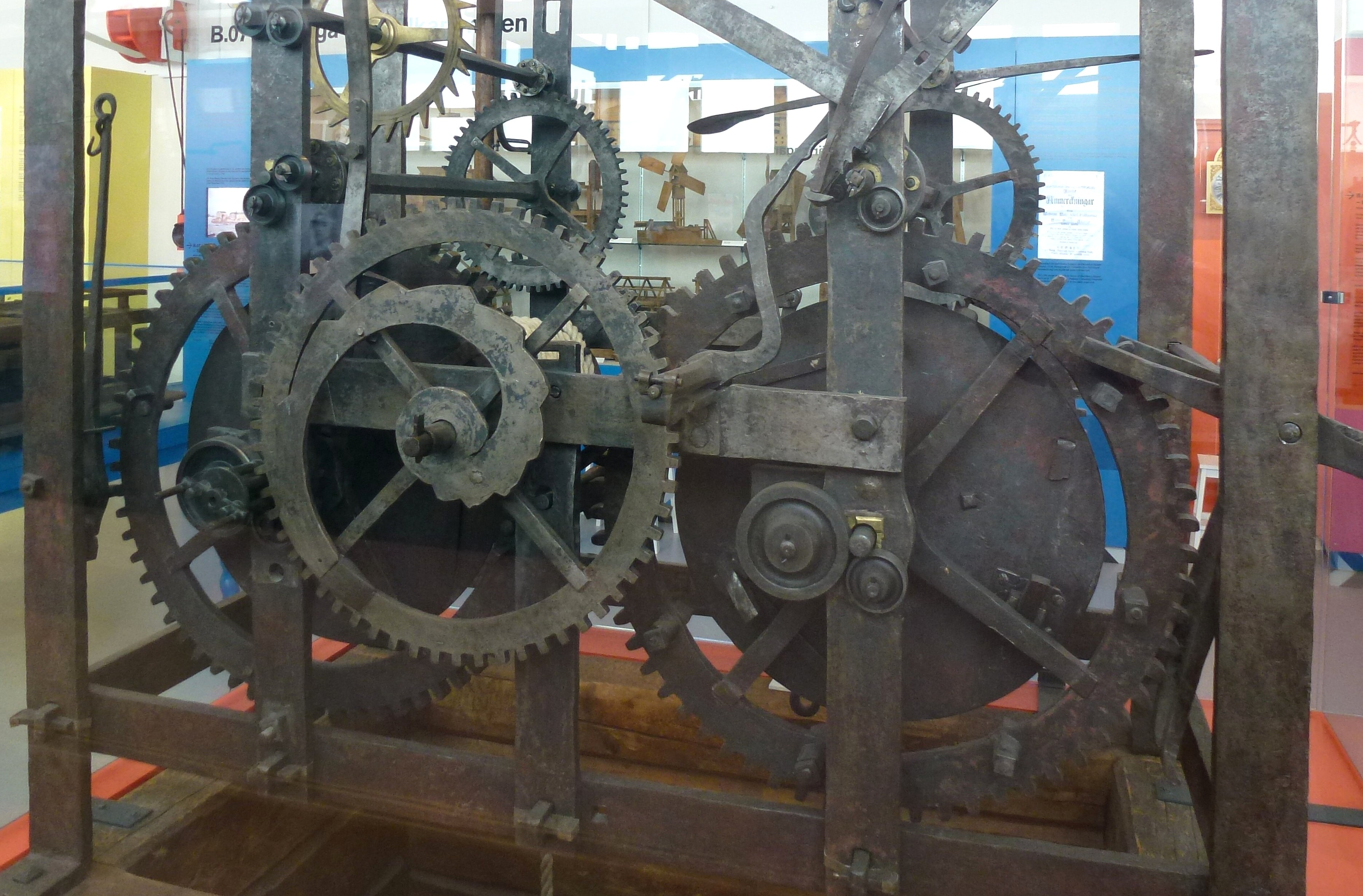
Tower clock of Maria Magdalena Church, made by Stjärnsund. Nowadays exhibited at the Swedish National Museum of Science and Technology.

Stjärnsunds manufakturverk was a Swedish mechanical manufacturing company, most known for its production of clocks. It was founded in 1700, in the town Stjärnsund near Hedemora, by inventor and industrialist Christopher Polhem (né Polhammar) and financed by civil servant Gabriel Stierncrona.

Today, there is a company named Stiernsunds-ur which produces clocks according to Polhem's design, and performs repairs and maintenance on the originals.
