= Judarskogen nature reserve =

Nature reserve in Stockholm, Sweden

Coordinates: 59°20′16″N 17°54′47″E

- Judarskogens naturreservat
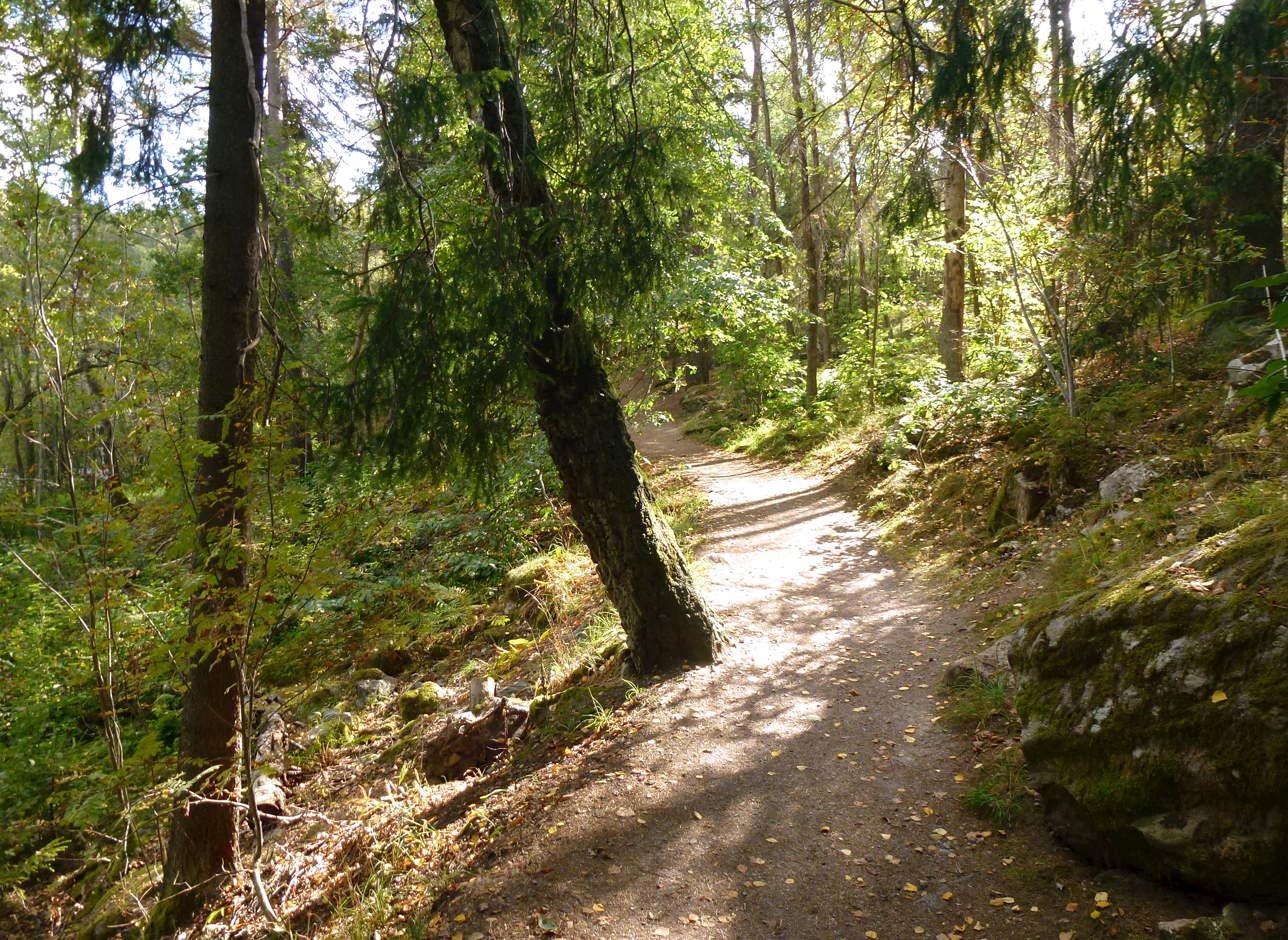
- Interactive map of Judarskogen nature reserve
- Location: Sweden
- Nearest city: Stockholm
- Area: 94.87 hectares (6.49 hectares water)
- Established: November 29, 1995

Judarskogen nature reserve is a municipal nature reserve and a Natura 2000 area in Bromma, western Stockholm, Sweden. It is located in Bromma parish in Stockholm municipality in Uppland. The area of Judarskogen was set in the early 20th century as a nature park. Judarskogen became an outdoor reserve in 1932 and since 1995 it has been a nature reserve. The reserve is named after the lake Judarn, which is located in the middle of the area.

== Description ==
Judarskogen is surrounded by Norra Ängby area on the north side, Södra Ängby area on the west side, Åkeshov castle in the northeast and Nockebyhov in the southeast. In the west, the Judarskogen borders the Ängbybadet at Lake Mälaren. In the middle of Judarskogen is the lake Judarn. The name Judarn comes from the word luda, to sound. The lake is surrounded by woodland and open grassland. In the reserve, there are plenty of paths and parkways − among other things, there is a nature trail with information signs.

=== Purpose ===
The purpose of the reserve is to protect the De Geer moraines, develop and preserve biodiversity and ensure that the area can be used for outdoor activities, to care for woodland, grassland and watercourses so that the biological values are preserved and developed.

=== Arrangement ===
Judarskogen is criss-crossed by a number of paths that were prepared in the 1930s as an AK work (State Unemployment Commission), when the area became a free-air reserve in 1932. Paths and dirt roads were prepared that go through dense forest and reach the lake, and paths that go out on the meadows and up between boulders and outcrops and down into valleys rich in vegetation. In the northwestern part of the reserve, near Ängbyplan, there are the open meadows. The area has a large number of these forest paths and dirt roads.

=== Judarskogen nature trail ===
Around the lake Judarn leads an approximately two kilometer long nature trail that is bordered by eight informative signs with a focus on how the Last Glacial Period shaped the landscape around the lake. The nature trail was prepared in 1996 by the then Stockholm Street and Property Office. A suitable starting point is the car park at Ängbybadet or at Åkeshov castle. At the lake there are several prepared rest and barbecue areas. The difficulty level of the path is stated as "easy", but not suitable for people in wheelchairs. The marker color is blue.

=== Vegetation and Natura 2000 ===
During inventories in the years 1940-1990, more than 400 species of plants were registered. The forest vegetation is dominated by spruce forest and pine forest and heathland pine forest with elements of deciduous trees, but there is also mixed forest and moist deciduous forest, which grows around the lake and a couple of smaller deciduous stands. The forest area is broken up by some larger and smaller grasslands. The coniferous forest and the heathland forest have elements of rowan, birch and oak leaves. The pine forest grows on moraine and has a strong admixture of deciduous trees. The deciduous forest around Lake Judarn consists of alder and birch. At grasslands east of Åkeshov avenue there is a stand of broadleaf forest on an old hemlock hill. The mixed forest consists of pine, spruce and oak.

North of Judarn, a pond for water salamanders and other amphibians has been prepared. According to the conservation plan for the Natura 2000 area, a favorable environment must be created for the greater newt. Although the algal swamp forest in the area is considered to have too little continuity in the current situation to be worthy of protection, the plan is to develop the area so that in the future it meets the criteria for a nature type worthy of protection according to Natura 2000.

=== Torpet Lugnet ===
On the edge of the nature reserve to the west of the lake near Ängbybadet is the farm Lugnet, which is owned by the city of Stockholm and managed by the Lilla Gillet laivförening. Torpet Lugnet has a half-timbered cottage with a tiled stove from the 1760s and some houses that were moved here. Lugnet consists of four buildings, main building, cottage, outbuilding and outhouse. Already in the 1930s, the Bromma Girl Scout Corps was based here. Outside the outhouse there is also a rest area with a fireplace. In the 1950s and 1960s, "Lilla och stora Lugnet" was used by the Nockeby Scout Corps. Torpet Lugnet is located in the western part of the area and there are also two larger buildings here that are owned and managed by Stockholm Municipality Street and Property Office. In the eastern part of the area, there are two buildings: Kvarnstugan and Smedstugan, which are also owned and managed by Stockholm Municipality Street and Property Office, and are rented out to associations.

From the 1930s, Kungsholm Baptist Church had a scout cabin in Judarskogen. It was located on the hill southwest of Lake Judarn, but burned down in the late 1960s.

== The Russian Wall ==
The so-called Ryssmuren (Russian Wall) is a stone wall located in the nature reserve to the east of Judarn. The facility consists of a natural stone wall approximately 1,100 meters long and approximately two meters high that branches out in the north. The wall extends through Judarskogen. In the wall there are individual moving blocks up to two meters in size . The wall's primary function is to act as a permanent fence. The wall has nine openings, 1–4 meters wide. The wall was probably built during the 18th century, when Charles XII reigned. It was built before 1818 and there is only one legend that states that Russian prisoners of war built it. The Great Nordic War took place in the early 1700s and hence it is speculated, as well as a tradition, that Russian prisoners of war from the war were the ones who built the wall in 1719 (which is not proven) when the Stenbock family owned the castle. The Russian Wall is an ancient monument with RAÄ number Bromma 19:1.

There are two main theories as to why the wall exists:

- It was built to enclose livestock on Åkeshov castle estate.
- It is a cultivation mound from the 19th century. This was shown by later research.
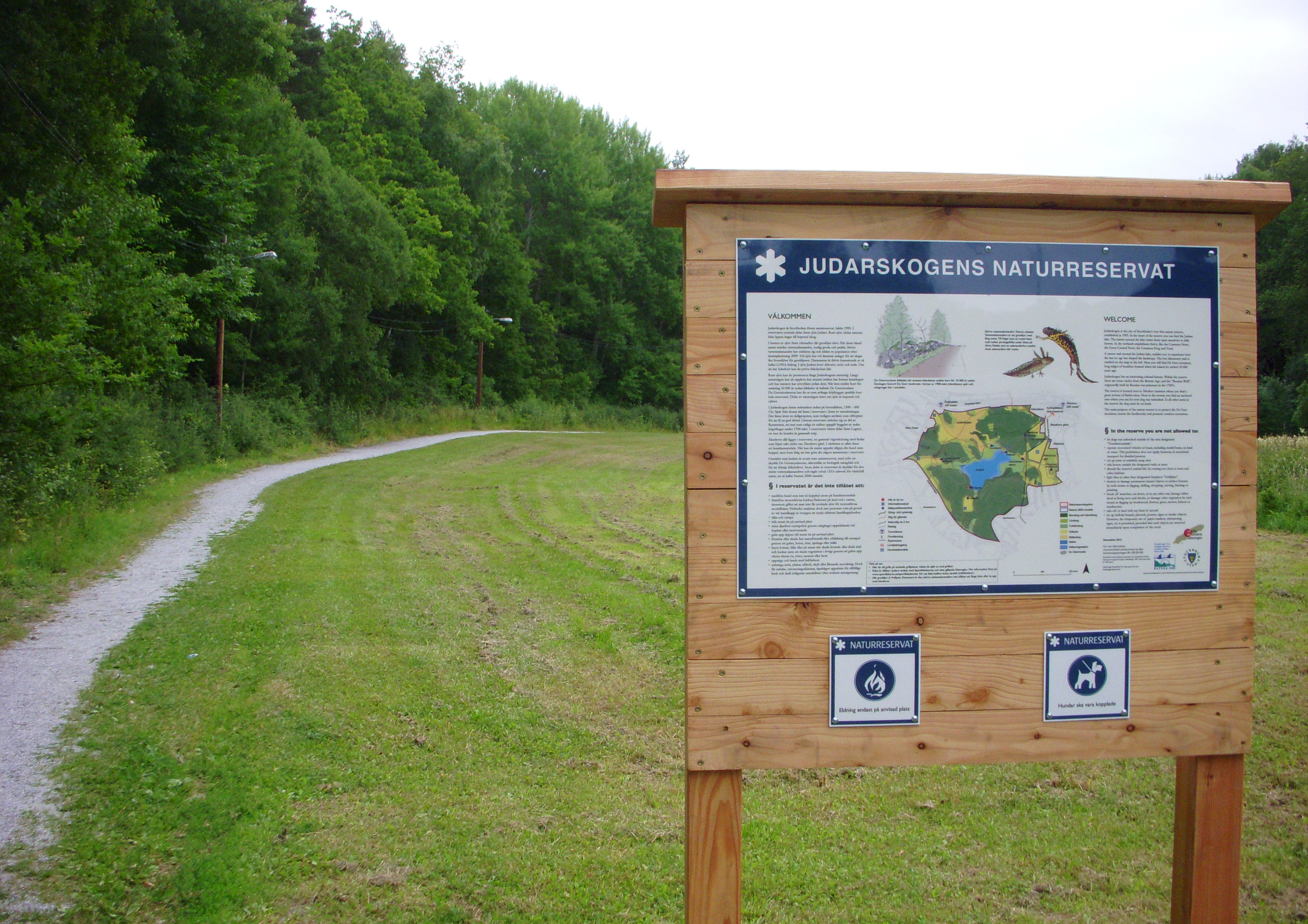
Reserve sign at Ängbybadet

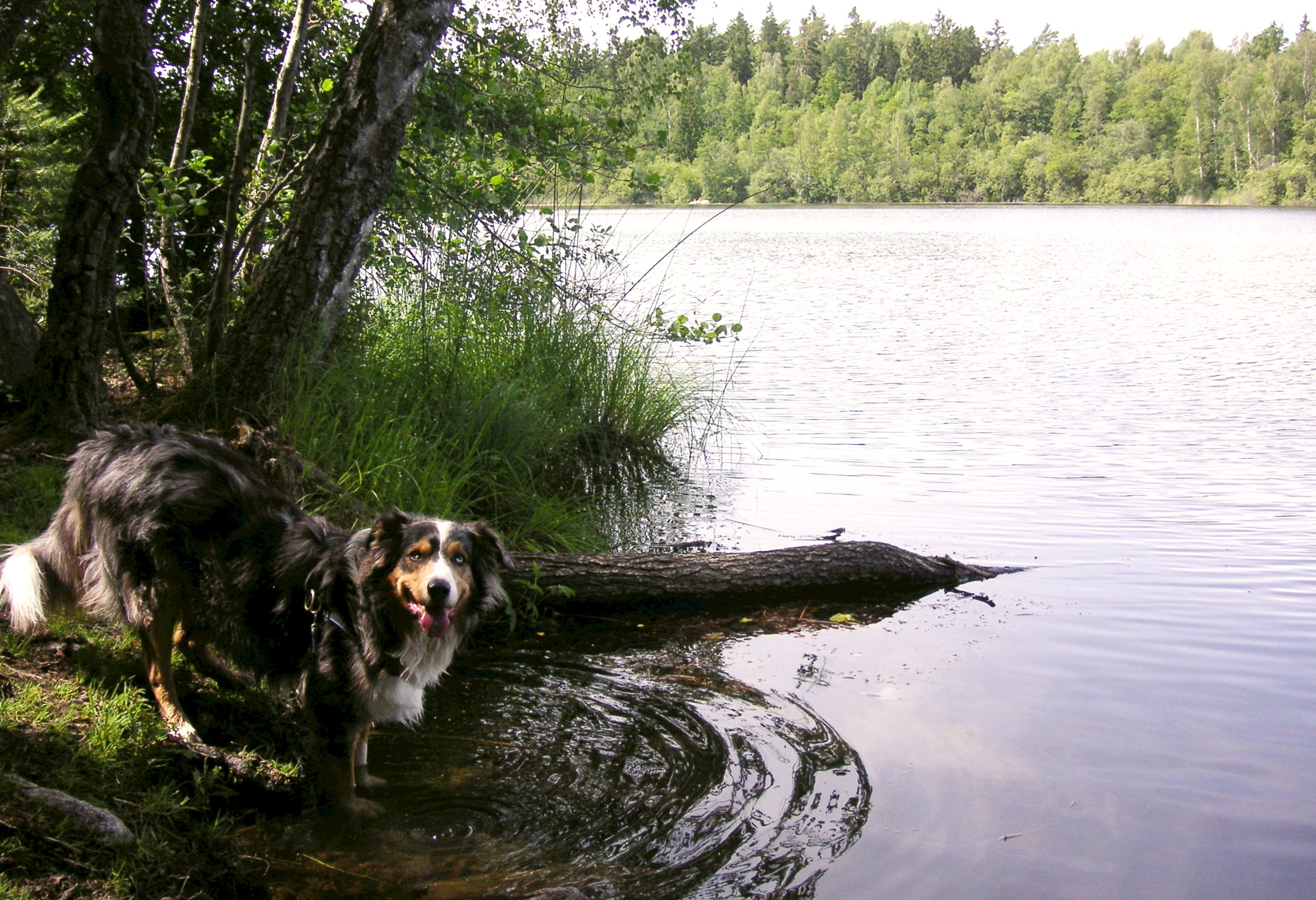
Lake Judarn

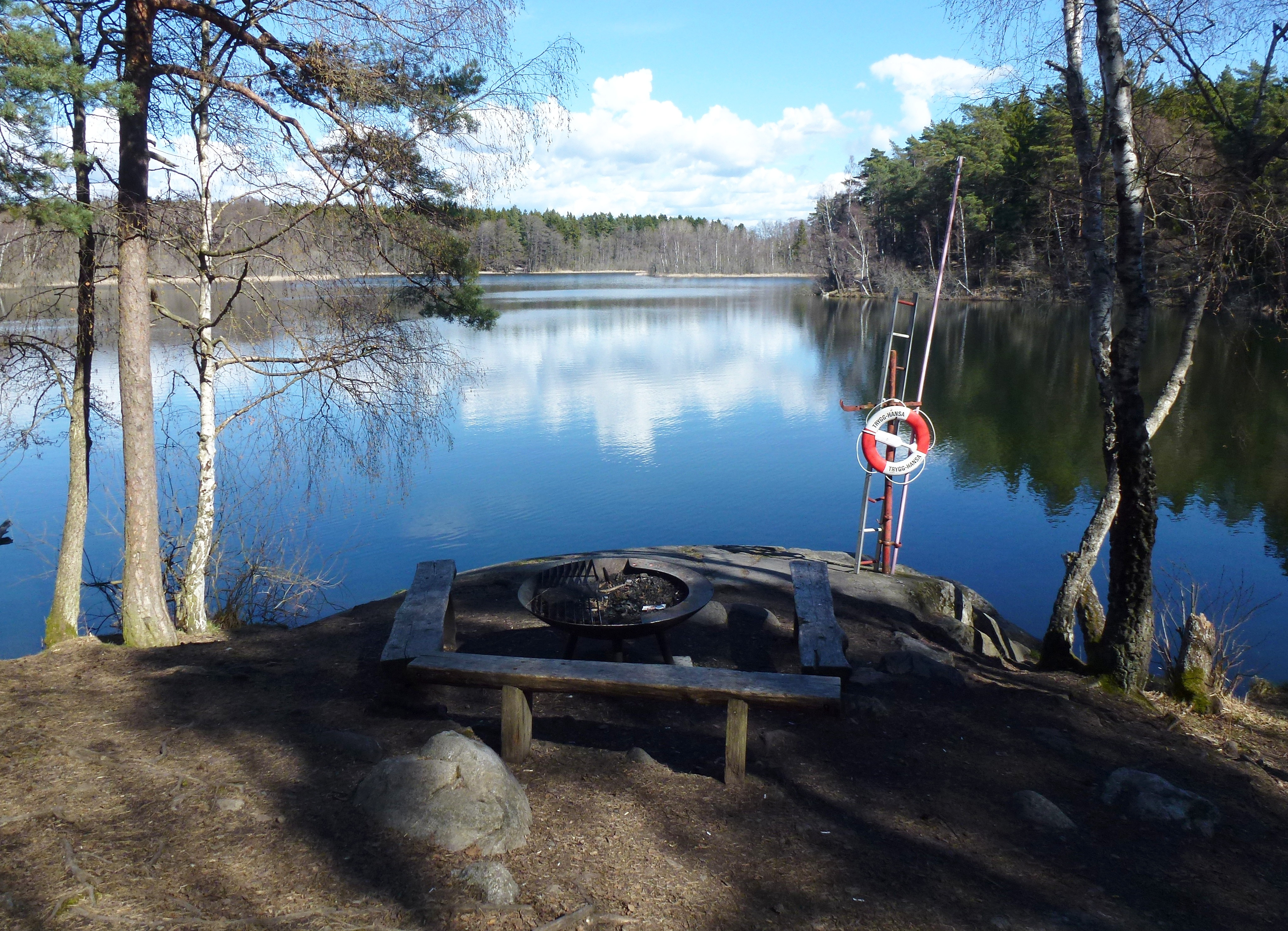
Area near Judarn

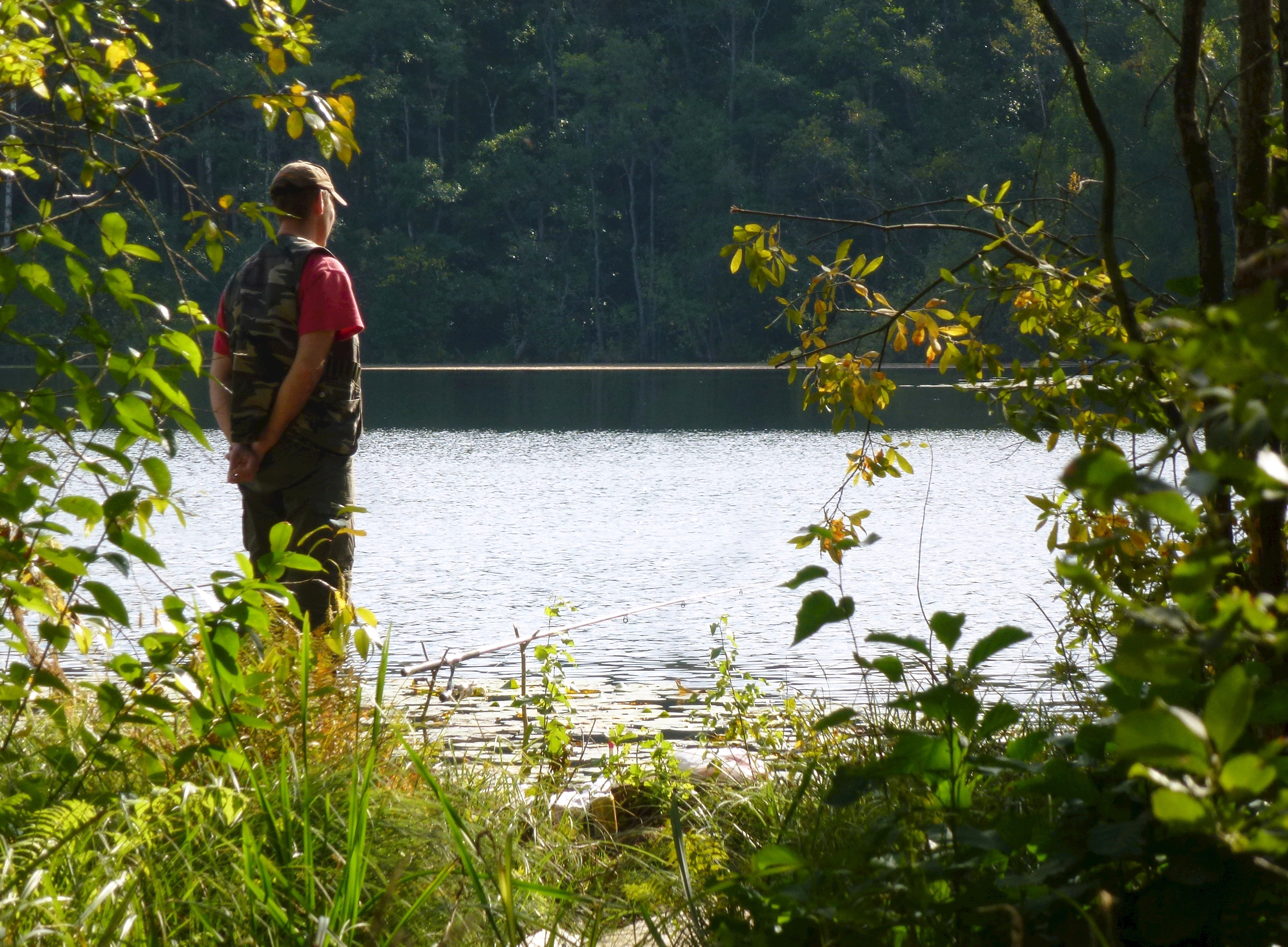
Lake Judarn
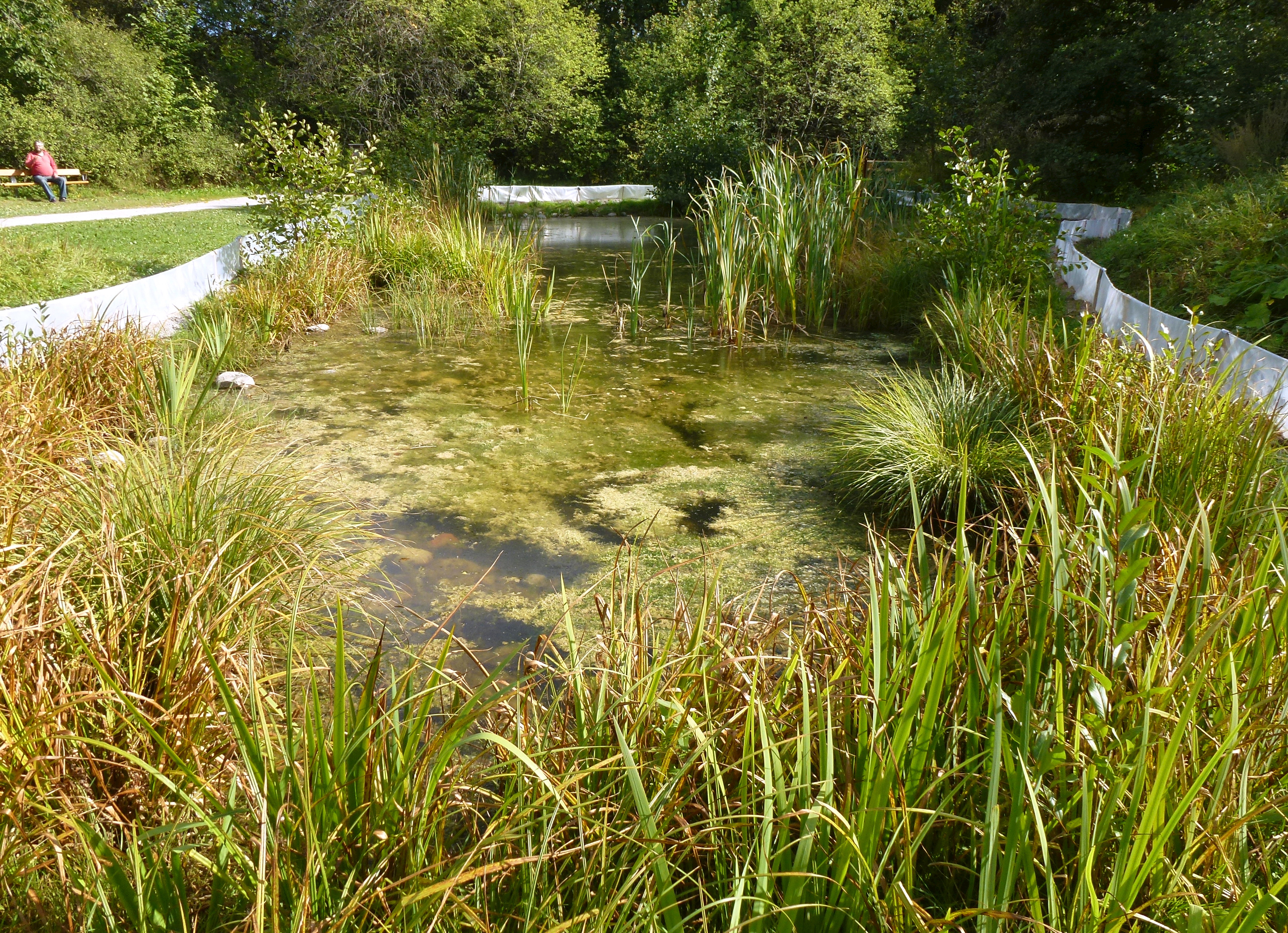
Salamander dam

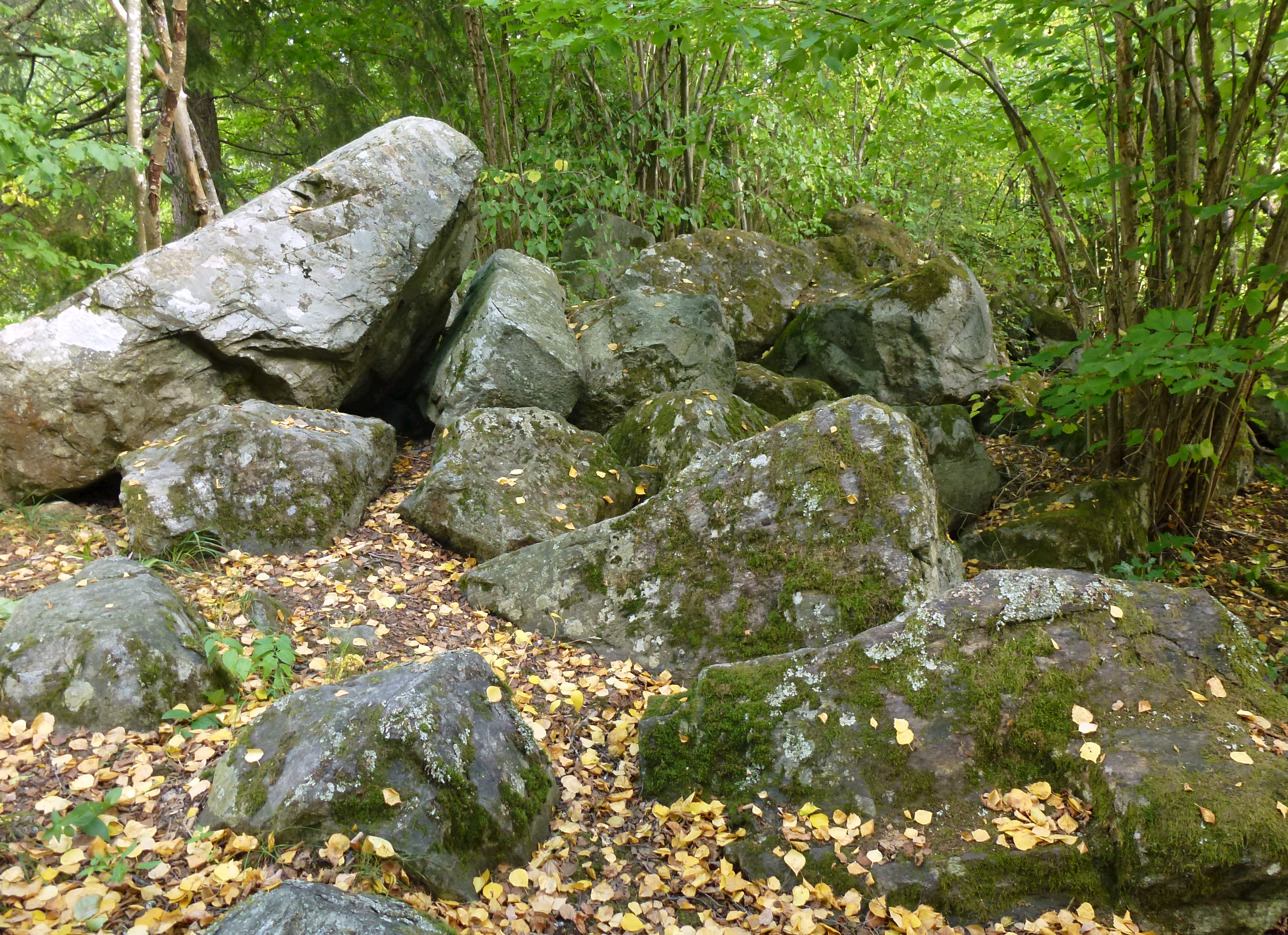

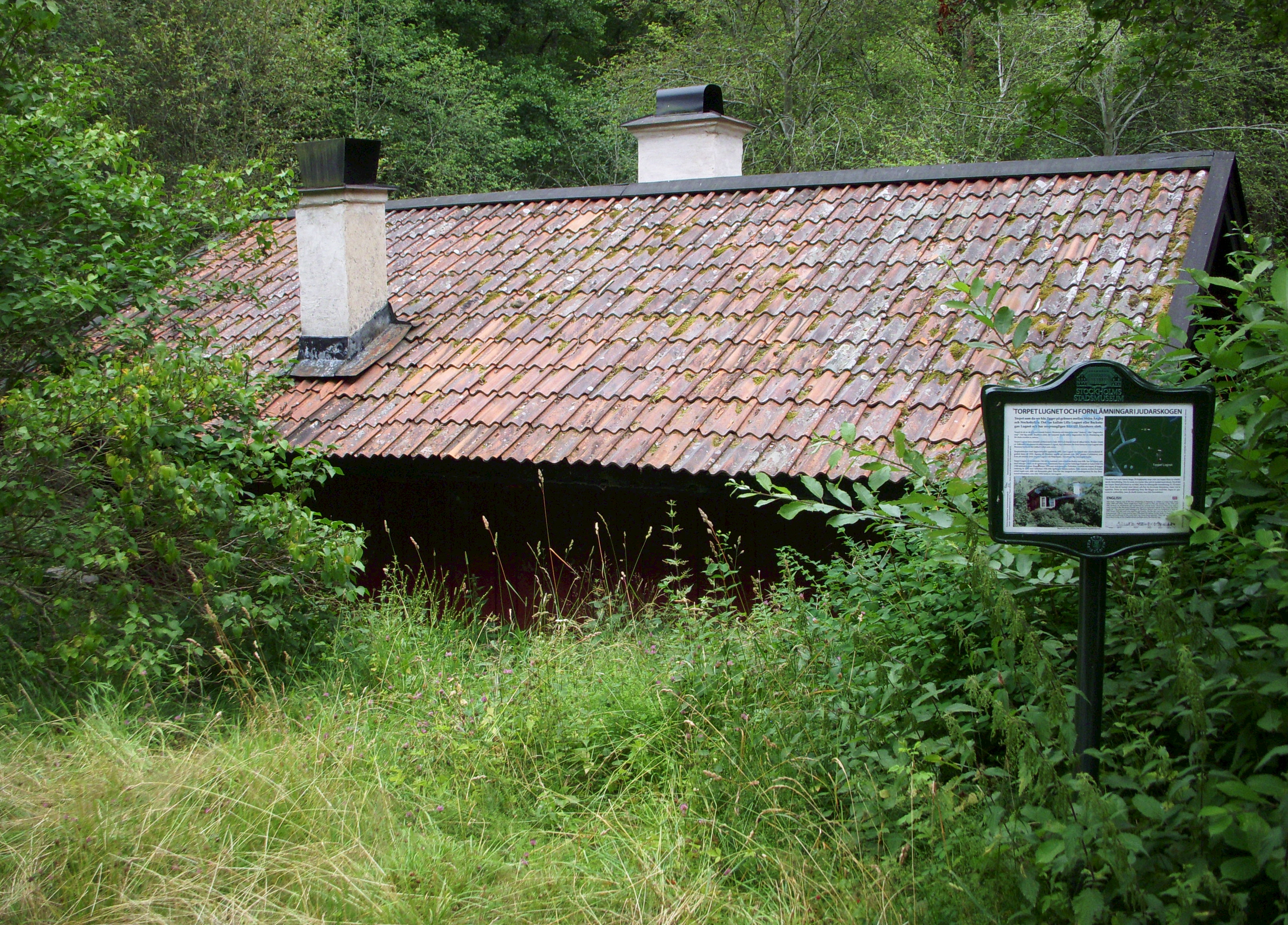
Torpet Lugnet

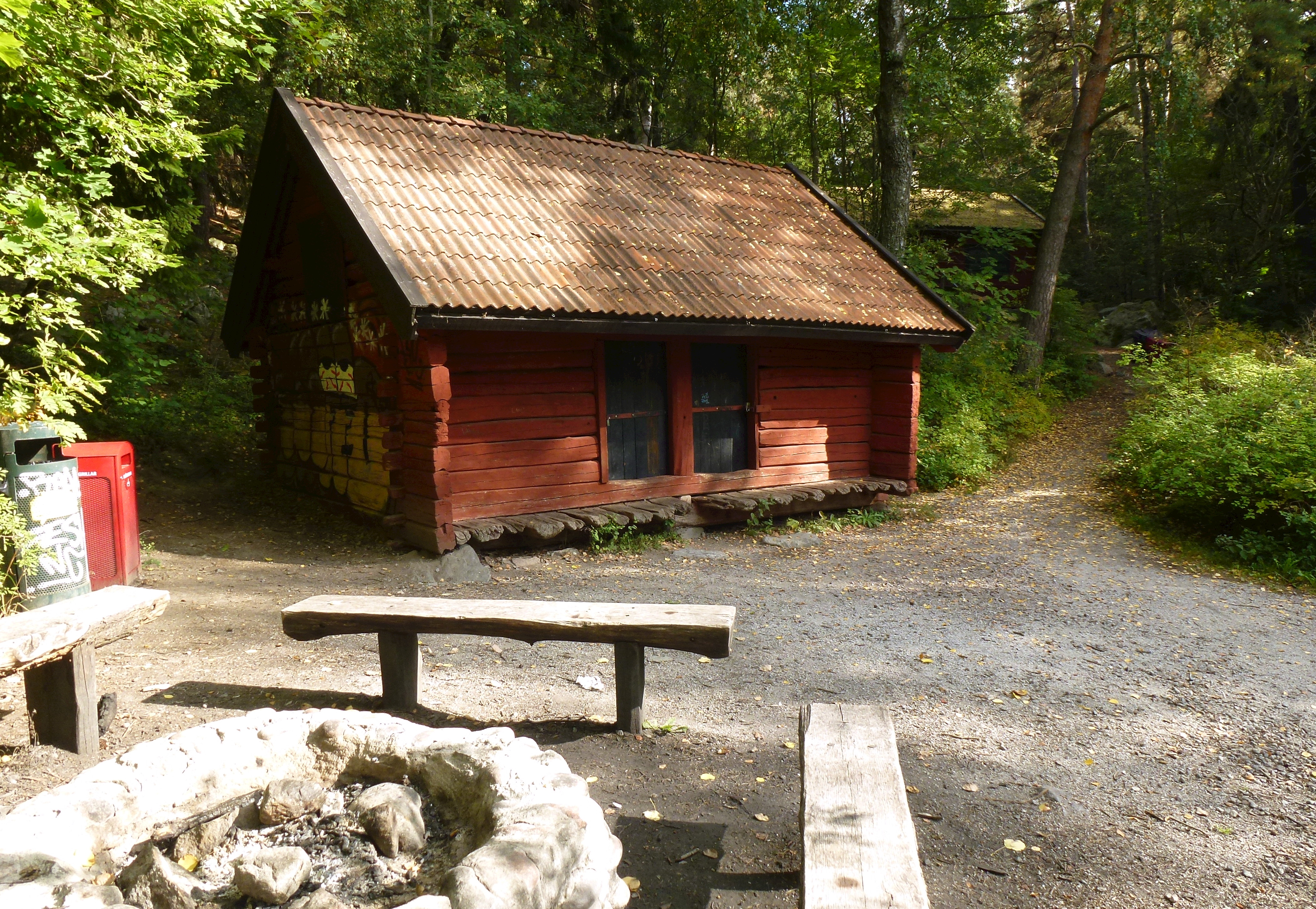
