= Christopher Polhem =

Swedish inventor and industrialist (1661–1751)

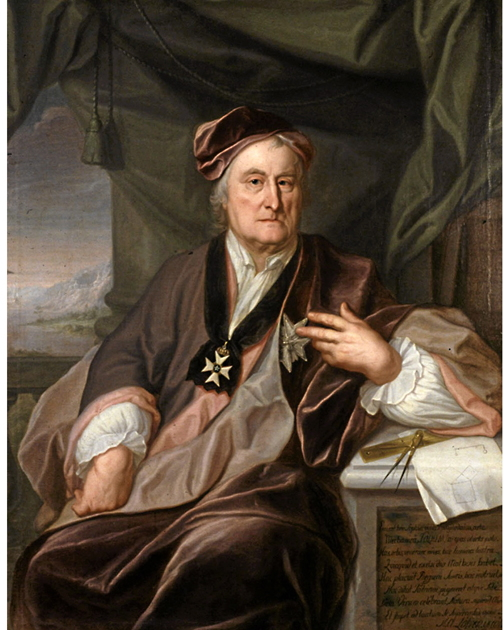
- Portrait of Christopher Polhem (1741)
- Born: 18 December 1661; Tingstäde, Gotland, Sweden
- Died: 30 August 1751 (aged 89); Stockholm, Sweden
- Education: Uppsala University; University of Harderwijk
- Known for: Göta Canal; Various inventions
- Awards: Order of the Polar Star, Head of the Royal Swedish Academy of Sciences. Ennobled in 1716
- Scientific career
- Fields: Physics, mechanics

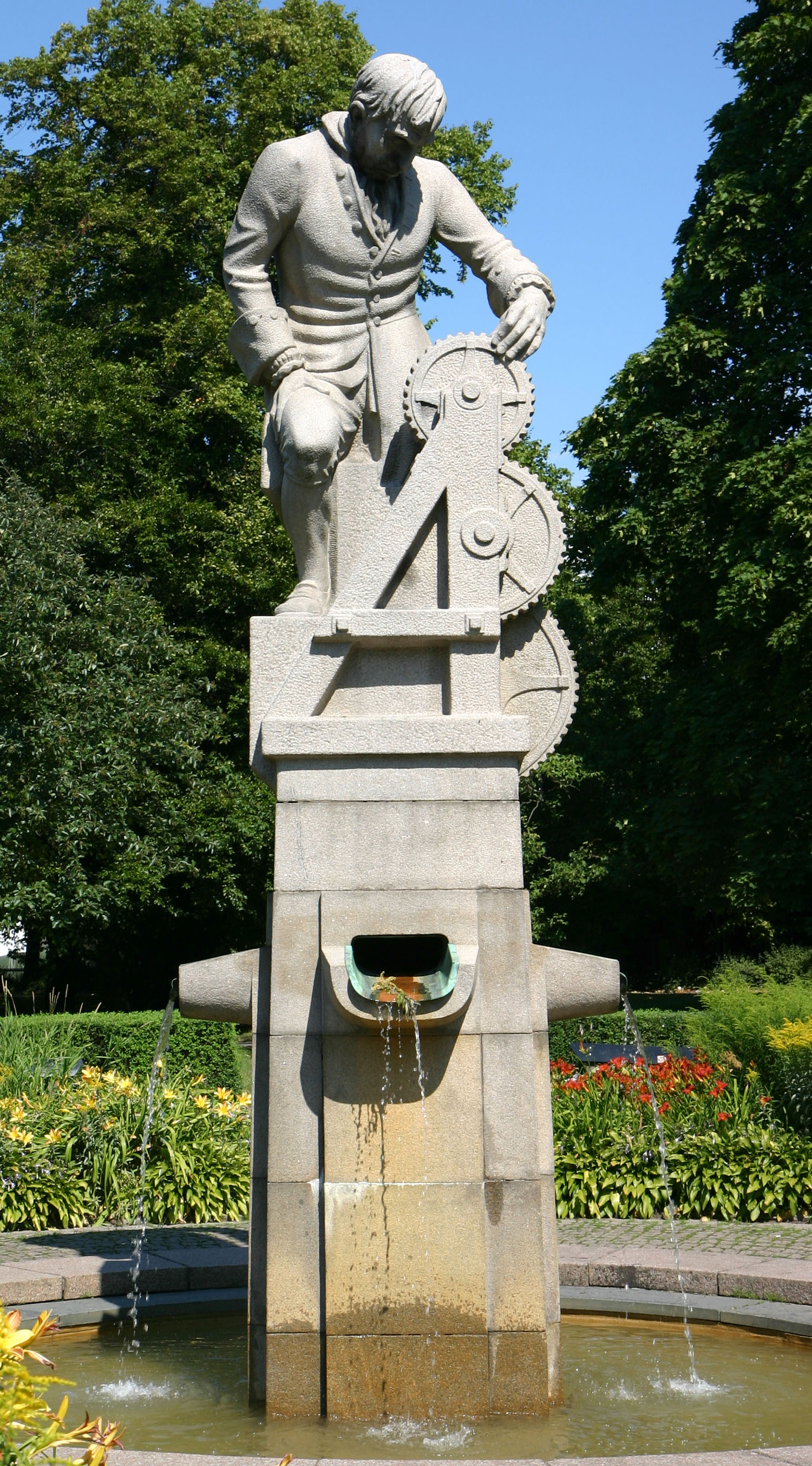
Statue of Christopher Polhem by Ivar Johnsson in Gothenburg (granite.1952)

Christopher Polhammar (18 December 1661 – 30 August 1751) better known as Christopher Polhem, which he took after his ennoblement in 1716, was a Swedish scientist, inventor, and industrialist. He made significant contributions to the economic and industrial development of Sweden, particularly mining. He was ennobled by King Charles XII of Sweden for his contributions to Swedish technological development.

== Biography ==
Polhem (Polhammar) was born on the island of Gotland in the village of Tingstäde, north-east of Visby. Originally, the Polhem family came from the Kingdom of Hungary, where they were established latest in the 14th century of possible Austrian descent.

Polhem's father, Wolf Christoph Polhammer, born c. 1610 in Hungary to a baron, moved from Hungary to Swedish Pomerania because the Austrian Catholics had the then predominantly Protestant Hungarians under religious persecution. Wolf Polhammer traded with Visby. He would eventually settle down to become a skipper.

Christopher Polhammar attended a German-language school in Stockholm until the age of 8 when his father died. His mother, Christina Eriksdotter Schening, who was from Vadstena in Östergötland, later remarried. Because of conflicts with his stepfather, his private tuition was no longer paid and Polhem was sent to live with his uncle in Stockholm.

He took a job as a farmhand on Vansta, a property in Södertörn, Stockholm. Quickly, he rose to the position of supervisor, being responsible for supervision and accounting, for which he was well suited by his affinity for mathematics. He worked at Vansta for ten years, during which period he constructed a workshop where he made tools, repaired and constructed simple machinery to earn money.

Hungering for knowledge within his fields of interest, mathematics and mechanics, he soon realized that he would get no further without learning Latin. Self-studies were attempted, but given up; Polhem realized he needed a tutor. In exchange for constructing a complex clock, he was given Latin lessons by a local vicar.

Word of Polhem's mechanical skill spread quickly and a member of the clergy wrote to Anders Spole, professor of mathematics at Uppsala University to recommend Polhem. Anders Spole, grandfather of Anders Celsius, presented two broken clocks to Polhem and offered to let him study under him if he could repair them. Polhem repaired the clocks with no difficulty and in 1687, entered the University of Uppsala at the age of 26.

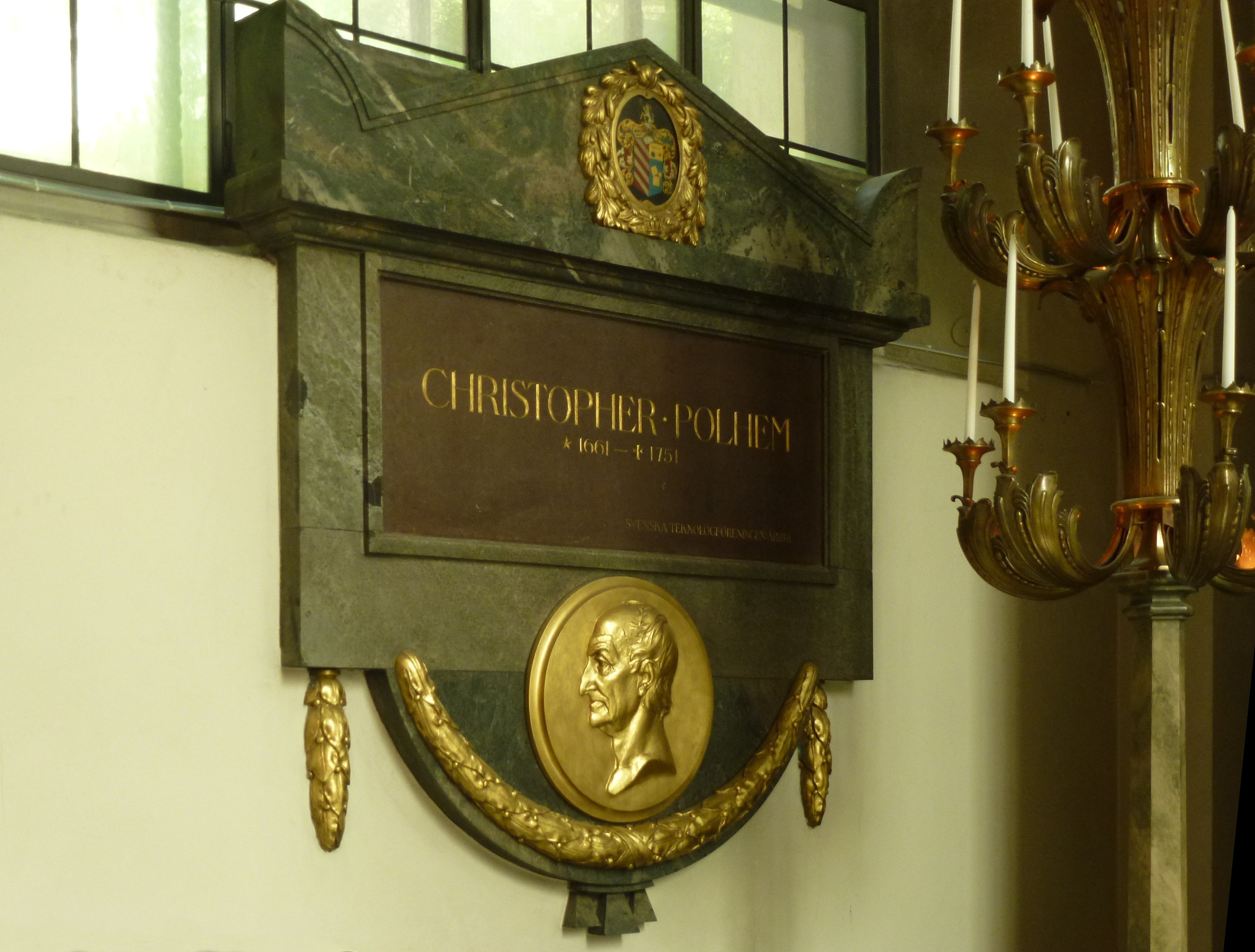
Memorial to Christopher Polhem at Maria Magdalena Church in Stockholm

== Personal life ==
Polhem married Maria Hoffman on 28 December 1691. Together they had eight children between 1692 and 1705.

In 1716, he was ennobled by King Charles XII of Sweden in gratitude of his services to the nation by the king and changed his surname from Polhammar to Polheim, which he later shortened to Polhem.

He and his son Gabriel Polhem (1700–1772) were both elected members of the Royal Swedish Academy of Sciences in 1739, the same year the academy was founded.

Polhem died of natural causes in 1751 in Stockholm, at the age of 90.

== Career ==
=== Industrial ===
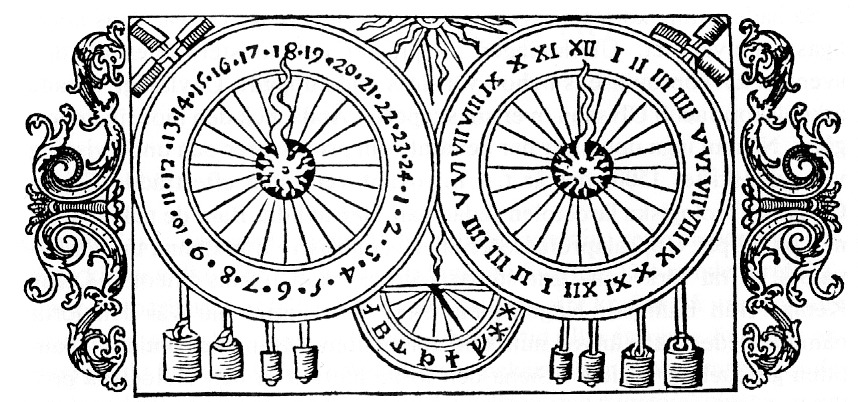
16th century woodcut from the History of Olaus Magnus, purportedly depicting the astronomical clock in Uppsala Cathedral.

According to Polhem's autobiography, the event that marked the beginning of his career was the successful repair of the unfinished medieval (16th century) astronomical clock designed by Petrus Astronomus at Uppsala Cathedral, which had remained unfinished and broken for more than a century.

In 1690 Polhem was appointed to improve upon the current mining operations of Sweden. His contribution was a construction for lifting and transporting ore from mines, a process that was rather risky and inefficient at the time. The construction consisted of a track system for lifting the ore, as opposed to wires; the construction was powered entirely by a water wheel. Human labor needed was limited to loading the containers. Being new and revolutionary, word of Polhem's work reached King Charles XI of Sweden who was so impressed with the work that he assigned him to improve Sweden's main mining operation; the Falun Mine in Dalarna.

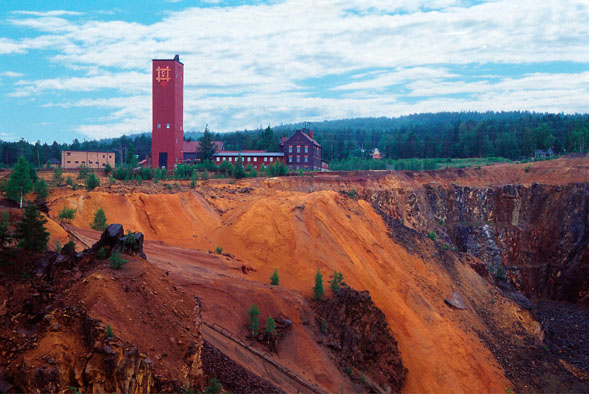
Falun copper mine as it looks today.

Funded by the Swedish mining authority, Polhem traveled throughout Europe, studying mechanical development. He returned to Sweden in 1697 to establish laboratorium mechanicum in Stockholm, a facility for the training of engineers, as well as a laboratory for testing and exhibiting his designs. It has since become the prestigious KTH Royal Institute of Technology, whose history began with Charles XI and his praise for Polhem for his mining efforts.

His greatest achievement was an automated factory powered entirely by water, Stjärnsund manufactory. The manufactory was financed by Gabriel Stierncrona. Built in 1699 in Stjärnsund, the factory produced a number of products including manufacture of knives, locks and clocks. Development of the factory was derived from the idea that Sweden should export fewer raw materials and instead process them within their own borders. The factory met great resistance among workers who feared they would be replaced by machinery. Eventually most of the factory was destroyed in a fire in 1734, leaving only the part of the factory that produced clocks. The factory continued producing clocks, known for their high quality and low price. Although the popularity of the clocks diminished during the beginning of the 19th century, clock-making continues to this day at Stjärnsund, still producing around twenty clocks of the Polhem design per year.

Another product from the factory was the "Polhem locks" (Swedish: Polhemslås), essentially the first design of the variation of padlocks common today. Clocks and padlocks were both produced with interchangeable parts and the locking parts of the padlocks were coded so that customers could order reserve keys.

Economically, the factory was unfeasible, but the king at the time, Charles XII, was supportive and gave Polhem freedom from taxes to encourage his efforts. The factory of Stjärnsund was visited by one of his contemporaries, Carl Linnaeus, who wrote about the factory in his diaries as "Nothing is more optimistic than Stjärnsund" (Swedish: Intet är spekulativare än Stjärnsund).

Polhem also contributed to the construction of Göta Canal, a canal connecting the east and west coasts of Sweden. Together with Charles XII of Sweden, he planned the construction of parts of the canal, particularly the canal locks in the 18th century; it was not to be finished until 1832, long after his death.

Other major contributions made by Polhem were the constructions of dry docks, dams, and canal locks, which he designed together with his assistant and friend, Emanuel Swedenborg.

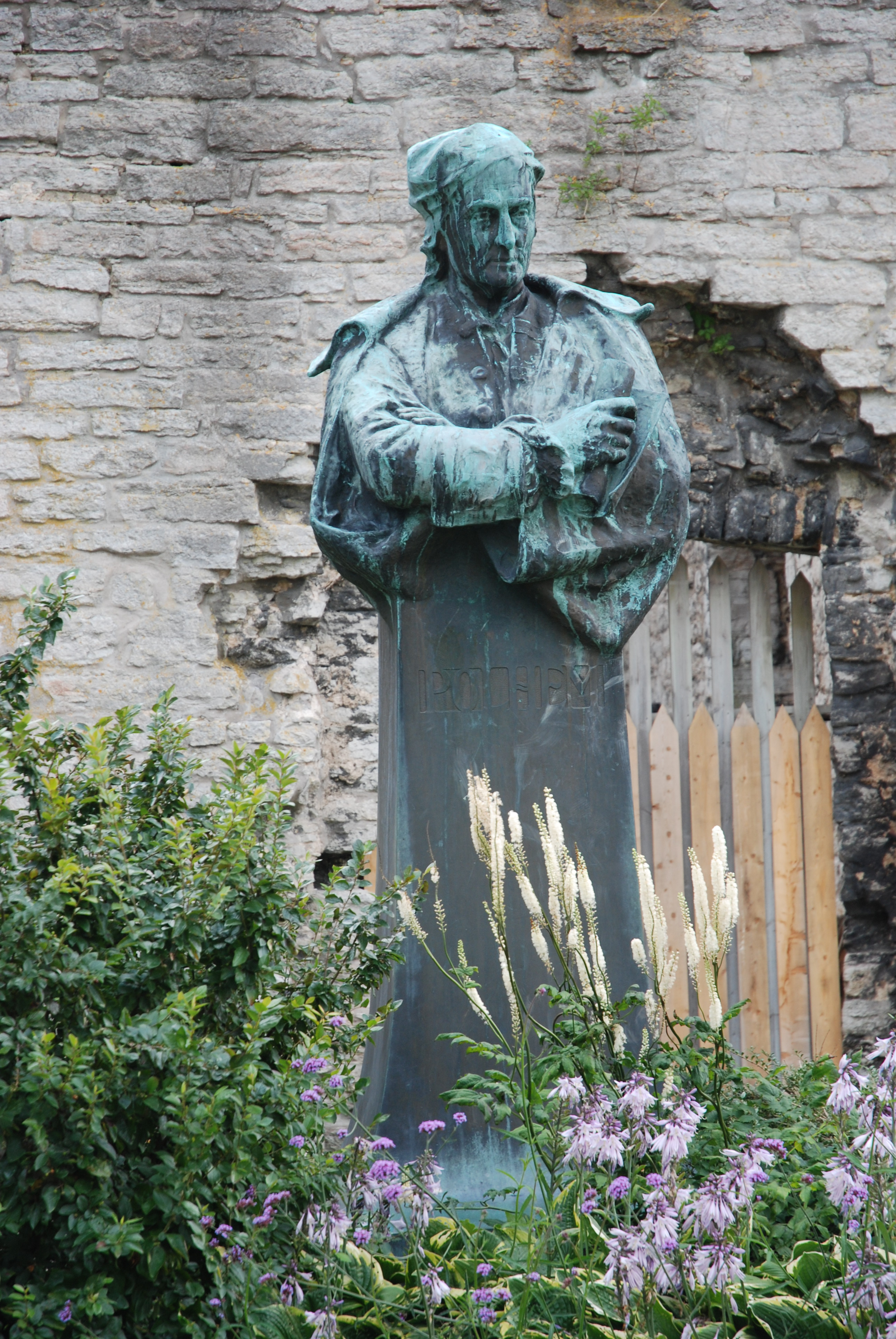
Christopher Polhem statue by Theodor Lundberg outside Drotten Church Ruin in Visby (bronze.1911)

=== Other fields ===
Polhem was not only active within the field of mechanics, he actively wrote essays concerning medicine, social criticism, astronomy, geology, and economics.

== Notable accomplishments ==
- Founded Stjärnsunds manufakturverk in södra Dalarna during 1700.
- Reinvented the Cardan joint under the name of "Polhem knot" (Swedish: Polhemknut) independently of Gerolamo Cardano, the pioneer inventor.
- Organized machinery into a "mechanical alphabet" and provided examples of such. Of 80 models carved in wood, 32 are still in the collections of the National Museum of Science and Technology (Swedish:Tekniska Museet) in Stockholm. Another 13 models of the "mechanical alphabet" are to be found in the Falun Mining Museum, Sweden.

== Legacy ==
- His image appeared reverse of the 500 Swedish kronor bank note which was issued between 2001 and 2016. The front featured a portrait of King Charles XI of Sweden.
- Polhem Prize (Polhemspriset) was named in his honor. The award is awarded by the Swedish Association of Graduate Engineers to significant contributors to industry and construction engineering.
- Christopher Polhem statue in bronze by Theodor Lundberg is featured outside the Drotten Church Ruin in Visby.
- Christopher Polhem Monument in granite by Ivar Johnsson is located in Gothenburg.

== See also ==
- Emanuel Swedenborg
