= Söderby, Sweden =

Söderby, Ekerö kommun
- Smaller locality
- Location within Stockholm Location within Sweden
- Coordinates: 59°22′57″N 17°34′45″E
- Country: Sweden
- Province: Uppland
- County: Stockholm County
- Municipality: Ekerö Municipality

Area
  - Total: 0.23 sq mi (0.59 km^{2})

Population (31 December 2020)
  - Total: 279
  - Density: 1,200/sq mi (470/km^{2})
- Time zone: UTC+1 (CET)
  - Summer (DST): UTC+2 (CEST)

Söderby is a village (smaller locality) situated in Ekerö Municipality, Stockholm County, southeastern Sweden with 250 inhabitants in 2010.
